= Kyle Bay =

- Suburb
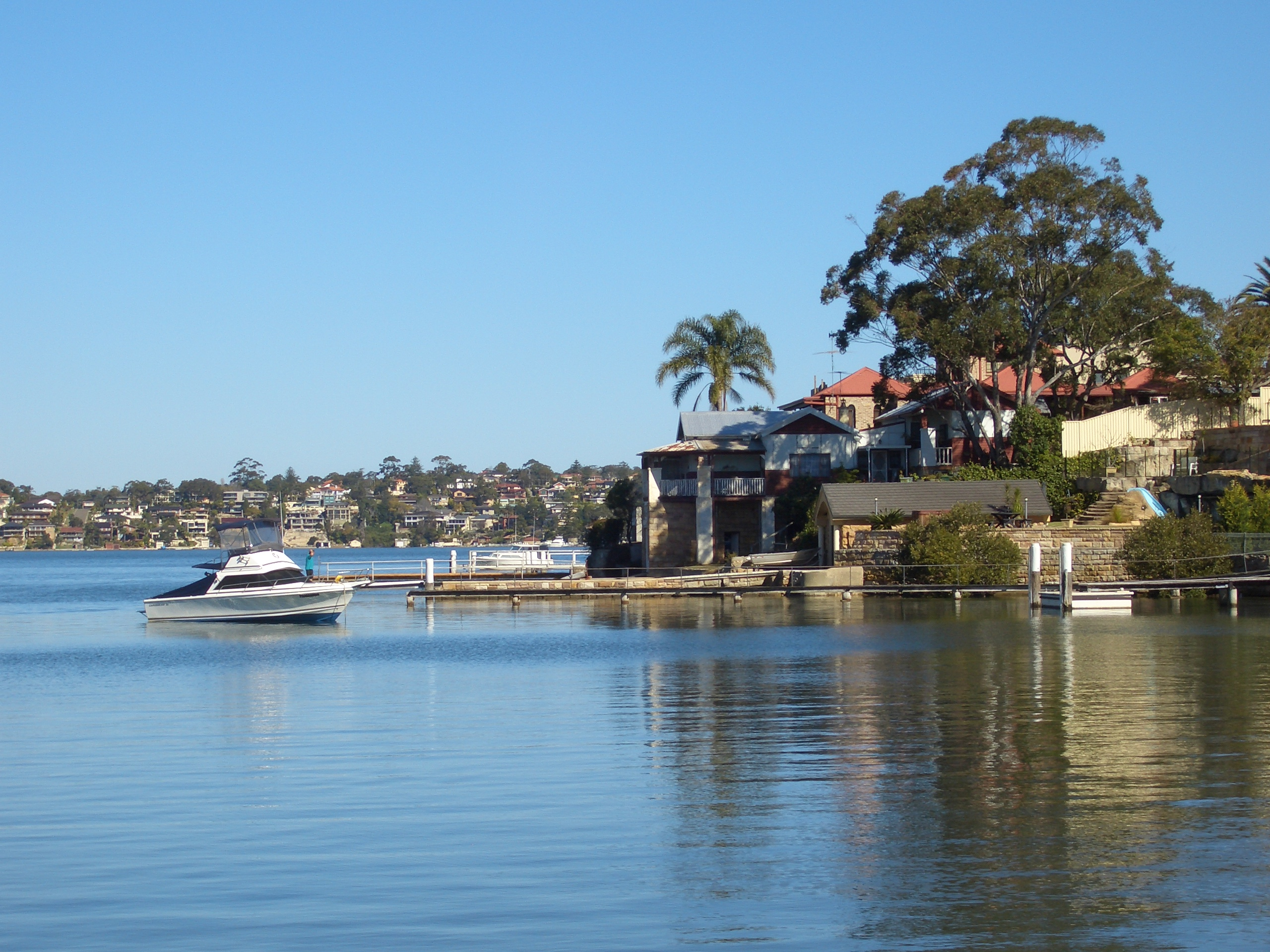
- Kyle Bay, view from Merriman Reserve

- Interactive map of Kyle Bay
- Coordinates: 33°59′21″S 151°5′42″E
- Country: Australia
- State: New South Wales
- City: Sydney
- LGA: Georges River Council
- Location: 19 km (12 mi) south of Sydney CBD

Government
  - State electorate: Oatley
  - Federal division: Banks
- Elevation: 31 m (102 ft)

Population
  - Total: 1,039 (2021 census)
- Postcode: 2221
Suburbs around Kyle Bay
Connells Point	Connells Point	South Hurstville
Connells Point	Kyle Bay	Blakehurst
Oyster Bay	Kangaroo Point	Blakehurst

Kyle Bay is a suburb in southern Sydney, in the state of New South Wales, Australia. Kyle Bay is 19 kilometres south of the Sydney central business district, in the local government area of the Georges River Council and is part of the St George area.

Kyle Bay takes its name from the bay that sits on the northern shore of the Georges River. It is a tiny, affluent, picturesque suburb around this bay and Harness Cask Point. Kyle Bay is surrounded by the suburbs of Blakehurst, South Hurstville and Connells Point. Kangaroo Point sits on the opposite bank of the Georges River. It is 7 km west of Botany Bay and 12 km north-west of the Cronulla surfing beaches. This leafy suburb is graced with scenic riverside parks and reserves including Merriman Reserve and Donnelly Reserve. Kyle Bay and Harness Cask Point are natural formations.

== History ==
Kyle Bay was named after local shipbuilder Robert Kyle (or Coile). The land around Kyle Bay was originally granted by the Crown to Robert Kyle and James Merriman on 9 November 1853. Kyle Parade and Merriman Street are named in their honour. Legacy House is a historic estate on the eastern shore of Kyle Bay. It was bequest to children and first operated from 1948 to 1983 as a convalescent home for children. It was then taken over by Legacy as a home for the children of servicemen/women who have either lost their parents or whose parents were unable to care for them.

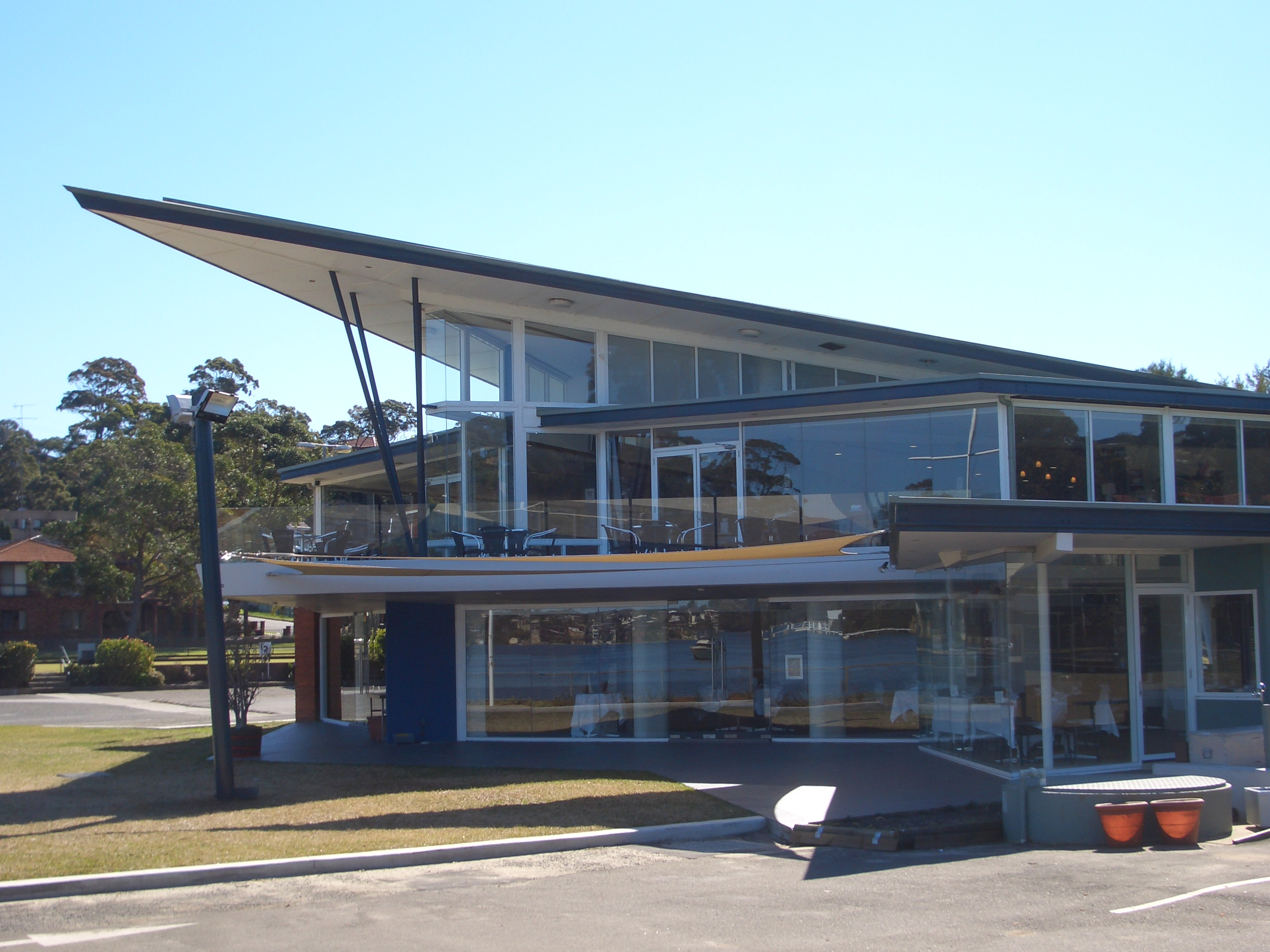
Bowling club

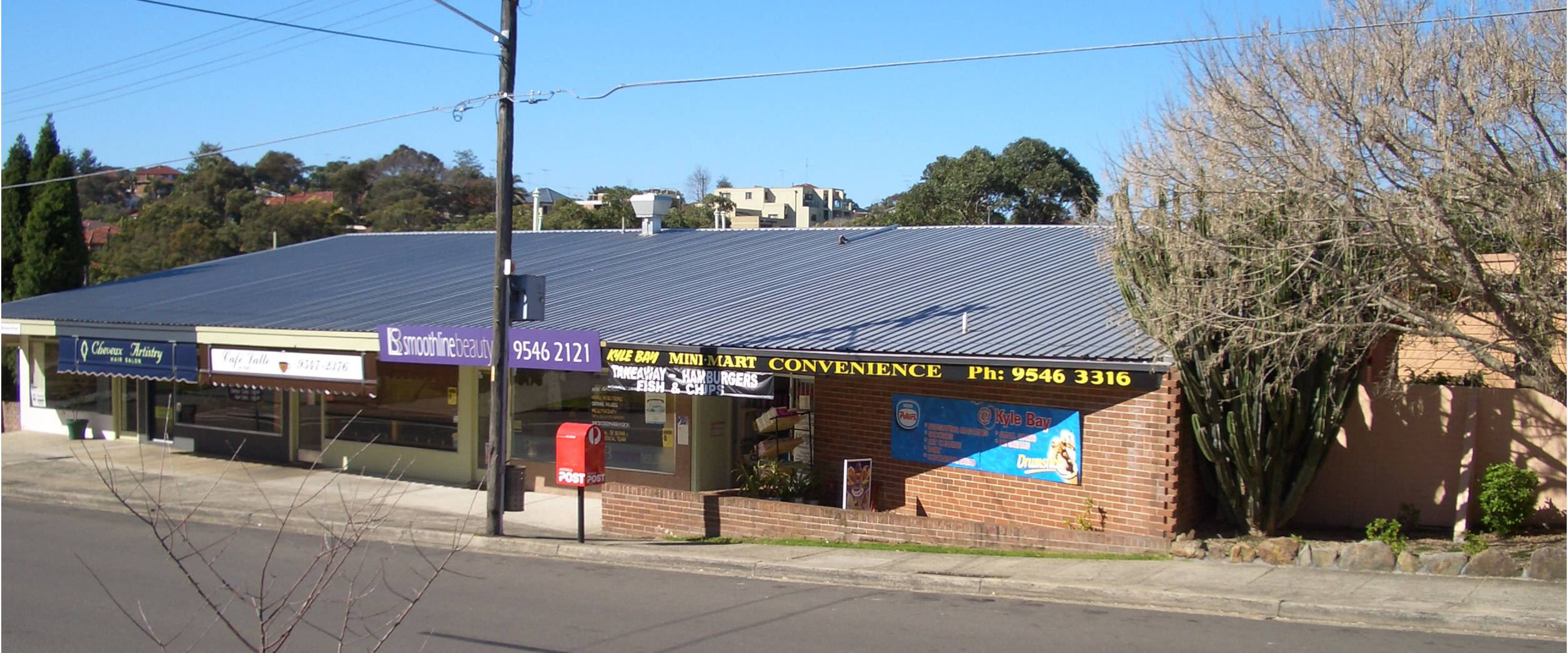
Shops in Kyle Parade

== Commercial area ==
A small group of shops is located on Kyle Parade, on the corner of Merriman Street.

== Population ==
According to the 2021 census, there were 1,039 people usually resident in Kyle Bay. 29.9% stated they were born overseas with the top countries of birth being China (excludes SARs and Taiwan) 8.3%, Greece 2.1%, and North Macedonia 1.4%. English was stated as the only language spoken at home by 58.5% of residents and the most common other languages spoken were Greek 9.3%, Cantonese 7.8%, and Mandarin 7.4%. The most common responses for religious affiliation were Catholic 24.8%, No Religion 23.2%, Orthodox 22.2% and Anglican 8.2%.
