= Kangaroo Point, New South Wales =

Kangaroo Point
- Suburb
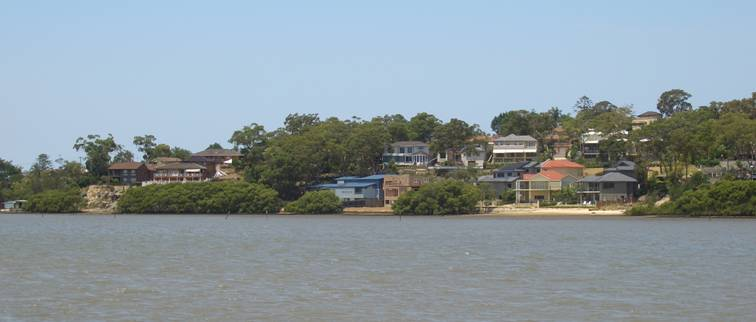
- Kangaroo Point, view from Oyster Bay

- Interactive map of Kangaroo Point
- Country: Australia
- State: New South Wales
- City: Sydney
- LGA: Sutherland Shire
- Location: 22 km (14 mi) south of Sydney CBD

Government
  - State electorate: Miranda
  - Federal division: Cook
- Elevation: 11 m (36 ft)

Population
  - Total: 602 (2021 census)
- Postcode: 2224
Suburbs around Kangaroo Point
Connells Point	Kyle Bay	Blakehurst
Oyster Bay	Kangaroo Point	Sylvania
Kareela	Sylvania Heights	Sylvania

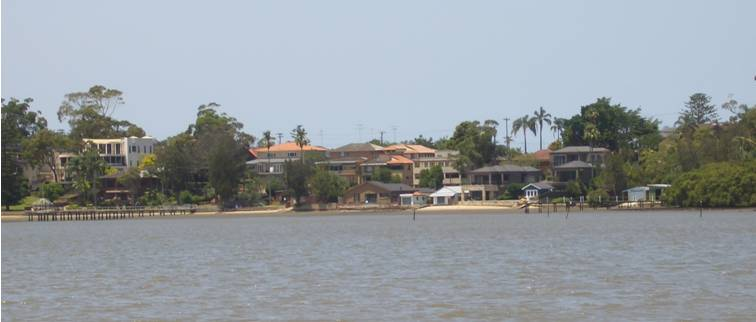
Kangaroo Point, view from Oyster Bay

Kangaroo Point is a tiny suburb in southern Sydney, in the state of New South Wales, Australia. It is 22 kilometres south of the Sydney central business district in the local government area of the Sutherland Shire.

Kangaroo Point takes its name from the peninsula which sits on the southern bank of the Georges River. It is surrounded by the suburb of Sylvania which it was originally part of and still shares the same postcode. The suburbs of Kareela and Oyster Bay are located opposite the waterway of Oyster Bay. Blakehurst, Kyle Bay and Connells Point are located opposite the Georges River.

== History ==
The traditional owners of Kangaroo Point peninsula are the Dharawal Aboriginal people and their archaeological heritage is evident on the peninsula with middens and rockshelters. After European settlement, the peninsula was acquired by John Connell Laycock as a Crown grant. Thomas Holt, a prominent landowner, financier and politician, bought it a few years later along with 13,000 acres (53 km^{2}) across St George and Sutherland Shire. Insurance broker Wynn Roberts took over in 1910 before it was subdivided in 1916. The area used to be regarded as part of Sylvania because it was mostly vacant bushland.

== Population ==
=== Demographics ===
According to the 2021 census, there were 602 people usually resident in Kangaroo Point. 66.1% of people were born in Australia and 48.2% of people spoke only English at home. The most common responses for religion were Eastern Orthodox 27.7% and No Religion 23.1%.

=== Notable residents ===
- Angus Young, guitarist and founding member of AC/DC
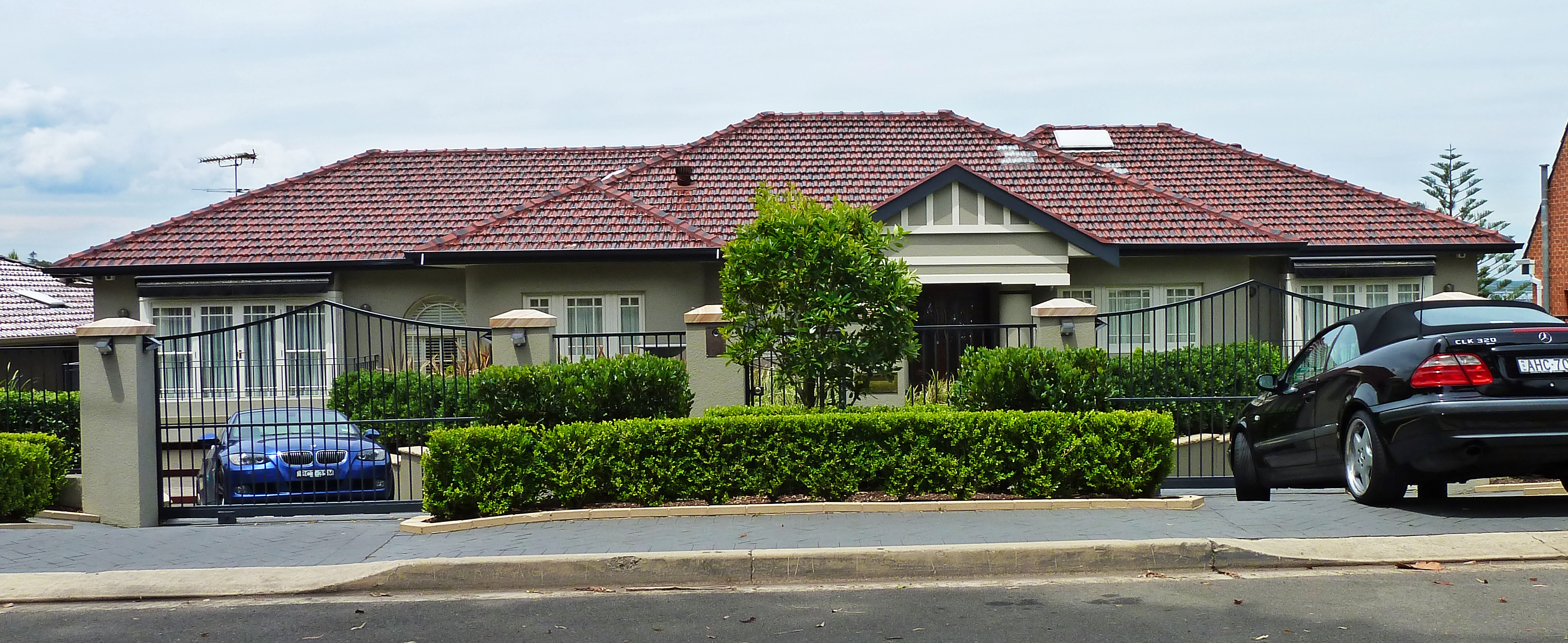
House, 8 Kangaroo Point Road

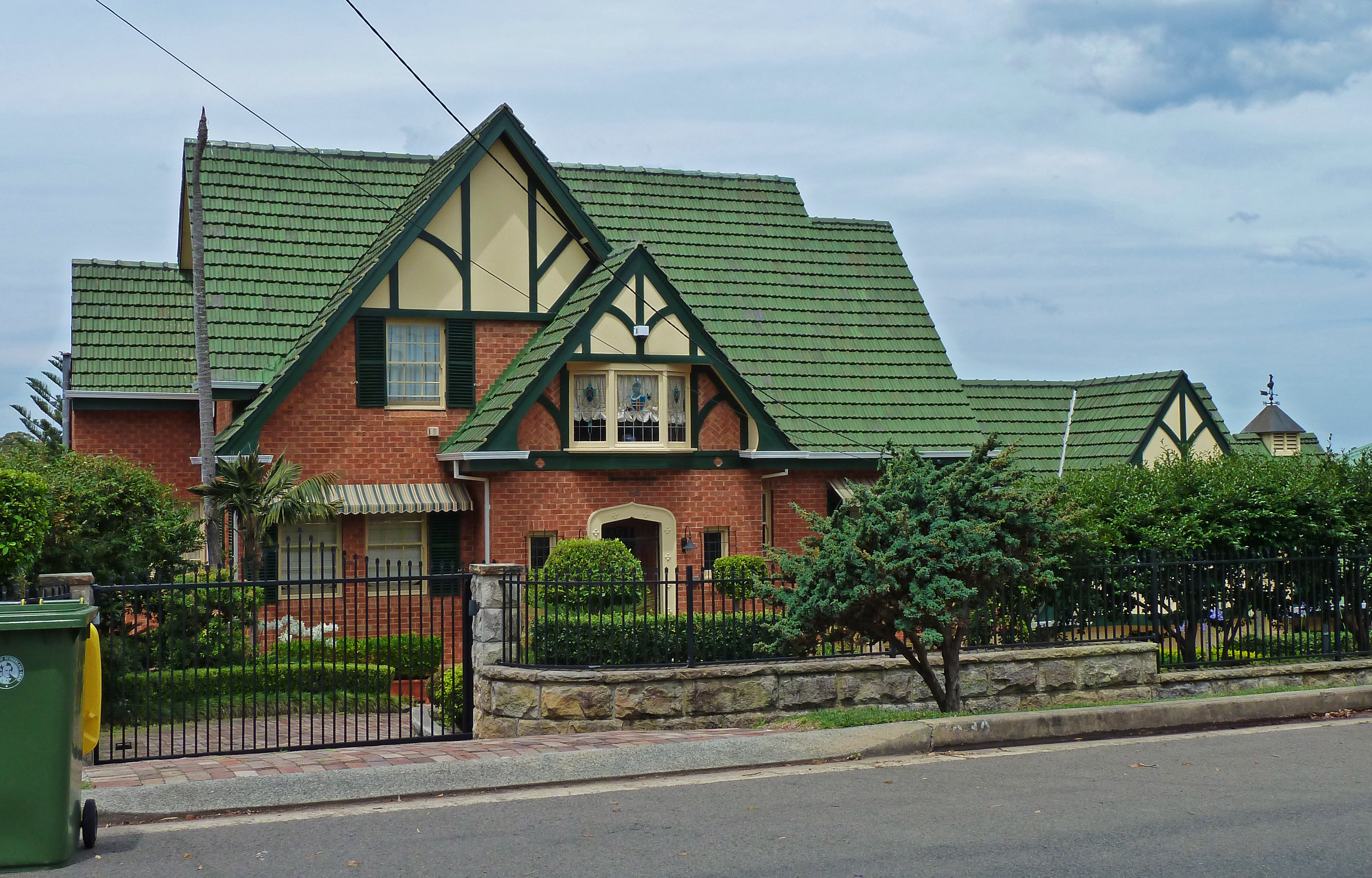
House, 10–12 Kangaroo Point Road

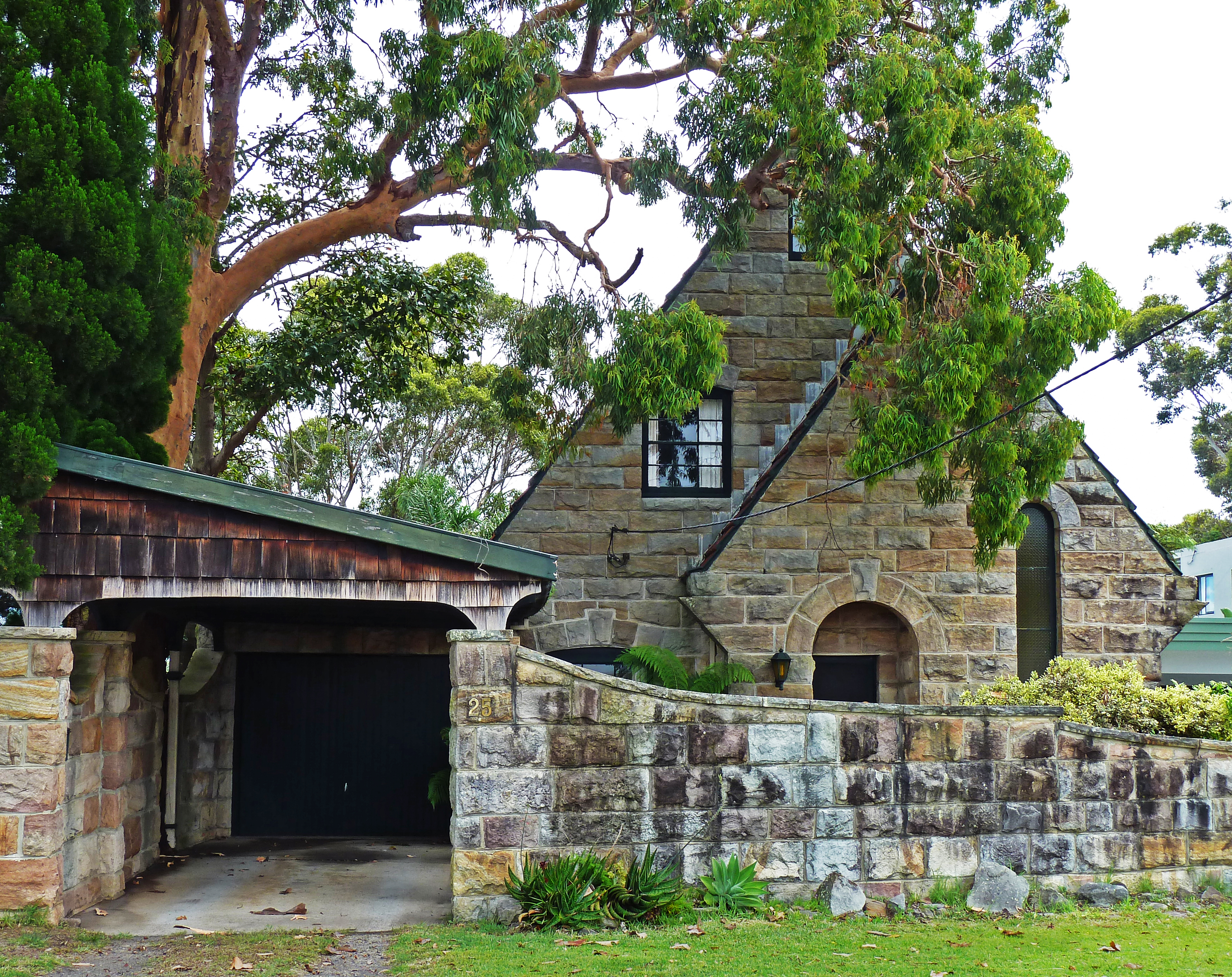
House, 25 Kangaroo Point Road
