= Boggywell Creek =

River in Australia

Coordinates: 33°58′30″S 151°03′00″E

Boggywell

Location
- Country: Australia
- State: New South Wales
- Region: Sydney basin (IBRA), Southern Sydney
- Local government area: Georges River Council

Physical characteristics
- Source: Thorpe Park
  - location: near Beverly Hills
- Mouth: confluence with the Georges River
  - location: Lime Kilns Bay
- Length: 2.5 km (1.6 mi)

Basin features
- River system: Georges River catchment

Boggywell Creek, an urban gully that is part of the Georges River catchment, is located in the southern Sydney district of St George, in New South Wales, Australia.

== Course and features ==
Boggywell Creek rises about 1 kilometre (0.62 mi) north by east of Thorpe Park in the suburb Beverley Hills and flows generally south through the suburb of Peakhurst, including open space at Gannons Park, before reaching its confluence with the Georges River, at Lime Kilns Bay, east of Lugarno. The course of the creek is approximately 2.5 kilometres (1.6 mi).

== See also ==
- Rivers of New South Wales
