= Connells Point =

- Suburb
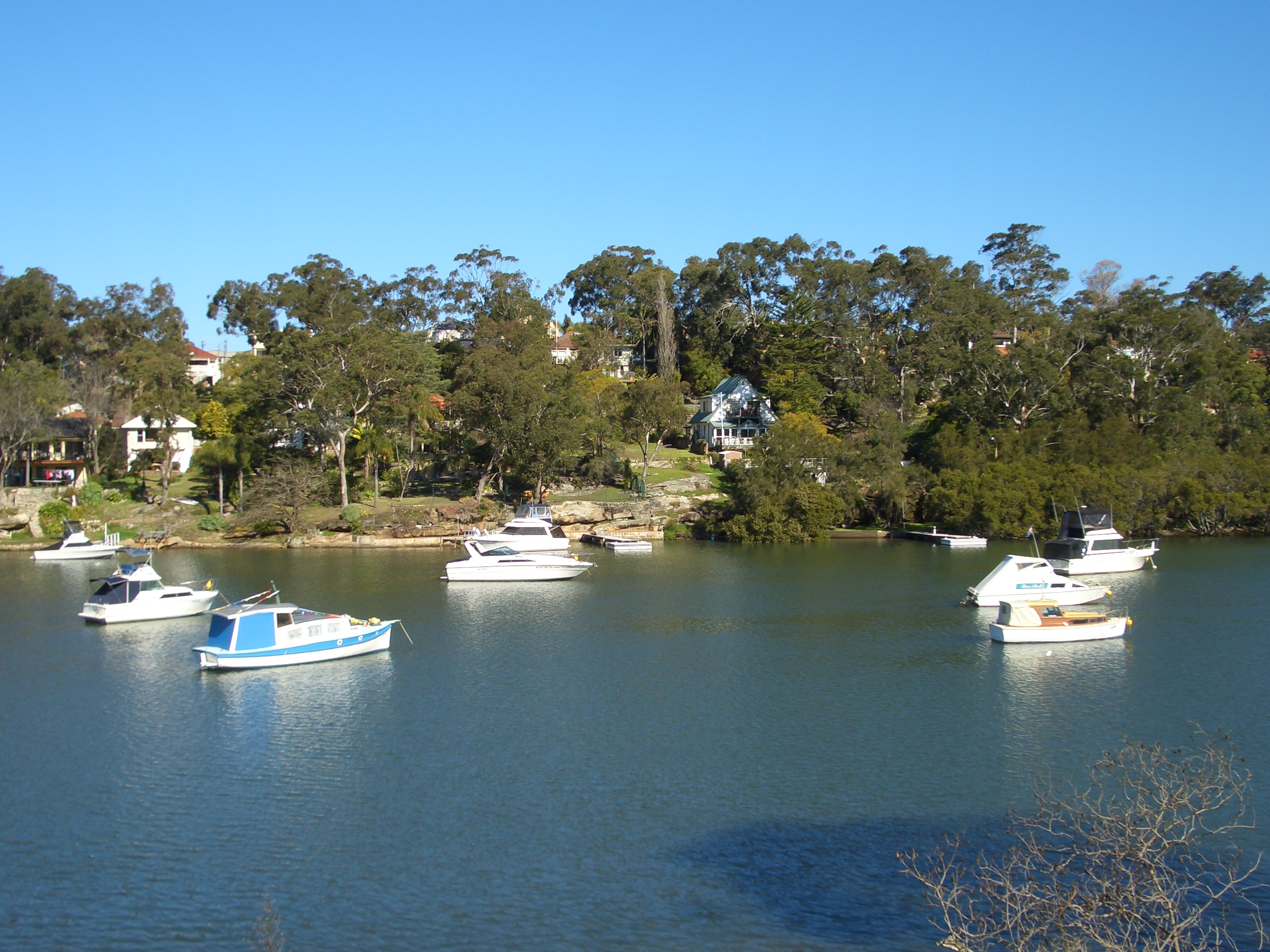
- Oatley Bay

- Interactive map of Connells Point
- Coordinates: 33°58′57″S 151°6′1″E
- Country: Australia
- State: New South Wales
- City: Sydney
- LGA: Georges River Council
- Location: 20 km (12 mi) south of Sydney CBD

Government
  - State electorate: Oatley
  - Federal division: Banks
- Elevation: 24 m (79 ft)

Population
  - Total: 2,884 (2021 census)
- Postcode: 2221
Suburbs around Connells Point
Hurstville Grove	Hurstville	South Hurstville
Oatley	Connells Point	Blakehurst
Oyster Bay	Kangaroo Point	Kyle Bay

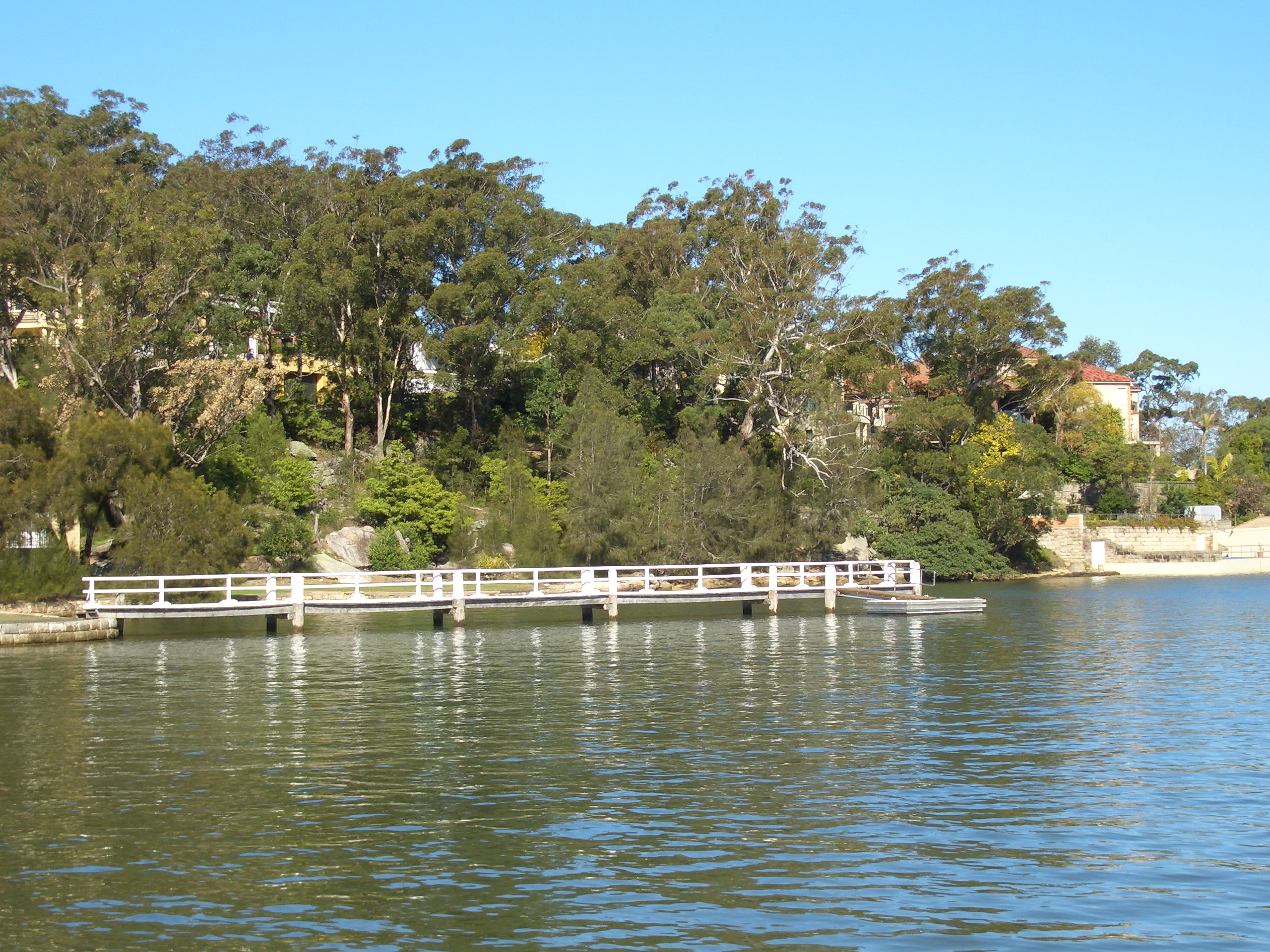
Connells Point, Sailing Club wharf; view from Donnelly Park

Connells Point is a suburb in southern Sydney, in the state of New South Wales, Australia. Connells Point is 20 kilometres south of the Sydney central business district and is part of in the local government area of the Georges River Council, in the St George area.

Connells Point takes its name from the geographical formation beside Connells Bay, on the Georges River. It is a small suburb surrounded by the suburbs of Hurstville Grove and South Hurstville, Blakehurst and Kyle Bay.

== History ==
Connells Point and Connells Bay were named after Charles Daniel O'Connell who held land in the area. Connells Bay was originally called O'Connells Bay. In the early days, the bay was used for shipbuilding. Connells Point Public School was opened in 1933

== Transport ==
The main feeder road into the suburb starts at Woniora Road Hurstville, it passes through South Hurstville at King Georges Road and then to Connells Point. It is appropriately named "Connells Point Road" and follows through the centre of the locality.

== Landmarks ==
- Donnelly Park, Poulton Park, Connells Point Reserve
- Connells Bay, Connells Point, Oatley Bay

== Schools ==
Connells Point has a public primary school; Connells Point Public School, which was established in 1934 and caters for students from Kindergarten to Year 6 in the New South Wales education system. Notable alumni of the school include Robert McLelland, Federal Member for Barton and Attorney-General.

== Sport and recreation ==
- Connells Point has its own football club called Connells Point Rovers FC, who currently play in the St. George Soccer Football Association. Their home ground is Poulton Park.
- The Connells Point Sailing Club is located in Donnelly Park, on the shore of Connells Bay.
- The 1st Kyle Bay Sea Scout Hall is adjacent to the Connells Point Sailing Club.

== Population ==
According to the 2021 census, there were 2,884 people living in Connells Point. 66.9% of people were born in Australia. The next most common country of birth was China at 10.4%. 56.4% of people spoke only English at home. Other languages spoken at home included Mandarin 11.8%, Greek 9.9% and Cantonese 6.3%. The most common responses for religion were Catholic 26.9%, No Religion 24.7%, Eastern Orthodox 18.4% and Anglican 9.3%.
