= Sylvania, New South Wales =

Sylvania
- Suburb
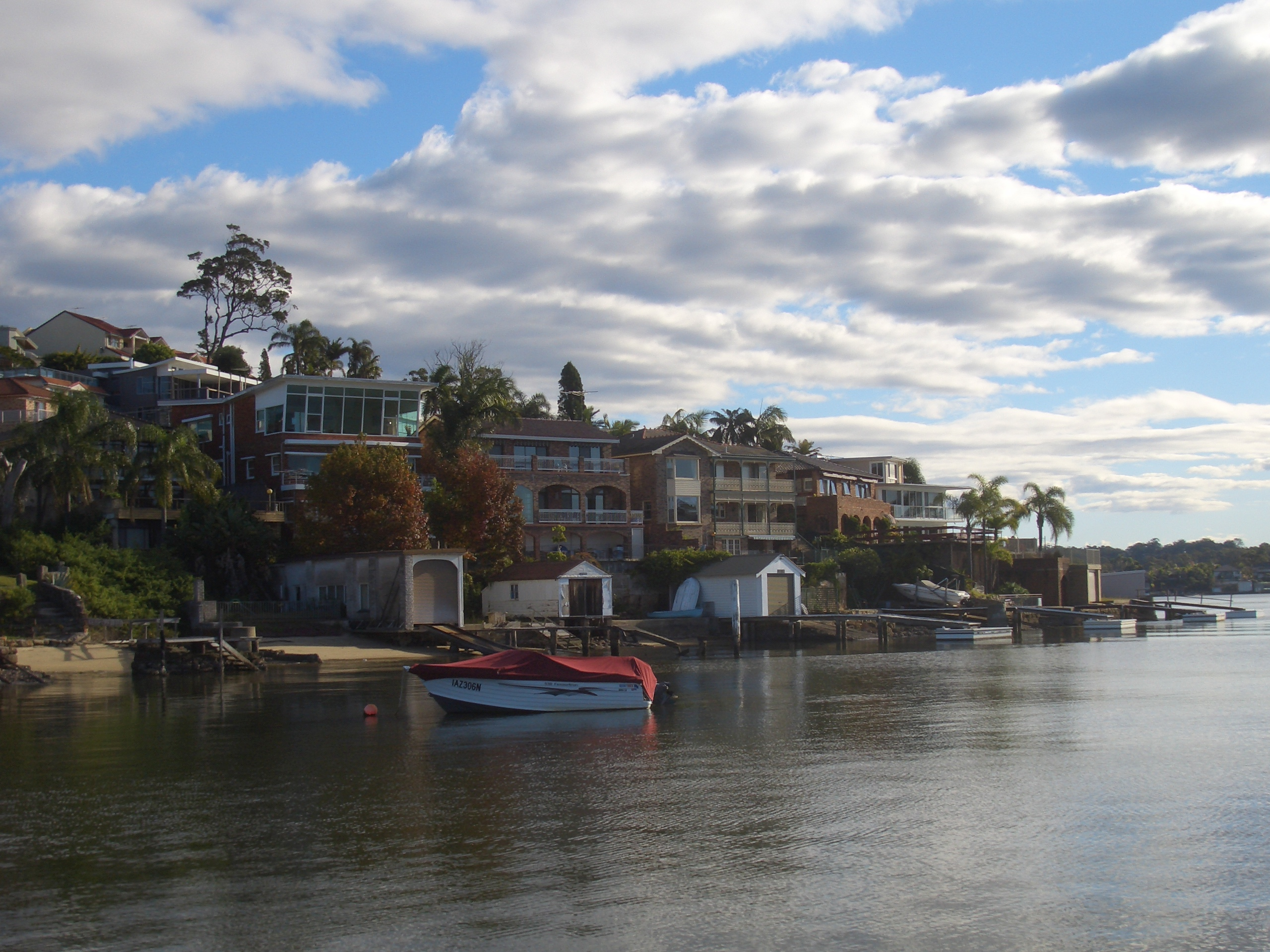
- Georges River at Sylvania

- Interactive map of Sylvania
- Country: Australia
- State: New South Wales
- City: Sydney
- LGA: Sutherland Shire
- Location: 22 km (14 mi) south of Sydney CBD

Government
  - State electorate: Miranda
  - Federal division: Cook
- Elevation: 20 m (66 ft)

Population
  - Total: 10,749 (2021 census)
- Postcode: 2224
Suburbs around Sylvania
Jannali	Kangaroo Point	Blakehurst
Kareela	Sylvania	Sylvania Waters
Kirrawee	Gymea	Miranda

Sylvania is a suburb in southern Sydney, New South Wales, Australia, 22 kilometres (14 miles) south of the Sydney central business district in the Sutherland Shire. It is well known for its large waterfront properties and restaurants.

Sylvania is mostly residential but also contains areas of native bushland and some commercial developments on the Princes Highway and Port Hacking Road. Sylvania Heights is a locality in the western part of the suburb. Sylvania Waters and Kangaroo Point share the same postcode (2224).

== History ==
The traditional owners of Sylvania are the Dharawal Aboriginal people and their archaeological heritage is evident in a number of registered middens, burial and art sites in rock shelters on the Georges River. After European settlement, this land was acquired by John Connell Laycock as a Crown grant. Thomas Holt (after whom Holt Road is named), a prominent landowner, financier and politician, acquired it a few years later as part of the Holt-Sutherland Estate, some 13,000 acres (53 km^{2}; 20 sq mi). The name of the suburb relates to its original wooded vegetation. The word "Sylvania" comes from the Latin word sylvan or sylva which means "forest land".

The native vegetation of the suburb is now fast disappearing, as a result of increased development. Thomas Holt built Sutherland House on the foreshore of Gwawley Bay in 1818, on the eastern side of Sylvania. He established the Sutherland Estate Company in 1881 and a village grew here, with a post office opening in 1883. The school opened in 1884 but closed in 1891 and was not reopened until 1925. Sylvania Heights Public School opened in 1955.

'Sutherland House' no longer stands (only its gate posts survive), but there are a number of heritage-listed buildings in the suburb. They include the original St Mark's timber church (now a Sylvania Public School class room) timber residence in Evelyn Street associated with the Holt Estate; 'Glenn Robin', built by William Glenn Wade on land he acquired in 1949 and completed in 1954; and 'Green Gables' built by Sidney and Clarisse Bayer between 1946 and 1952 on Kangaroo Point.*

In 1913, the 3-hectare (7.4-acre) area bounded by Florida Street, Harrow Street, Mowbray Street and Illawarra Road (now the Princes Highway) was known as the Swastika Estate.

Much of the land of Sylvania Waters was 'reclaimed' from Gwawley Bay, effectively destroying the highly integrated mangrove flora of the bay. Sylvania Waters Estate was developed by L.J.Hooker in the 1960s; land offered had water frontages with boating facilities. Streets were named after Australian rivers to emphasise the association with water, such as Shoalhaven, Tweed, Murrumbidgee, Hawkesbury and Barwon. The suburb has been identified as an area that is particularly vulnerable to inundation, should predictions of climate change, global warming and rising sea levels prove correct.

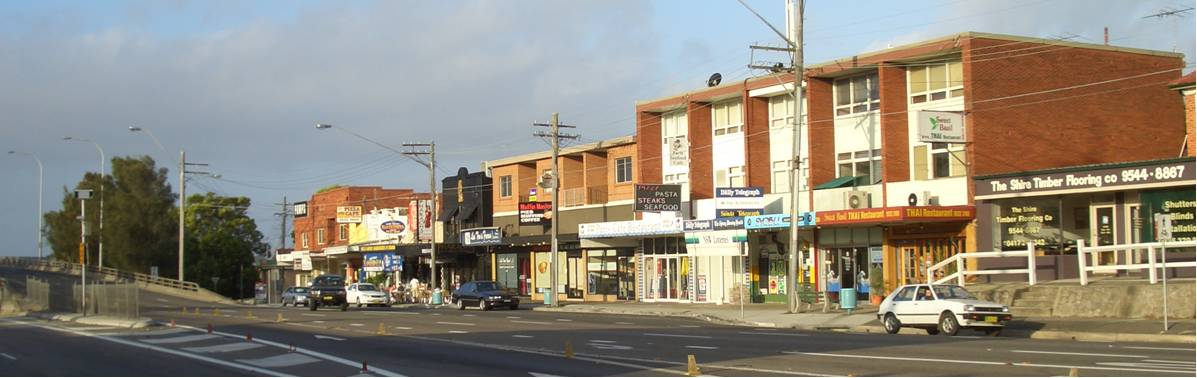
Princes Highway, Sylvania, view towards Tom Uglys Bridge

== Commercial areas ==
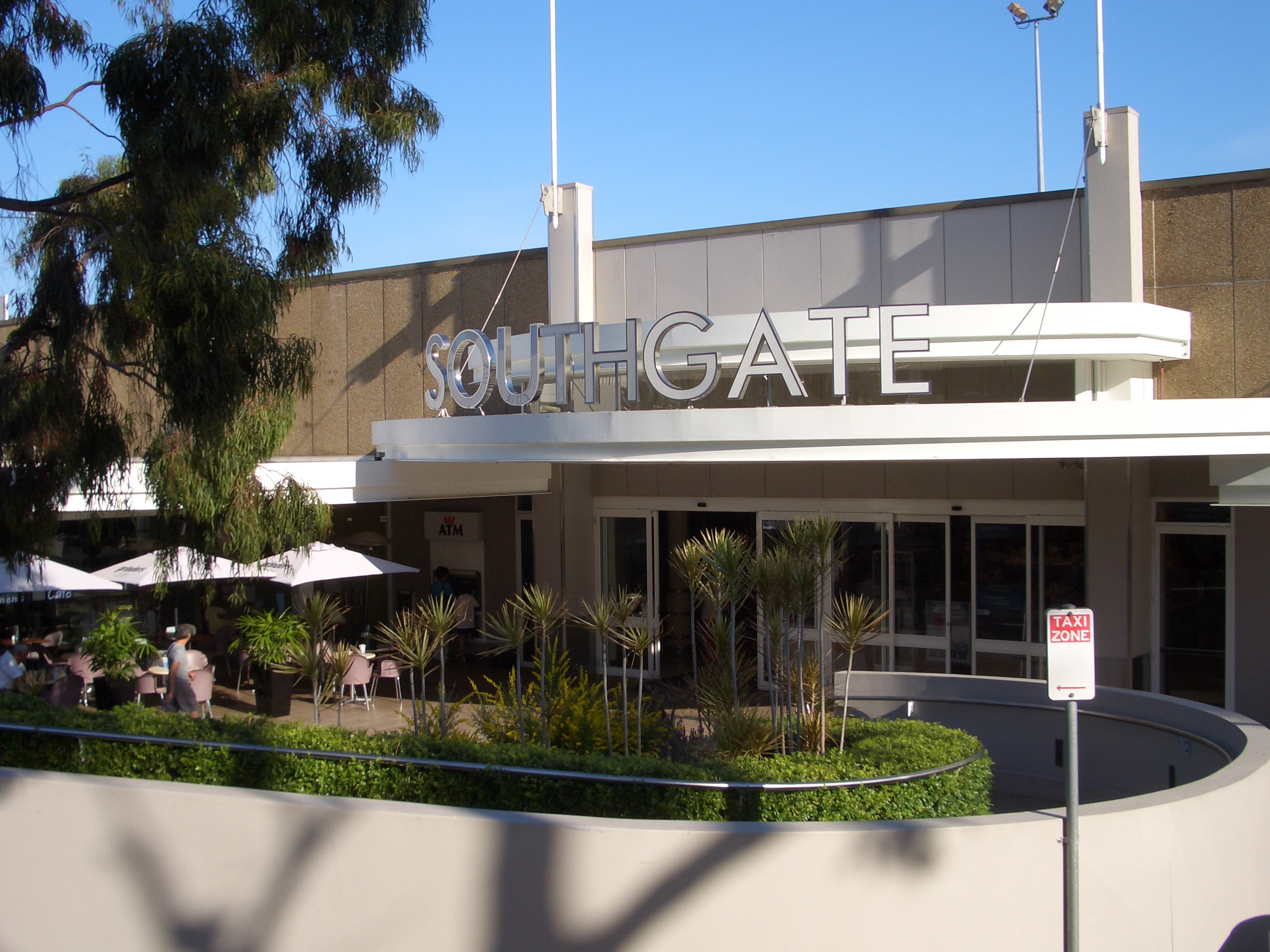
Southgate Shopping Centre

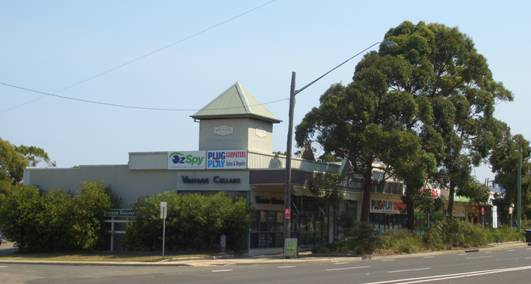
Sylvania Heights Plaza, Princes Highway

Southgate Shopping Centre is located on the corner of the Princes Highway and Port Hacking Road. The shopping centre adjoins The Crest Hotel Sylvania and a McDonald's restaurant.

A small group of shops and restaurants is located on Princes Highway near the foot of Tom Uglys Bridge. Another group of shops known as Sylvania Heights Plaza is located further west along the Princes Highway at Sylvania Heights.

== Transport ==
The Princes Highway crosses the Georges River over the Tom Uglys Bridge at Horse Rock Point and links Sylvania north to Blakehurst, in the St George area. The suburb is serviced by buses operated by U-Go Mobility.

== Schools ==
- Sylvania Heights Public School
- Sylvania High School
- Sylvania Public School

== Churches ==
- Our Lady of the Way Catholic Church
- St Michael's Orthodox Church
- Sylvania Anglican Church
- Sylvania Uniting Church
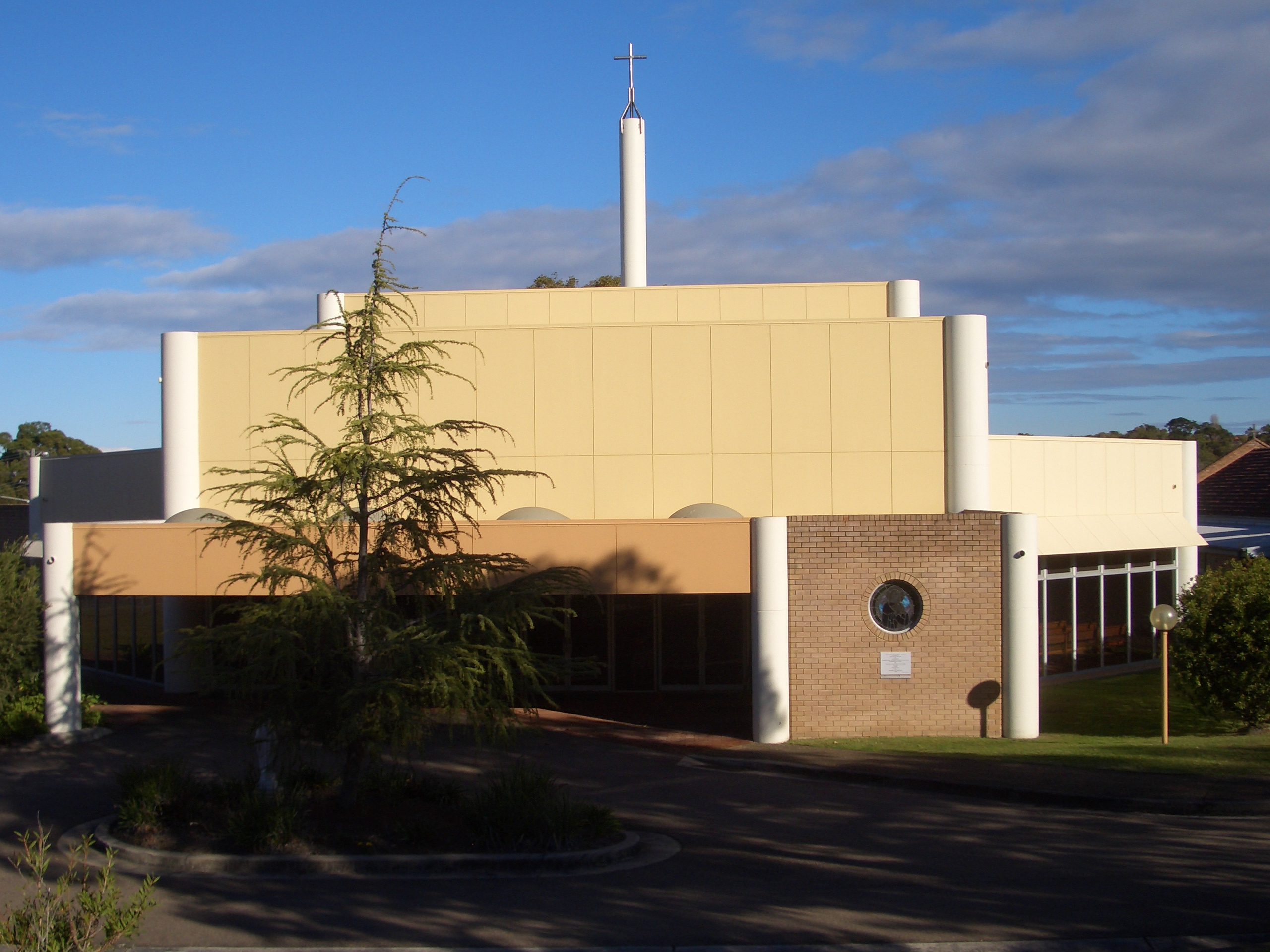
Our Lady of the Way Catholic Church

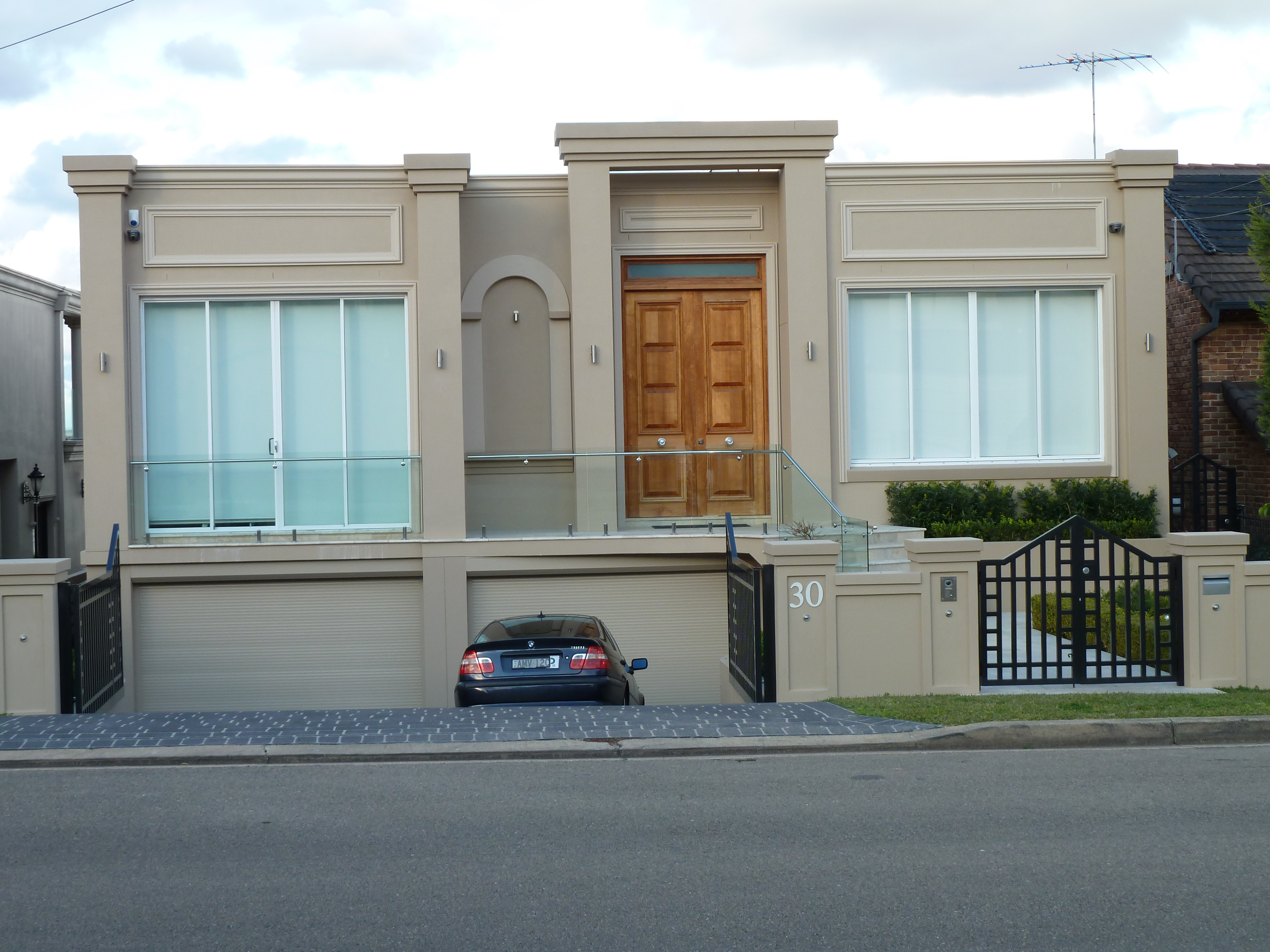
House, Belgrave Esplanade

== Demographics ==
According to the 2021 census of Population, there were 10,749 people usually resident in Sylvania. 71.9% stated they were Australian-born. 3.3% were born in China, 2.5% in England, 1.8% in Greece, 1.5% in New Zealand and 1.3% in Egypt. English was stated as the only language spoken at home by 70.8% of residents and the most common other languages spoken were Greek 6.6%, Mandarin 3.5%, Arabic 2.4%, Cantonese 2.4% and Macedonian 1.5%. The most common responses for religion were Catholic 26.2%, No Religion 25.8%, Anglican 14.2%, Orthodox 13.7% and Not stated 4.8%.

== Notable residents ==
- Graham Annesley – former politician and rugby league referee
- Myles Baldwin – horticulturalist
- Brielle Davis – recording artist
- Jim Russell – cartoonist
- Glenn Wheeler – media personality
