= Southern Sydney =

Region of Sydney, Australia

- Region
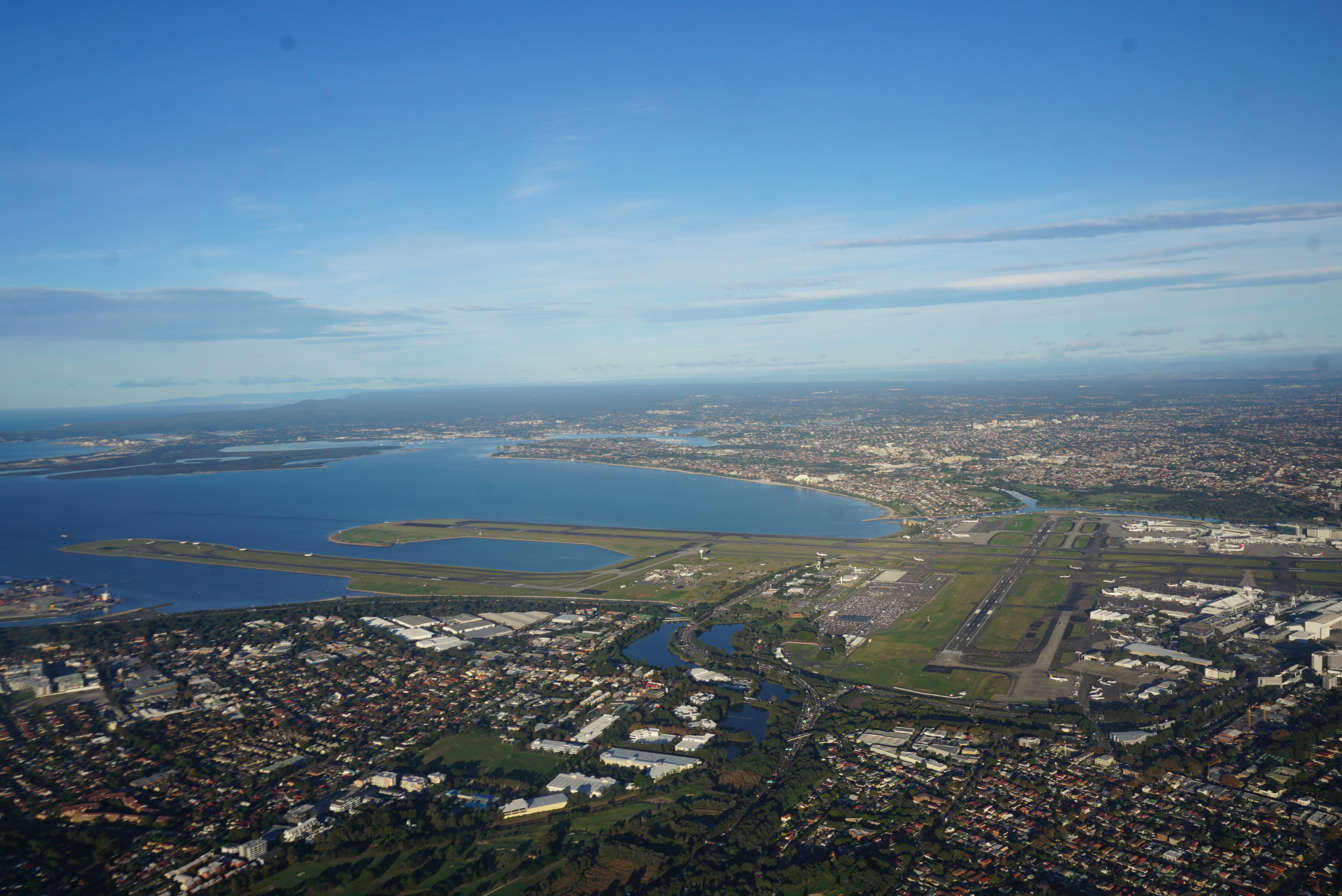
- Sydney Airport, Botany Bay and surrounding suburbs
- Country: Australia
- State: New South Wales
- LGAs: Sydney; Georges River; Bayside; Sutherland

Government
  - State electorate: Cronulla, Heathcote, Heffron, Kogarah, Miranda, Oatley, Rockdale
  - Federal division: Banks, Barton, Cook, Hughes, Sydney, Kingsford Smith

Southern Sydney, also commonly referred to as the Southern suburbs, is the southern metropolitan area of Greater Sydney, in the state of New South Wales, Australia.

Southern Sydney is a title for the regions and neighbourhoods which fall directly south and south-west of the Sydney CBD from the southern boundaries of Central station down to Sydney Airport and St George region around the southern and western shores of Botany Bay with the southern most concluding point being the Sutherland Shire. This includes all the suburbs in the local government areas of Georges River Council, The Sutherland Shire, most of Bayside Council and the southern suburbs of City of Sydney. The Australian Bureau of Statistics defines a statistical area called The St George-Sutherland Statistical Subdivision and The City and Inner South Statistical Subdivision.

Because the regions that make up Southern Sydney are mostly separated by Botany Bay and The Georges River, rather than directly bordering each other, occasionally suburbs on the eastern shore of Botany Bay are included within Southern Sydney.

The Southern Sydney councils participate in the Southern Sydney Regional Organisation of Councils (SSROC) along with six other councils in the city, Eastern Suburbs and Inner West regions.

The southern suburbs of Sydney can be grouped into three regions: the Inner South, St George and the Sutherland Shire.

== Inner South ==
The Inner Southern Suburbs of Sydney, sometimes referred to as 'South Sydney' include the southern suburbs of City of Sydney as well as some of Bayside Council. The area encompasses the suburbs directly south of Central station or more specifically Cleveland Street leading all the way down to Sydney Airport and fall west of the Eastern Distributor but east of the Alexandra Canal. The area starts with Redfern then continues down through Eveleigh, Waterloo, Zetland, Alexandria, Beaconsfield, Rosebery, Eastlakes (West of Eastern Distributor) and ends in Mascot.

The postcodes start at 2015 and end in 2020 with the suburbs of Botany and Banksmeadow being the exception having the postcode of 2019 which while being geographically south of the CBD along with the included suburbs are actually on the other side of the Eastern Distributor usually deeming them Eastern Suburbs that are south-east of CBD rather than part of South Sydney.

The region consists of three train stations being Redfern, Green Square and Mascot as well as one Metro station in Waterloo. Green Square is a locality situated at the meeting point of Alexandria, Zetland, Waterloo, and Beaconsfield. Green Square and Mascot station are on the Airport Link completed in 2000 which is part of the T8 Airport & South Line. Many of these suburbs were predominantly industrial and commercial but have now developed into new residential neighbourhoods of high rise apartments.

The Inner Southern Suburbs are sometimes considered inner city or included as part of the Eastern Suburbs that are south-east of CBD however strictly speaking these suburbs geographically are neither east nor south-east of the Sydney CBD.

== St George ==
The St George area, considered the southern suburbs includes all the suburbs in the Georges River Council and the western part of Bayside Council which was Rockdale City prior to 2016. This is everything within the boundaries of Salt Pan Creek to the west, The Georges River to the south, Botany Bay to the east and the M5 Motorway and Wolli Creek to the north. This area corresponds to the southern portion of the cadastral Parish of St George, from which the region derives its name.

The northern portion of the Parish of St George that is north of the M5 and Wolli Creek but south of The Cooks River is considered South-Western Sydney rather than Southern Sydney. This northern portion of the cadastral parish was formerly in the City of Canterbury but now within the amalgamated City of Canterbury-Bankstown. In some instances the whole cadastral Parish of St George (both north and south) is grouped together and considered the inner south-west due to its geographical location from Sydney CBD.

== Sutherland Shire ==
The Sutherland Shire is the area to the south of Botany Bay and the Georges River. The Sutherland Shire is 26 kilometres (16 mi) south of the Sydney CBD, and is bordered by the City of Canterbury-Bankstown, and Georges River Council local government areas.

The administrative centre of the local government is located in the suburb of Sutherland.

== Suburbs in Southern Sydney ==
=== Inner South ===
- Alexandria
- Beaconsfield
- Eastlakes (west of Eastern Distributor)
- Eveleigh
- Green Square (locality)
- Mascot
- Redfern
- Rosebery
- Waterloo
- Zetland

=== St George ===
- Allawah
- Arncliffe
- Banksia
- Bardwell Park
- Bardwell Valley
- Bexley
- Bexley North
- Beverley Park
- Beverly Hills
- Blakehurst
- Brighton-Le-Sands
- Carlton
- Carss Park
- Connells Point
- Dolls Point
- Hurstville
- Hurstville Grove
- Kingsgrove
- Kogarah
- Kogarah Bay
- Kyeemagh
- Kyle Bay
- Lugarno
- Monterey
- Mortdale
- Narwee
- Oatley
- Peakhurst
- Penshurst
- Ramsgate
- Ramsgate Beach
- Riverwood
- Rockdale
- Sandringham
- Sans Souci
- South Hurstville
- Turrella
- Wolli Creek

=== Sutherland Shire Suburbs ===
- Alfords Point
- Bangor
- Barden Ridge
- Bonnet Bay
- Bundeena
- Burraneer
- Caringbah
- Caringbah South
- Como
- Cronulla
- Dolans Bay
- Engadine
- Grays Point
- Greenhills Beach
- Gymea
- Gymea Bay
- Heathcote
- Illawong
- Jannali
- Kangaroo Point
- Kareela
- Kirrawee
- Kurnell
- Lilli Pilli
- Loftus
- Lucas Heights
- Maianbar
- Menai
- Miranda
- Oyster Bay
- Port Hacking
- Sandy Point
- Sutherland
- Sylvania
- Sylvania Waters
- Taren Point
- Waterfall
- Woolooware
- Woronora
- Woronora Heights
- Yarrawarrah
- Yowie Bay

Localities administered by the Sutherland Shire are:

- Audley
- Caravan Head
- Como West
- Elouera
- Garie Beach
- Gundamaian
- North Cronulla
- North Engadine
- Shelly Beach
- Sylvania Heights
- Wanda Beach
- Warumbul
