= Blakehurst =

- Suburb
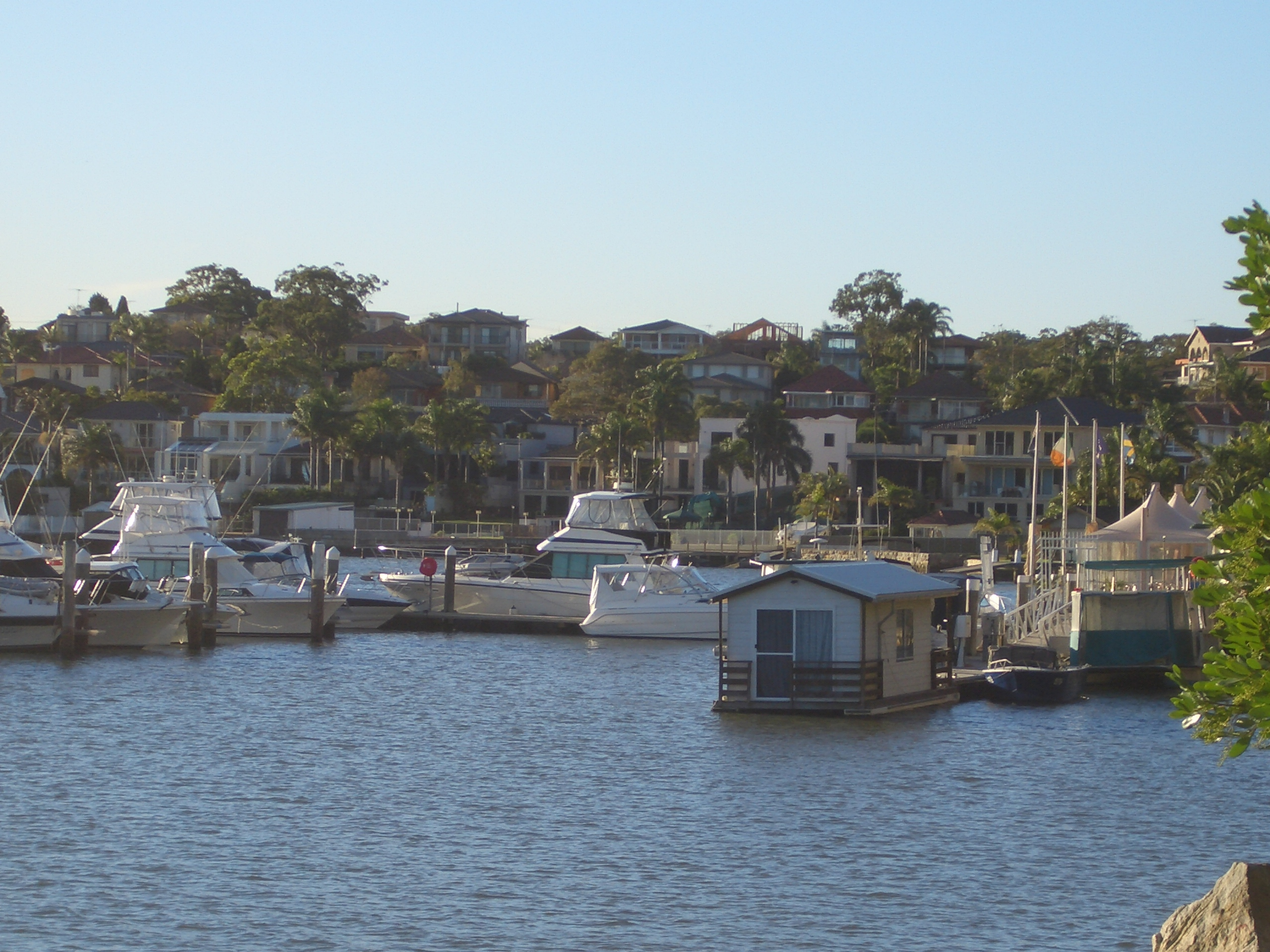
- Blakehurst marina

- Interactive map of Blakehurst
- Coordinates: 33°59′23″S 151°6′35″E
- Country: Australia
- State: New South Wales
- City: Sydney
- LGA: Georges River Council
- Location: 18 km (11 mi) south of Sydney CBD

Government
  - State electorates: Oatley; Kogarah
  - Federal divisions: Banks; Barton
- Elevation: 20 m (66 ft)

Population
  - Total: 6,652 (2021 census)
- Postcode: 2221
Suburbs around Blakehurst
South Hurstville	Carlton	Kogarah Bay
Connells Point	Blakehurst	Carss Park
Kyle Bay	Sylvania	Sans Souci

Blakehurst is a suburb in southern Sydney, in the state of New South Wales, Australia 18 kilometres south of the Sydney central business district, in the local government area of the Georges River Council. It is part of the St George area.

Blakehurst is connected to Sylvania, in the Sutherland Shire, to the south, by Tom Uglys Bridge over the Georges River. Tom Uglys Point is the southernmost part. The eastern border runs along Kogarah Bay and the western border runs along Kyle Bay.

== History ==
Blakehurst was named after William Blake, road assessor and postmaster for Cooks River in 1863. Blake ran a small farm in this area that was originally part of a land grant of 75 acres (300,000 m^{2}) to Robert Townson in 1808.

A punt was established in 1864 at Tom Uglys Point or Punt Point. A few tales have been told about the origin of the name possibly being mispronunciation by local Aborigines of the names of two locals, Tom Huxley or Tom Woguly. However, it is now believed that it was named after an Aboriginal man from the south coast called 'Towwaa' or Toweiry', who later lived and died at the point. His nickname was Tom Ugly.

Tom Uglys Bridge was originally known as Georges River Bridge when it first opened in 1929. The second crossing at this location was opened in 1987.

== Heritage listings ==
Blakehurst has a number of heritage-listed sites, including:

- 9 Stuart Crescent: Thurlow House

== Commercial area ==
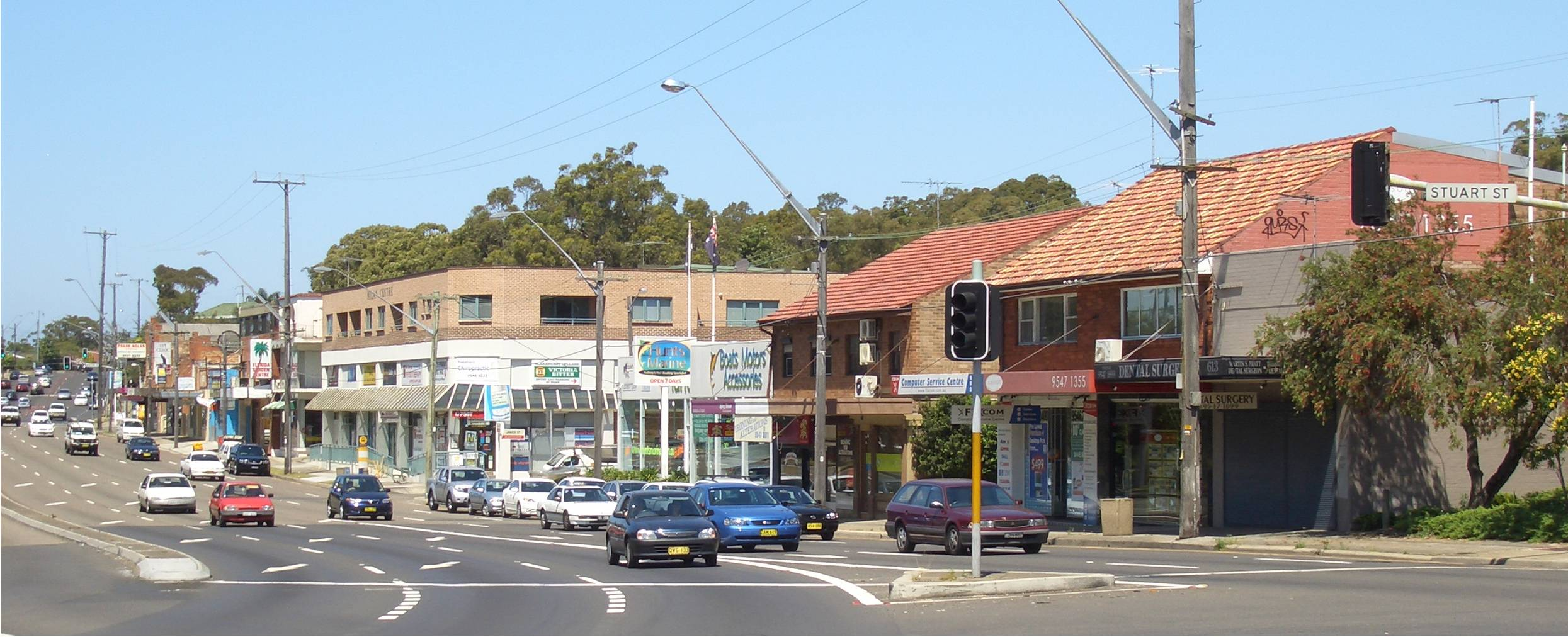
Princes Highway intersection with King Georges Road

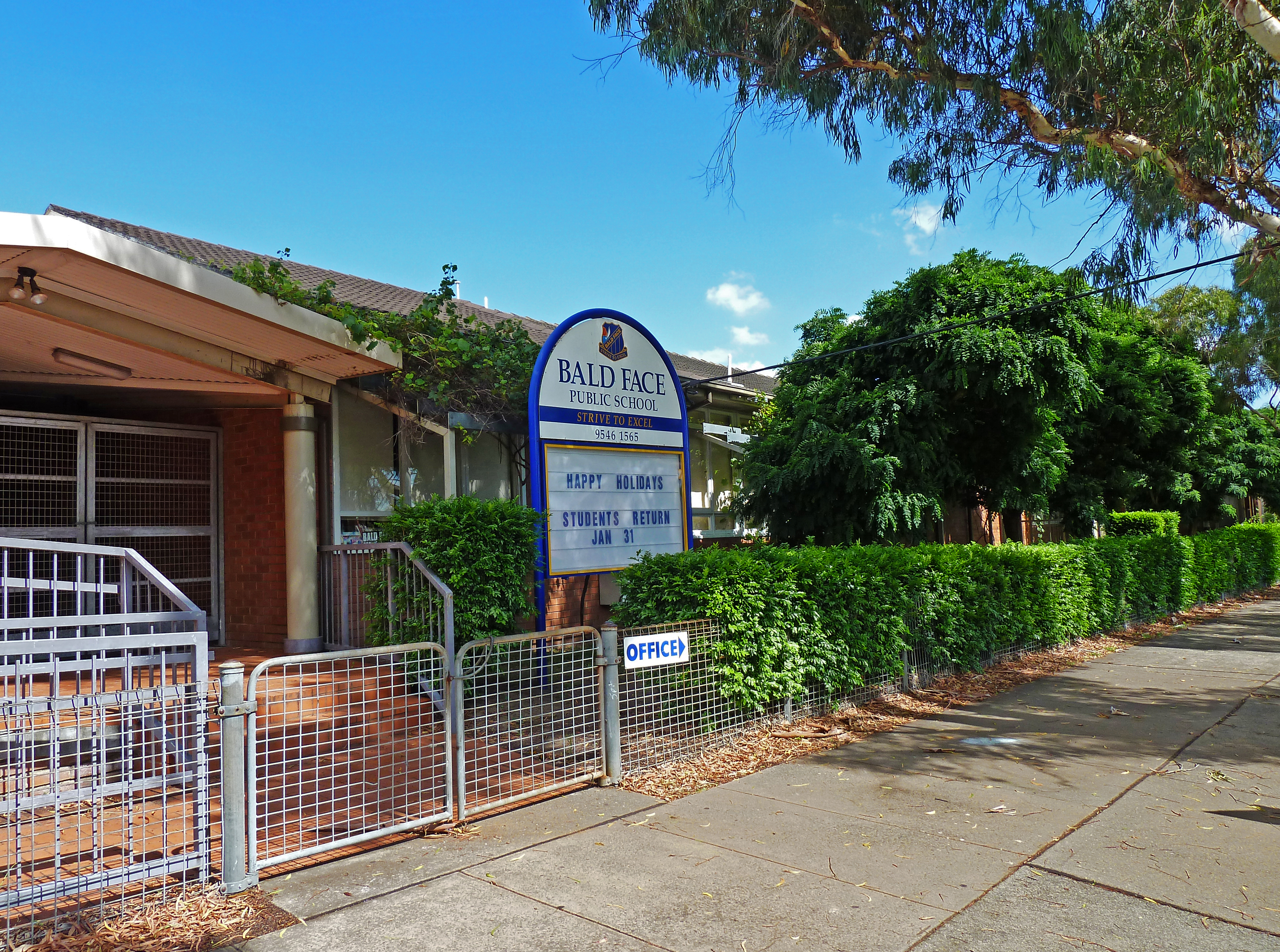
Bald Face Public School

A small shopping strip is located on the Princes Highway near the intersection with King Georges Road. Commercial developments also extend north along these two main roads. A bus service runs between Hurstville and Miranda via Blakehurst and Sylvania.

Tom Uglys Point features a couple of small reserves, fishing spots, a marina, seafood restaurants and a number of take-away seafood shops.

== Transportation ==
The Princes Highway is the main road passing through Blakehurst. The nearest railway station is in nearby Hurstville. Blakehurst is served by 3 bus routes (959, 970 and 971) taking commuters to the nearby Southgate shopping centre in the suburb of Sylvania, and these routes take commuters to Hurstville and Miranda .

== Schools ==
There are both public and catholic schools in Blakehurst. Mater Dei Primary School is a Catholic-run primary school. Blakehurst High School, Blakehust Public School and Bald Face Public School are public schools.

== Sport and recreation ==
Blakehurst has many sporting teams including the rugby union team, The Blakehurst Blues. Past famous players and locals include ex-Wallaby star Phil Kearns and current Waikato forward Toby Lind. Kogarah Bay Sailing Club and marina is located on Princes Highway.

== Demographics ==
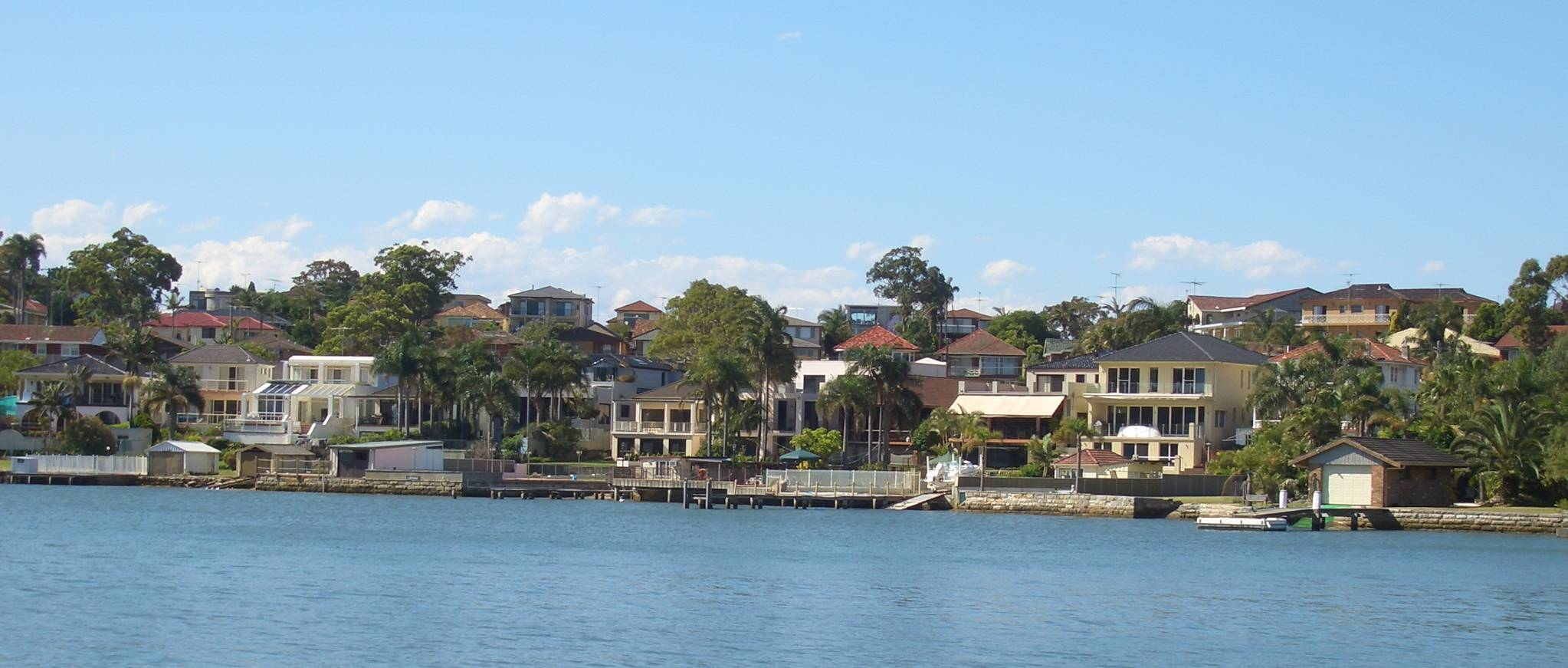
View from Shipwrights Bay

According to the 2021 census, there were 6,652 people usually resident in Blakehurst. 63.3% of people were born in Australia. The next most common countries of birth were China 8.6%, Greece 2.9%, Hong Kong 2.4% and Lebanon 2.0%. 49.7% of people only spoke English at home. Other languages spoken at home included Greek 11.9%, Mandarin 8.1%, Cantonese 7.8%, Arabic 5.4% and Macedonian 2.3%. The most common responses for religious affiliation were Eastern Orthodox 22.9%, Catholic 21.9%, No Religion 21.8% and Anglican 7.5%.

== Notable people ==
- Billy Wilson, rugby league player
