= South Hurstville =

- Suburb
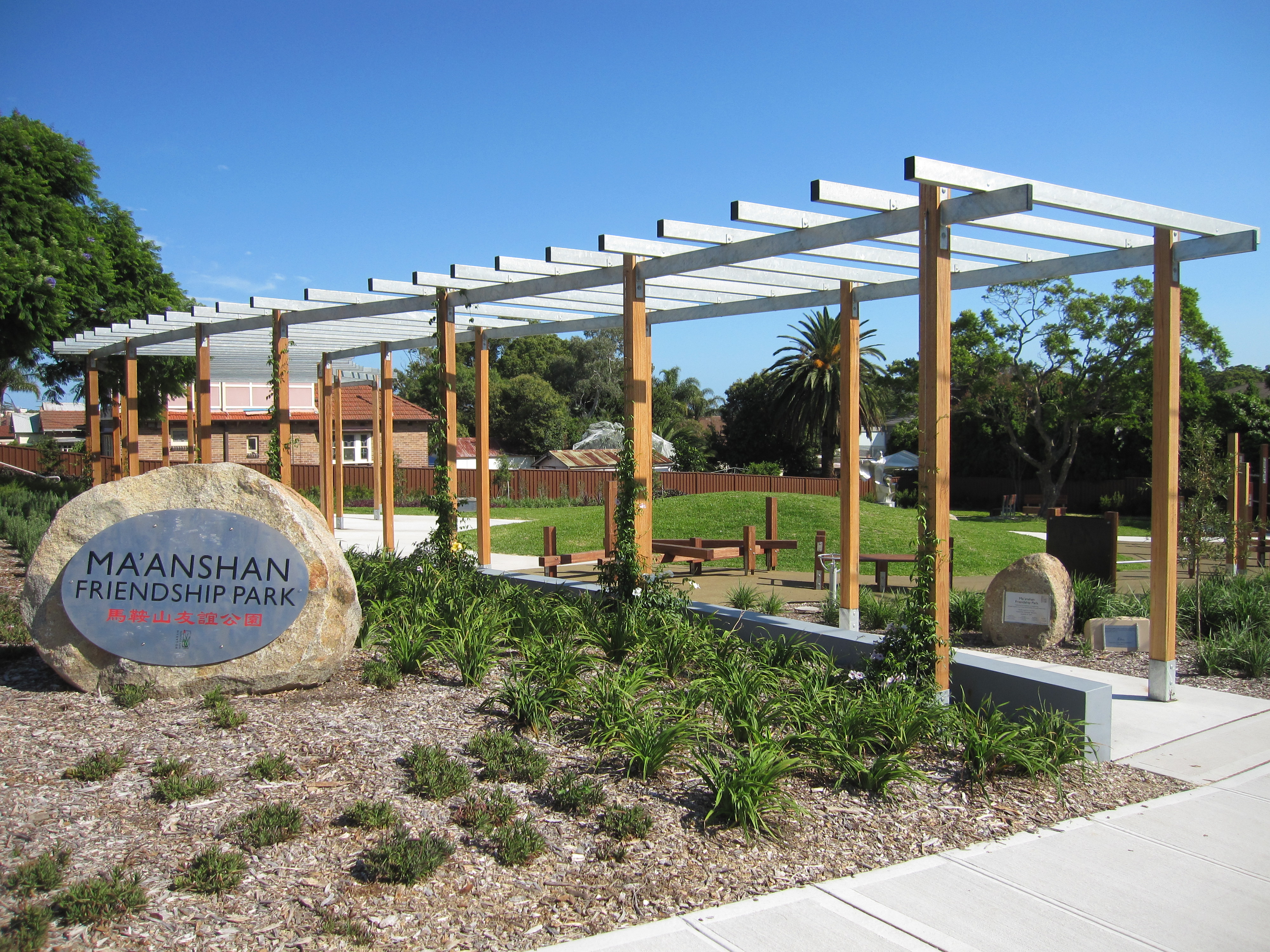
- Ma'anshan Friendship Park

- Interactive map of South Hurstville
- Coordinates: 33°58′48″S 151°6′13″E
- Country: Australia
- State: New South Wales
- City: Sydney
- LGA: Georges River Council
- Location: 18 km (11 mi) south of Sydney CBD

Government
  - State electorates: Kogarah; Oatley
  - Federal divisions: Banks; Barton
- Elevation: 44 m (144 ft)

Population
  - Total: 5,221 (2021 census)
- Postcode: 2221
Suburbs around South Hurstville
Hurstville	Hurstville	Allawah
Hurstville Grove	South Hurstville	Kogarah Bay
Connells Point	Blakehurst	Carlton

South Hurstville is a suburb in the St George area of Southern Sydney, 18 kilometres south of the Sydney central business district. South Hurstville is in the local government area of the Georges River Council. Hurstville and Hurstville Grove are separate neighbouring suburbs.

== History ==
The Hurstville area was granted to Captain John Townson and his brother Robert Townson in 1808; Captain Townson was granted 1,950 acres (7.9 km^{2}) which was on the land now occupied by the suburb of Hurstville and parts of Bexley, while Robert was granted the land which is now occupied by Penshurst, Mortdale, and parts of Peakhurst. The next year, Captain Townson was granted an additional 250 acres (1.0 km^{2}) in the area now occupied by Kingsgrove and Beverly Hills. The Townson brothers, however, were not happy with the heavily timbered land that they were given because it was not suitable for the farming of sheep for wool; consequently, it is likely that the brothers never occupied their land.

The land was sold to a wealthy merchant named Simeon Lord (1771–1840) in 1812, who called his land Lord's Bush. When Simeon Lord died, the land became the property of John Rose Holden and James Holt of the Bank of New South Wales.

The land was sold to Michael Gannon (1800–1861) in 1850 and became known as Gannon's Forest. The Gannon's Forest post office opened in 1881. The local school was known as Hurstville by School Inspector MacIntyre in 1876. When the railway arrived in 1884, the station took the name "Hurstville" from the school. Hurstville municipality was incorporated in 1887.

== Commercial area ==
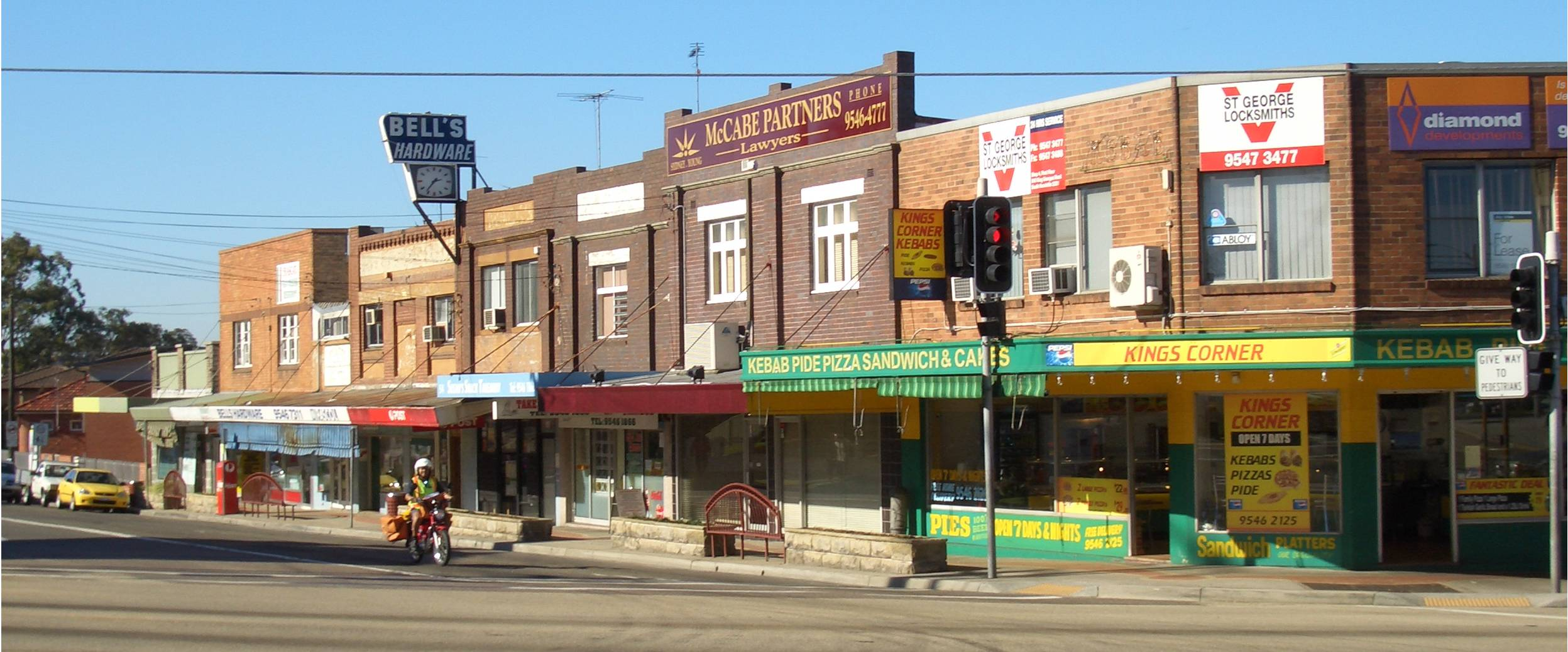
Connells Point Road

South Hurstville is mainly residential with a small commercial/shopping area. A conventional style shopfront strip is located around King Georges Road and Connells Point Road. The Kings Head Tavern is a landmark at this location as well. An IGA Supa supermarket, McDonald's, Fast Food outlet, BWS Liquor store are located nearby. A light industrial area is located in lower Halstead Street, alongside fitness businesses.

== Places of worship ==
- St Marks Anglican Church
- South Hurstville Uniting Church
- South Hurstville Christian Brethren Church
- St Raphael's Catholic Church

== Schools ==
Hurstville South Public School is located on Maher Street (technically in Hurstville); St. Raphael's Catholic Primary School on George Street.

== Transport ==
Veolia Transport runs services through South Hurstville. Routes 970 and 971 Miranda via Sylvania Heights and Sylvania Heights to Hurstville. Route 959 from Bald Face at Blakehurst to Hurstville. Punchbowl Bus Company runs Route 953 Hurstville via Kyle Bay, Connells Point and South Hurstville (Loop service).

== Landmarks ==
- South Hurstville Library
- Poulton Park

== Population ==
In the 2021 Census, there were 5,221 people in South Hurstville. 49.1% of people were born in Australia. The next most common countries of birth were China (18.0%), Hong Kong (3.7%) and Lebanon (2.3%). 36.4% of people spoke only English at home. Other languages spoken at home included Mandarin (16.9%), Cantonese (13.9%), Arabic (6.0%), Greek (5.2%) and Macedonian (2.3%).

The most common responses for religious affiliation were No Religion (33.1%), Catholic (18.6%) and Eastern Orthodox (10.0%).

== Gallery ==
Civic Video, Subway and The Daily Telegraph (closed mid-2016)
