= St George, Sydney =

Region of Sydney, Australia

Coordinates: 33°57′S 151°06′E

St George
- Region
- Country: Australia
- State: New South Wales
- City: Sydney
- LGAs: Georges River; Bayside

Government
  - State electorates: Heffron; Kogarah; Maroubra; Oatley; Rockdale
  - Federal divisions: Banks; Barton; Cook; Kingsford Smith

Population
  - Total: 285,214

The St George region of Sydney is part of the southern suburbs of Sydney, in the state of New South Wales, Australia. The area includes all the suburbs in the local government area of Georges River Council and the part of Bayside Council which was Rockdale City prior to 2016. This is everything within the boundaries of Salt Pan Creek to the west, The Georges River to the south, Botany Bay to the east and the M5 Motorway and Wolli Creek to the north. This area corresponds to the southern portion of the cadastral Parish of St George, from which the region derives its name and the area was later covered by the St George County Council, the electricity supplier for the councils in this region. This southern portion of the parish below The M5 and Wolli Creek is the more contemporary definition of The St George Region that is considered part of Southern Sydney.

The northern portion of the Parish of St George that's north of the M5 and Wolli Creek but south of the Cooks River is considered South-Western Sydney rather than Southern Sydney. This northern portion of the cadastral parish was formerly in the City of Canterbury but now within the amalgamated City of Canterbury-Bankstown. In some instances, the whole cadastral Parish of St George (both north and south) is grouped together and considered the inner south-west due to its geographical location from Sydney CBD.

== History ==
=== Indigenous Australians ===
The first inhabitants of the St George area were Australian Aboriginals. At the time of the arrival of the First Fleet, the Eora tribe inhabited land from Port Jackson to Botany Bay and the Georges River. There is evidence to suggest that these people belonged to the Gweagal, Bidjigal and Cadigal clans.

=== European settlement ===
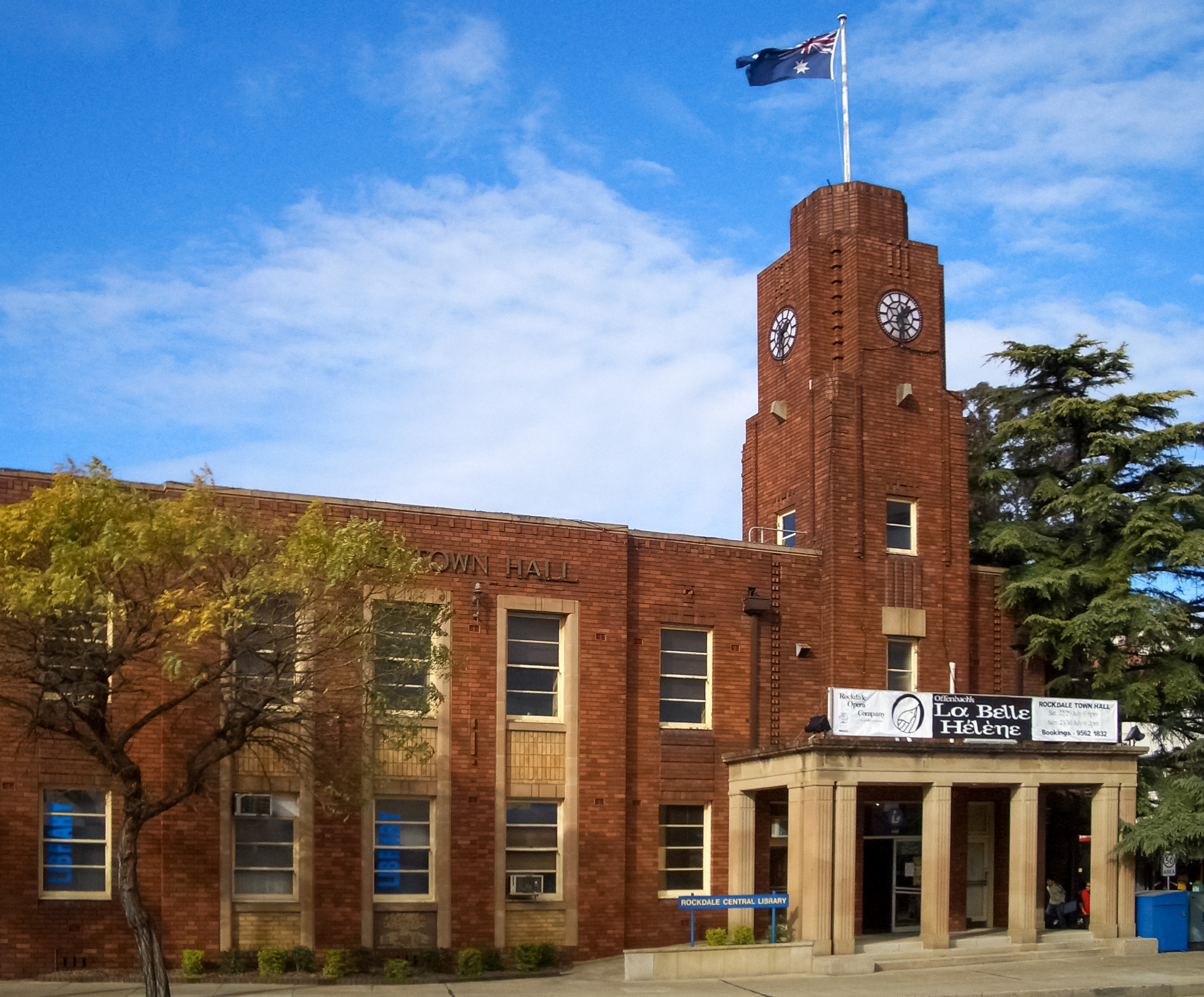
Rockdale Town Hall

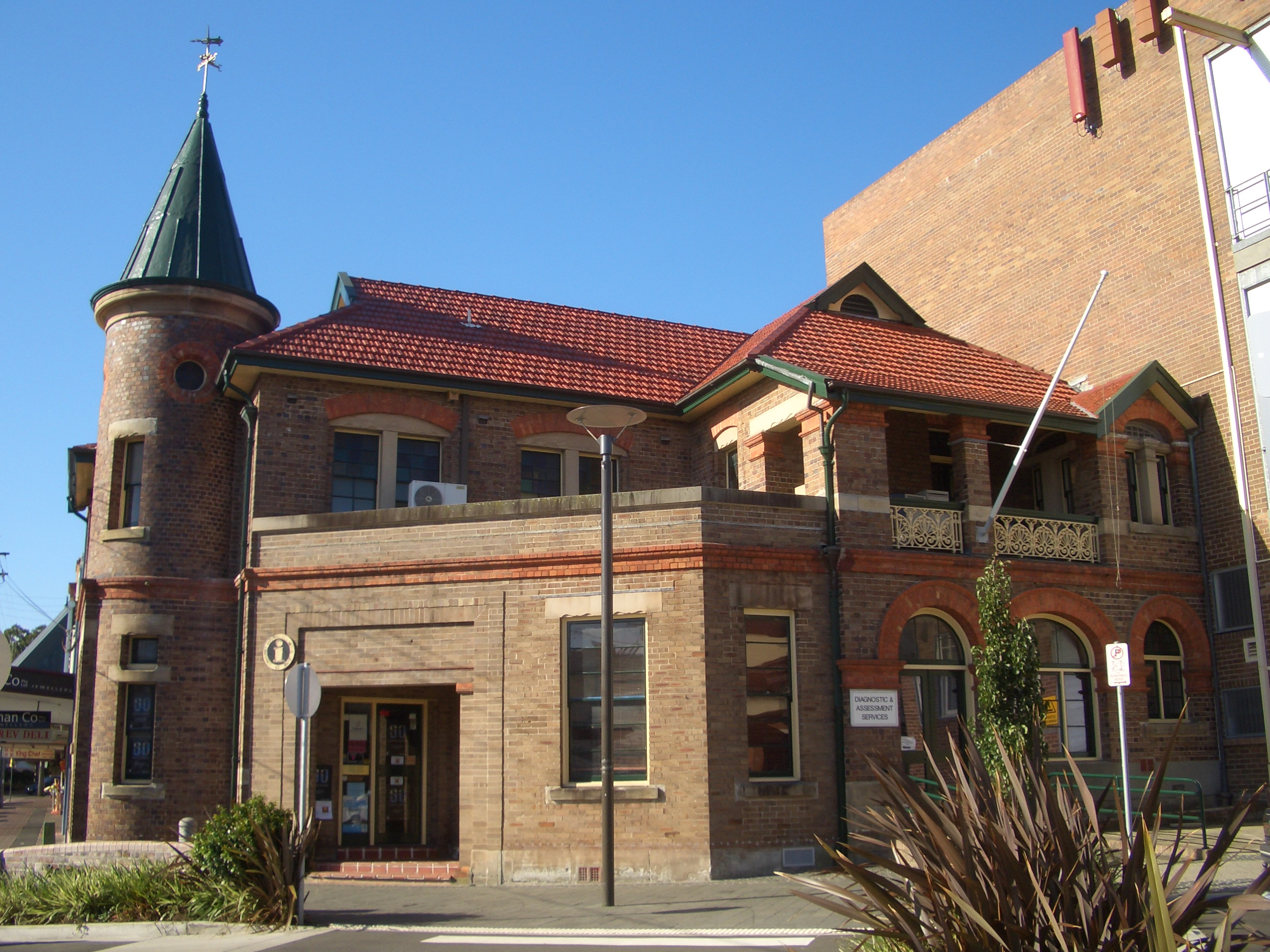
Kogarah Community Centre

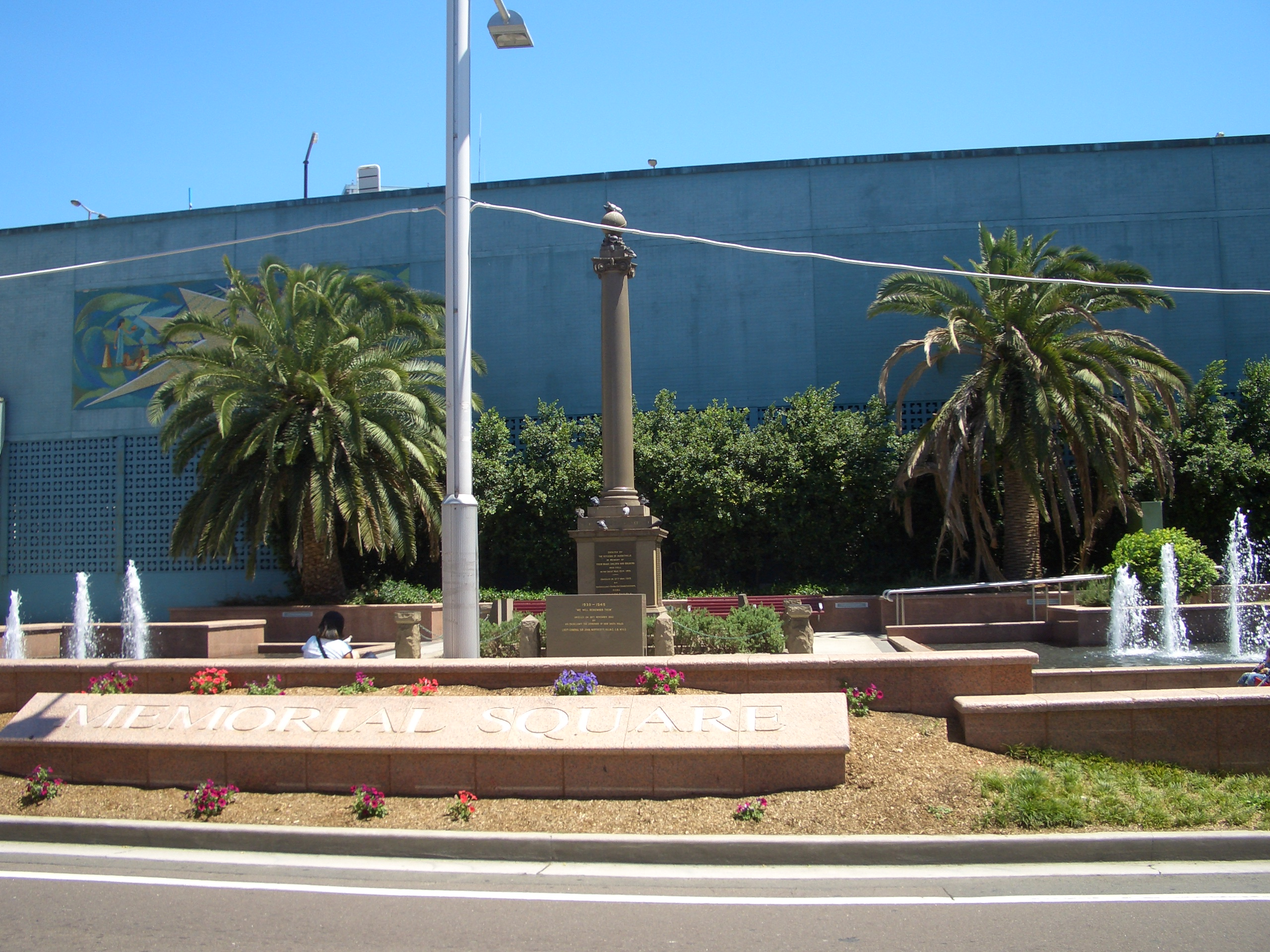
Memorial Square, Hurstville

James Cook sailed HMS Endeavour into Botany Bay in 1770 for his first landing on the continent of Australia. Captain Arthur Phillip led the First Fleet into the bay on 18 January 1788 to found a penal colony there but found the sandy infertile soil disappointing and moved the site of the settlement north to the natural harbour of Port Jackson. The ridge between the Cooks River and Georges River was covered in a dense forest which first attracted timber cutters to the area. Wood gatherers, bark collectors, sawyers and charcoal burners moved into the area to work the forests of Simeon Lord and supply Sydney's timber needs. By the 1840s, Major Mitchell was building the Illawarra Road (now Forest Road) on the ridge through ‘Lord’s Bush’, which required enormous amounts of trees and bush to be cleared. Irishman Michael Gannon was innkeeper at Cooks River in the 1840s. He acquired land in the area, part of which became known as ‘Gannons Forest’ which later was the centre of Hurstville. By 1851, it was estimated that 50 to 100 carts of timber and lime crossed the Cooks River daily.

St George Parish was one of the original parishes within Cumberland County. It is one of nine parishes named after saints, of which only St George and St James are still commonly used as place names. A map of the parish revealed that the land was cut into areas ranging from 30 to 500 acres (2.0 km^{2}) and a few large land grants of 2,000 acres (8.1 km^{2}). The recipients were William Packer, Josh Thorp, James Oatley, Hannah Laycock, F. W. Unwin, Reuben and David Hannam, Patrick Moore, J. Beehag, John Porter and the larger grants were James Chandler and John and Robert Townson. The parish also covers the former City of Canterbury, now the eastern part of the City of Canterbury-Bankstown, although most customary references to the "St George area" today do not include that part of the parish.

In 1920, the local councils in the St George area constituted St George County Council, to deal with distribution of electricity in the region. St George County Council was merged with Sydney County Council (another inter-council electricity supplier) to form "Sydney Electricity" in 1989.

The regional identity was reinforced by the creation in 1949 of a federal electorate, the Division of St George, in the area. The Division was abolished in 1993. The area's identity is reflected in the name of the St George Illawarra Dragons team who play in the National Rugby League, and the St. George Bank.

== Suburbs in St George Area ==
- Allawah
- Arncliffe
- Banksia
- Bardwell Park
- Bardwell Valley
- Bexley
- Bexley North
- Beverley Park
- Beverly Hills
- Blakehurst
- Brighton-Le-Sands
- Carlton
- Carss Park
- Connells Point
- Hurstville
- Hurstville Grove
- Kingsgrove
- Kogarah
- Kogarah Bay
- Kyeemagh
- Kyle Bay
- Lugarno
- Monterey
- Mortdale
- Narwee
- Oatley
- Peakhurst
- Peakhurst Heights
- Penshurst
- Ramsgate
- Ramsgate Beach
- Riverwood
- Rockdale
- Sandringham
- Sans Souci
- South Hurstville
- Turrella
- Wolli Creek

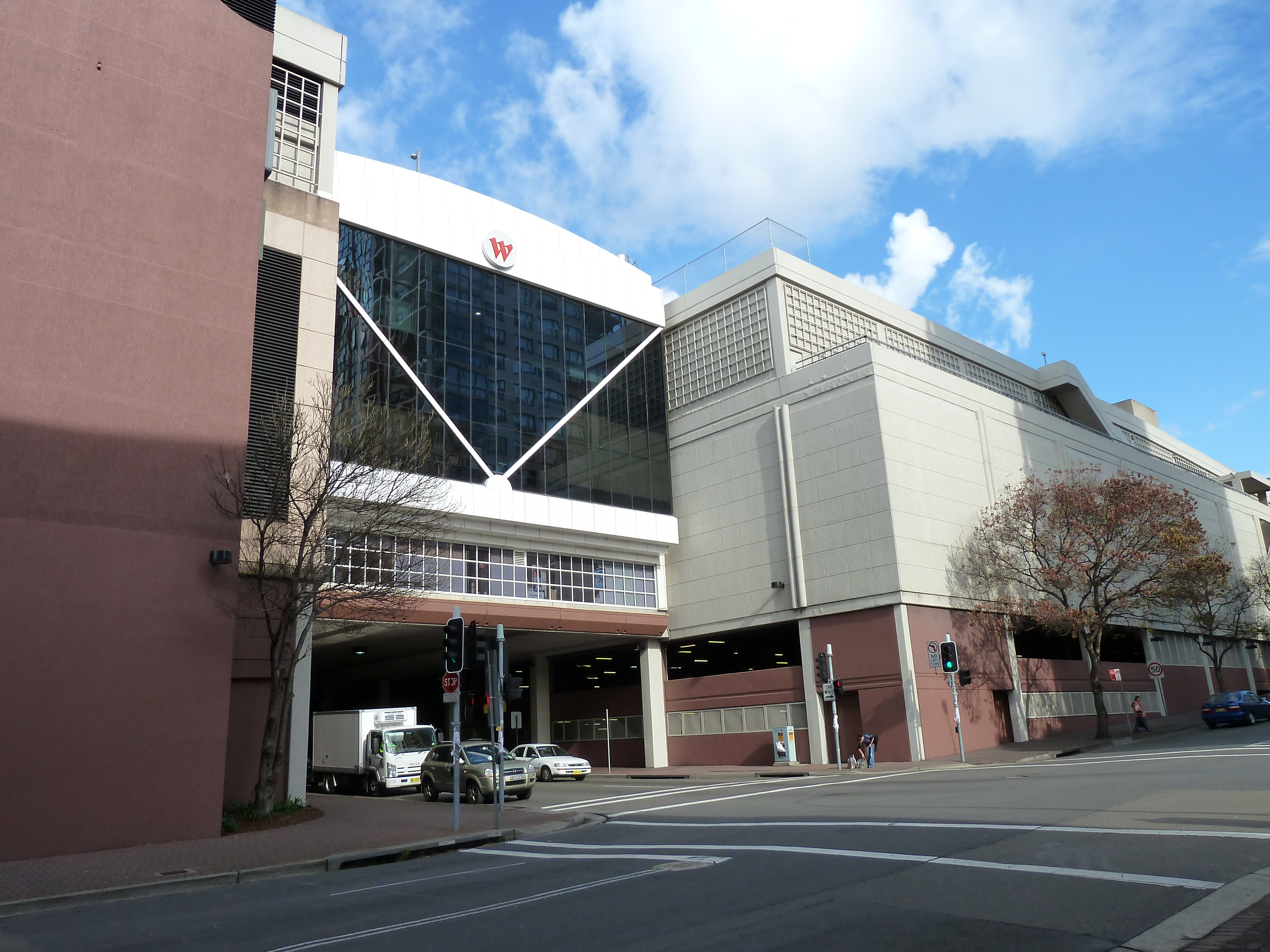
Westfield Hurstville

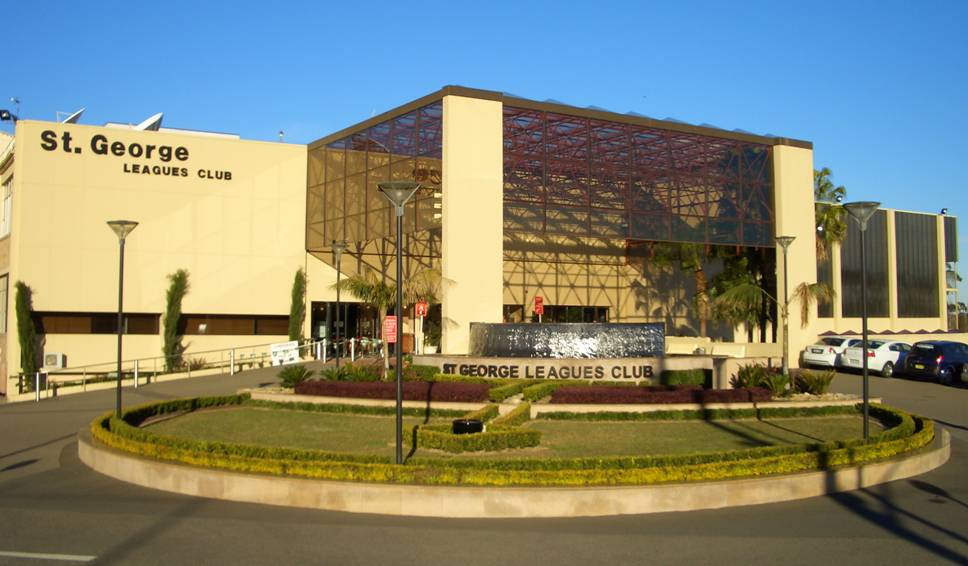
St George Leagues Club, Beverley Park

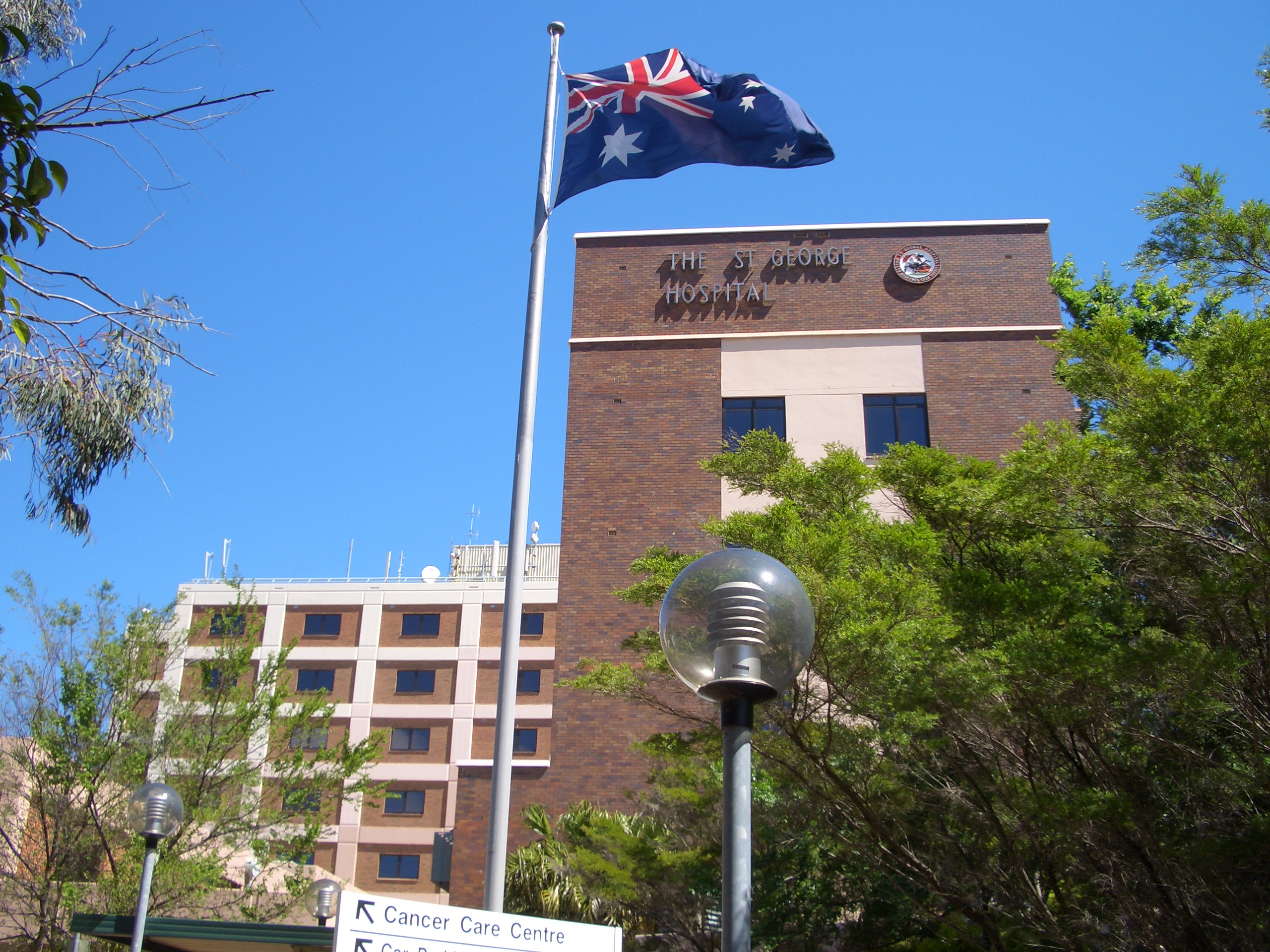
St George Hospital, Kogarah

== Culture and sport ==
The St George area is a culturally diverse region. The suburbs of Banksia, Bardwell Park, Kyeemagh and Brighton-Le-Sands have a substantial number of Southern European migrants. Hurstville has a substantial number of Asian migrants and their families.

In terms of sport, the area is known as the home of the St. George Illawarra Dragons and the St George District Cricket Club.

== Commercial areas ==
The biggest commercial areas in the St George area are located at Hurstville, Kogarah and Rockdale. Hurstville is the largest central business district in southern Sydney and features a large shopping centre called Westfield Hurstville. Additionally Rockdale features another large shopping centre, Rockdale Plaza.

== Transport ==
The St. George area is serviced very well by public transport. The Eastern Suburbs & Illawarra Line, South Coast Line and Airport Line have frequent services to the city directly or via Wolli Creek.

There are also abundant bus routes serving the region operated by Transit Systems and U-Go Mobility.

== Population ==
The population of the St George region, as estimated in 2020, was 285,214.

== St. George name ==
Several major local institutions have 'St. George' in their title:

- St. George Asian Business Association
- St. George Bank
- St. George Basketball Association
- St. George College, TAFE NSW Sydney Institute
- St. George & Sutherland Community College
- St George AFC
- St. George Dragons District Junior Rugby League
- St. George Girls High School
- St George Christian School
- St George Cricket Club
- St. George Hospital
- St. George Illawarra Dragons (NRL Rugby league Team)
  St. George Leagues Club
- St. George Masonic Club
- St George Model Boat Club
- St. George Motor Boat Club
- St George Rowing Club
- St. George Rugby Union Club
- St. George Sailing Club
- St. George Soccer Football Association
- St George and Sutherland Shire Leader newspaper
