= Georges River =

River in Sydney, New South Wales, Australia

Georges River Tucoerah River
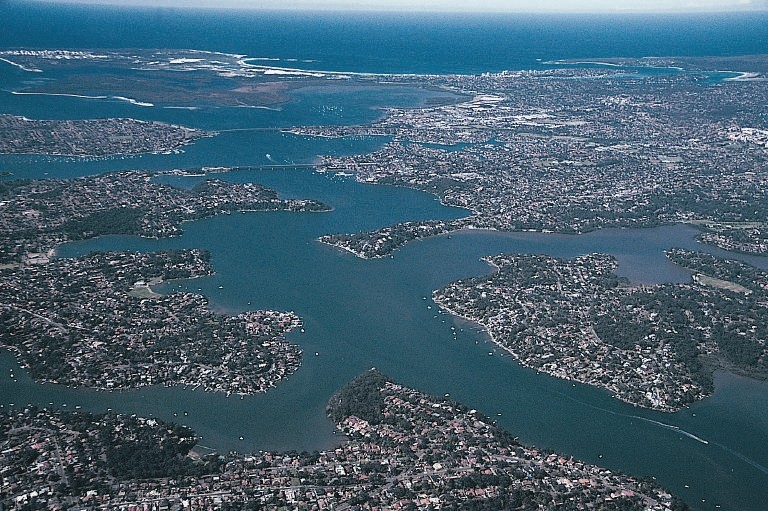
- Georges River, looking towards its mouth at Botany Bay, and out to the Tasman Sea.

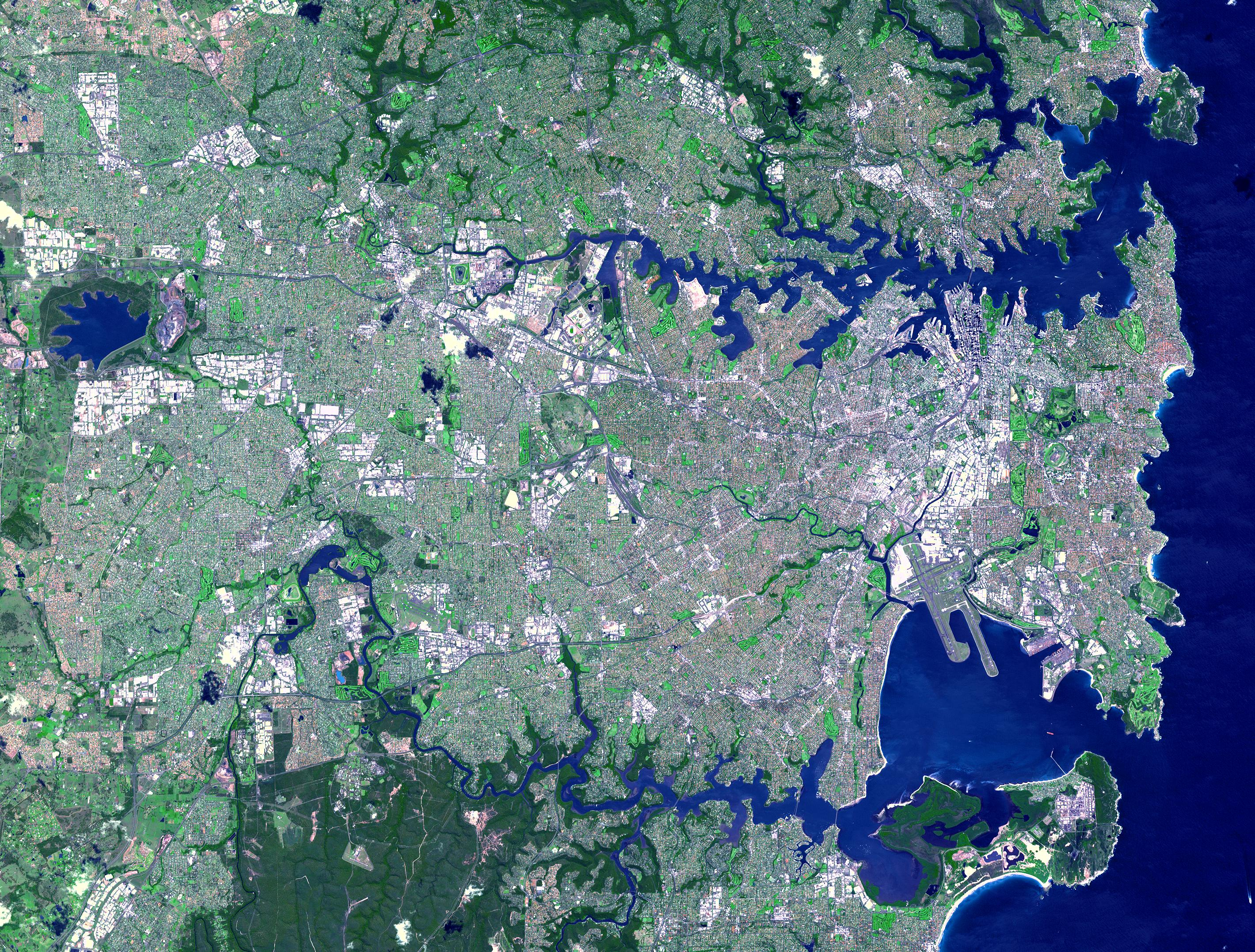
- NASA satellite view of Greater Metropolitan Sydney, with the location of the mouth of the Georges River, as marked
- Etymology: In honour of King George III

Location
- Country: Australia
- State: New South Wales
- Region: Greater Metropolitan Sydney
- LGAs: Bayside, Campbelltown, Canterbury-Bankstown, Fairfield, Georges River, Liverpool, Sutherland, Wollondilly

Physical characteristics
- Source: Upland swamps, O'Hares Creek
  - location: east of Appin in Macarthur
  - coordinates: 34°15′00″S 150°49′48″E
  - elevation: 350 m (1,150 ft)
- Mouth: Botany Bay
  - location: Taren Point/Sans Souci
  - coordinates: 34.0066940°S 151.1421598°E
- Length: 96 km (60 mi)
- Basin size: 930.9 km^{2} (359.4 sq mi)
- Depth
  - average: 5 m (16 ft)
  - maximum: 10 m (33 ft)

Basin features
- Tributaries
  - left: Bunbury Curran Creek, Cabramatta Creek, Lennox River (proposed), Prospect Creek, Salt Pan Creek, Boggywell Creek
- Lakes and reservoirs: Chipping Norton Lake

The Georges River, also known as Tucoerah River, is an intermediate tide-dominated drowned valley estuary, that is located in Sydney, Australia. The Georges River is located south and south-west from the Sydney central business district, with the mouth of the river being at Botany Bay.

The river travels for approximately 96 kilometres (60 mi) in a north and then easterly direction to its mouth at Botany Bay, about 5 kilometres (3.1 mi) from the Tasman Sea. The Georges River is the main tributary of Botany Bay; with the Cooks River being a secondary tributary. The total catchment area of the river is approximately 930.9 square kilometres (359.4 sq mi) and the area surrounding the river is managed by various local government authorities and Government of New South Wales agencies across Sydney. The land adjacent to the Georges River was occupied for many thousands of years by the Cabrogal of the Dharug nation. They used the river as an important source of food and a place for trade.

== Geography ==
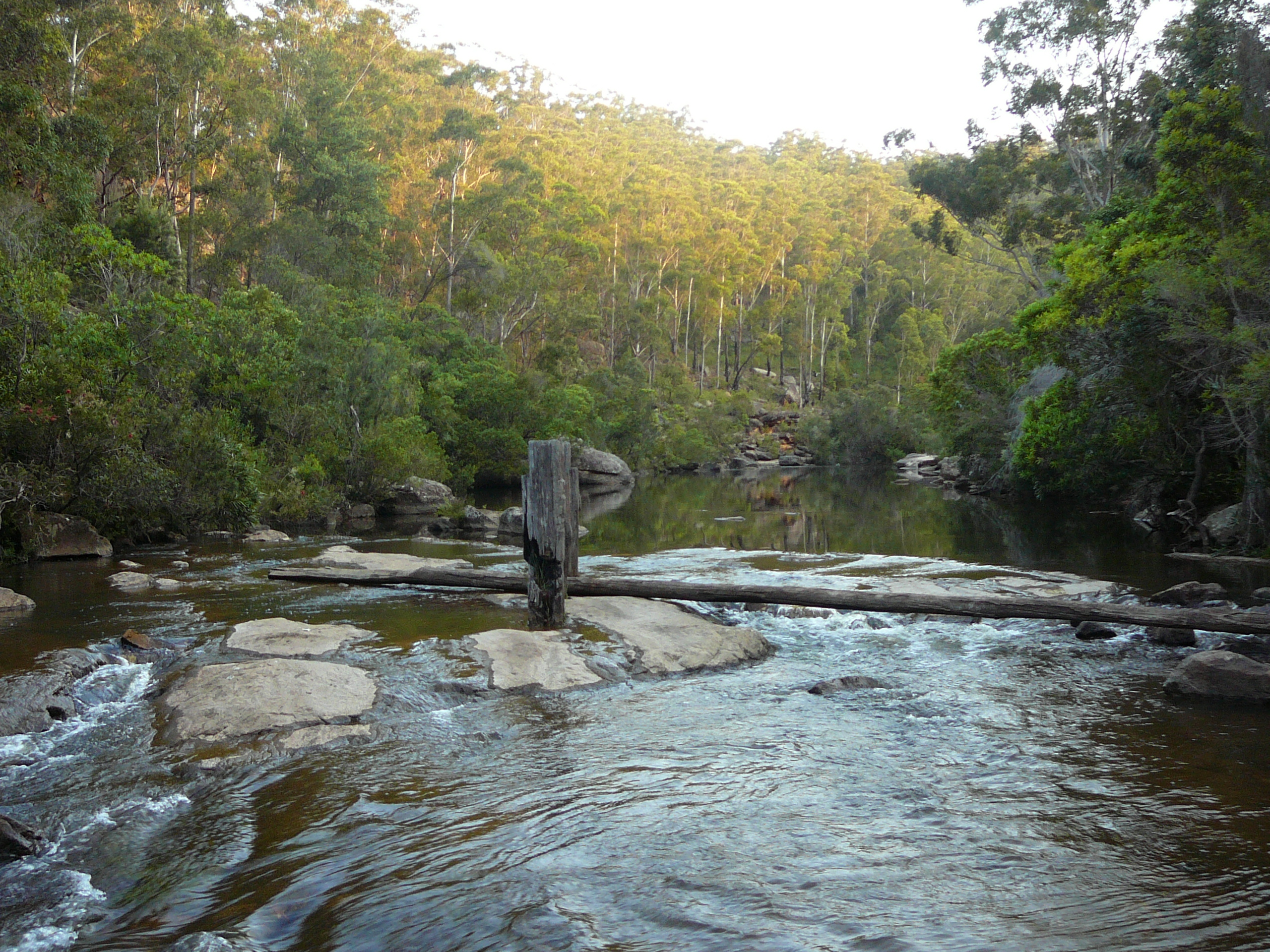
Freres Crossing, near Campbelltown.

From its source east of Appin within the heath habitat of the Wollondilly Shire and Wollongong Local Government Area, the Georges River flows north through rugged sandstone gorges to the east of Campbelltown, roughly parallel to the Main Southern railway line, with its eastern bank forming a boundary of Holsworthy Army Base. At Glenfield it reaches the urban environment and then travels to Liverpool where the river turns east and flows past the suburbs of East Hills, Lugarno, and Blakehurst, before emptying into Botany Bay at Taren Point/San Souci in the southern suburbs of Sydney, where it joins with the estuarine catchment.

Major tributaries include O'Hares Creek, Bunbury Curran Creek, Cabramatta Creek, Lennox River (proposed), Prospect Creek, Salt Pan Creek and the Woronora River. The Georges River is popular for recreational activities such as water skiing and swimming. The banks of the river along the lower reaches are marked by large inlets and indentations overlooked by steep sandstone ridges and scarps, many being home to expensive residential properties.

The Georges River features some artificial lakes in the suburb of Chipping Norton, near Liverpool. These lakes, known as the Chipping Norton Lake, are the result of sand mining and quarrying operations in the twentieth century. The Lakes are now a popular watersports and recreational facility for the residents of the south-western suburbs of Sydney.

Liverpool Weir now forms the uppermost tidal limit and presence of salt water on the Georges River.

From Appin to Glenfield, a large corridor has been protected as part of the Georges River Regional Open Space Corridor. Council reserves allow for access to natural sections of the river at Simmo's Beach, Ingleburn Reserve, Keith Longhurst Reserve, and Frere's Crossing.

Botany Bay Community River Health Monitoring Program is a community-based initiative to monitor ecosystem health catchment.

== History ==
=== Aboriginal history ===
Prior to the arrival of Europeans, Georges River was formerly known as Tucoerah (or Toggerai / Tuggerah) River by the traditional custodians of the area. It is not known whether this word referred to the whole river or rather just a part of it. Mill Creek, a tributary of Tucoerah was called Guragurang.

To the south of Tocoerah are the traditional lands of the Dharawal people. The Dharug/Eora people are the traditional custodians of the land on its northern banks.

=== European history ===
The Georges River was given its English name in honour of King George III, by Governor Arthur Phillip. It was one of the many sites of the Hawkesbury and Nepean Wars, a series of wars between the Kingdom of Great Britain and the resisting Indigenous clans in the late 1700s and early 1800s.

One of the earliest contacts between British settlers and Aboriginal people occurred on 20 January 1788. Arthur Phillip and Philip Gidley King, leading a party of seamen from the First Fleet rowing two open boats, explored the 'South-West Arm of Botany Bay' (now Georges River). They are now thought to have gone as far as Lime Kiln Bay, where they landed at two locations there, the first of which they called 'Lance Point'—thought to be modern-day Gertrude Point, Lugarno—where an altercation with local people occurred. Later the same day, there was a peaceful meeting at what is now thought to have been the head of Lime Kiln Bay. They are also now believed to have entered the estuarine mouth of the Georges Rivers' tributary, Woronora River. Not finding enough freshwater, around Botany Bay and its two 'arms', the colonists moved on to Port Jackson, where the settlement of Sydney began six days later.

The river was explored by Bass and Flinders in 1795 on their first voyage on the Tom Thumb after their arrival in New South Wales. The exploration led to the establishment of Bankstown.

A dam was constructed by David Lennox using convict labour at Liverpool in 1836, as a water supply to Liverpool.

Oyster farming on Georges River occurred between around 1870 and 2023, in the part of the river estuary downstream from Salt Pan Creek.

In February 2007, Liverpool and Campbelltown City Council were awarded a $2 million grant from the NSW Environmental Trust under their Urban Sustainability Initiative. The grant was to allow the councils, in conjunction with Wollondilly Shire Council and the Georges River Combined Councils Committee, to develop a Comprehensive Strategic Plan focused on the rehabilitation of the catchment area.

Since the 2010s, the Mandaean community in the Greater Sydney region has been using the Georges River for their ritual baptisms, called masbuta. Along with the Nepean River, it is one of the few ritual rivers (called yardna in Mandaic) that they use for their baptism and ablution rituals.

== Crossings ==
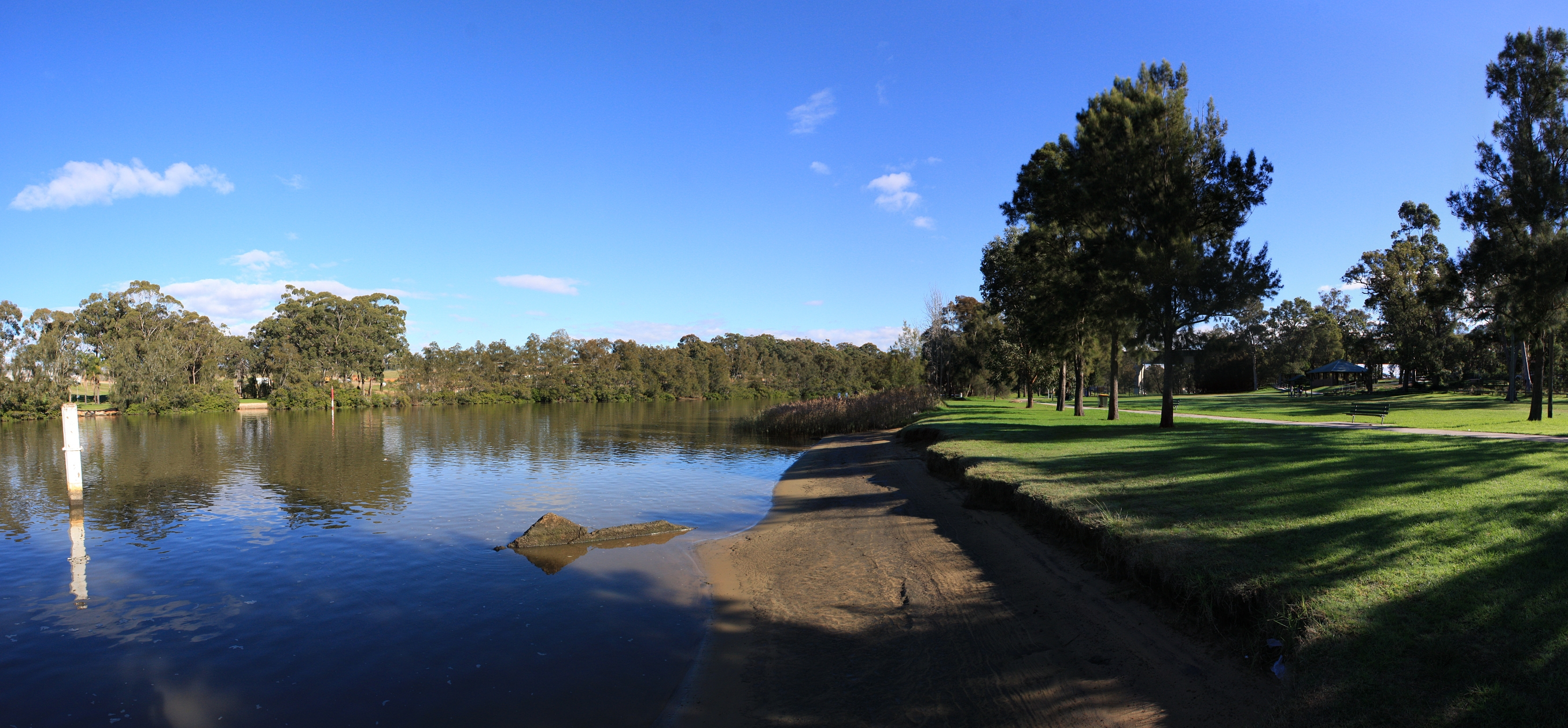
Georges River from East Hills.

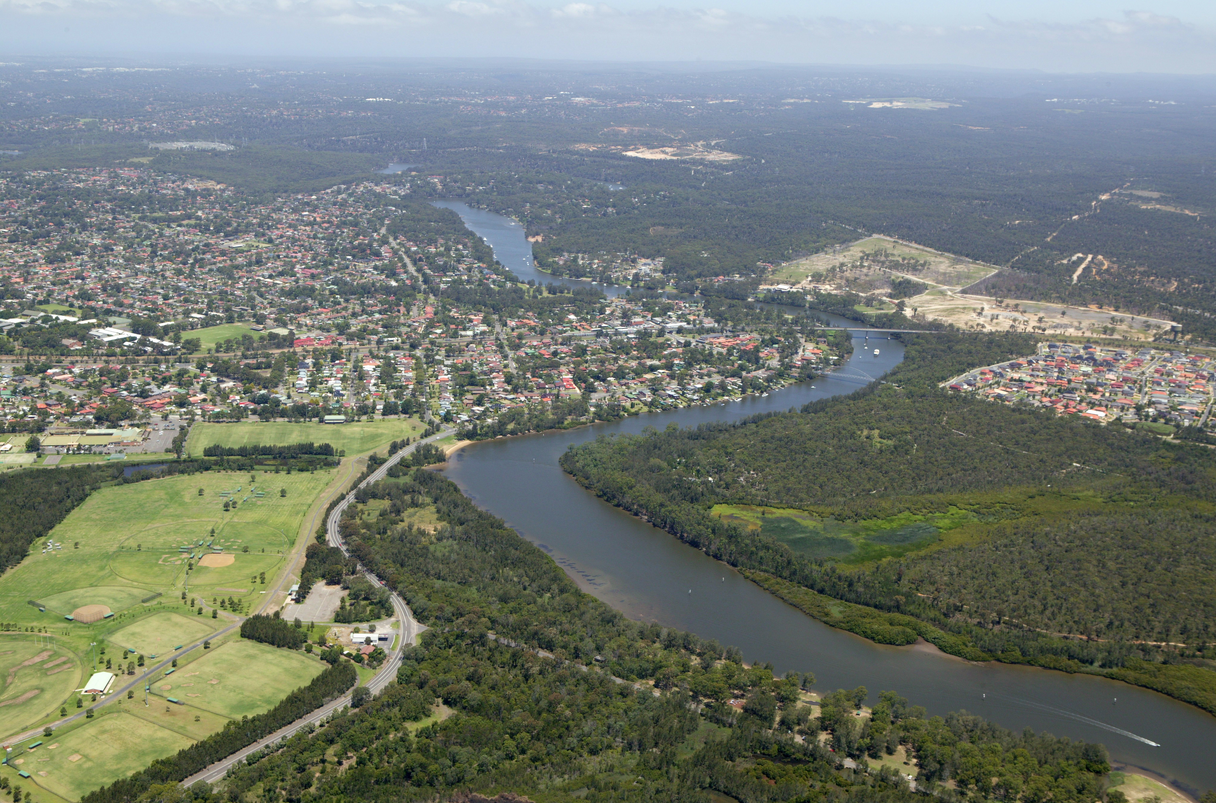
View of the river as it passes through East Hills and Voyager Point. The Voyager Point footbridge and the East Hills railway line bridge can be seen in the middle distance

Bridges over the Georges River include from east to west:

- Captain Cook Bridge (connecting Sans Souci to Taren Point), for cars, pedestrians and cyclists.
- Tom Uglys Bridge (connecting Blakehurst to Sylvania), carries Princes Highway.
- Old Como railway bridge, now for pedestrians and cyclists.
- Como railway bridge on the Illawarra line, connecting Oatley to Como, for trains.
- Alfords Point Bridge (connecting Padstow Heights to Alfords Point), for cars, pedestrians and cyclists.
- East Hills rail bridge at East Hills, for the East Hills railway line
- Voyager Point footbridge, for pedestrians and cyclists.
- M5 Motorway Georges River East Bridge
- Milperra Bridge (Newbridge Road connecting Moorebank to Milperra), for cars, pedestrians and cyclists.
- Governor Macquarie Drive bridge (connecting Warwick Farm to Chipping Norton), for cars, pedestrians and cyclists.
- Liverpool Weir – built 1836
- Liverpool footbridge (now demolished which utilised the footing of the decommissioned railway bridge to Holsworthy).
- Newbridge Road (connecting Liverpool to Chipping Norton), for cars, pedestrians and cyclists.
- M5 South Western Motorway Georges River West Bridge
- East Hills railway line bridge (connecting Holsworthy to Glenfield), for trains.
- Cambridge Avenue Causeway (connecting Holsworthy to Glenfield), for cars.
- King Falls Bridge

== Fish ==
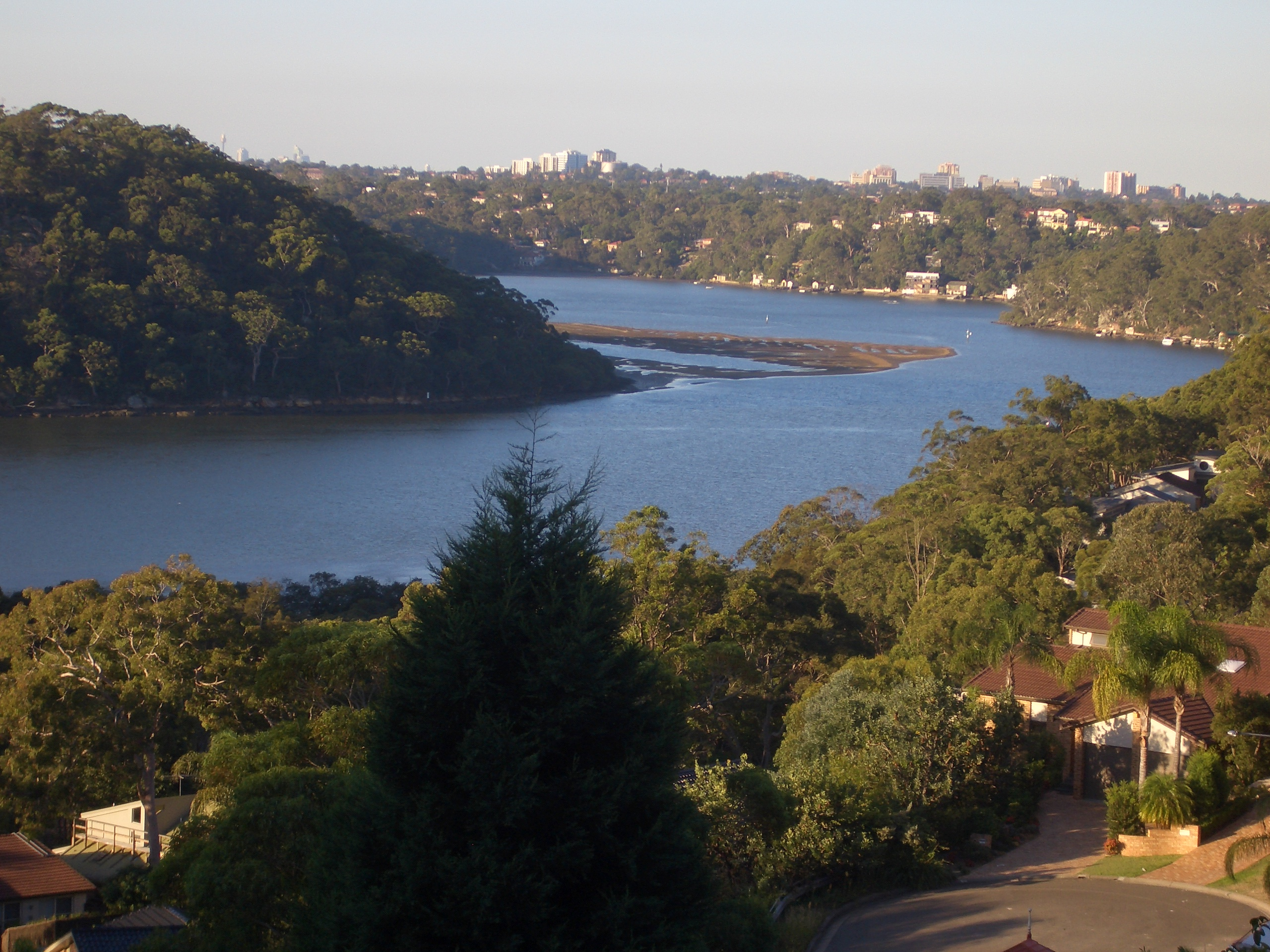
Georges River from Illawong.

The Georges River is a popular area for recreational fishing. Species present in the river include bass, bream, whiting, yellowtail, jewfish and flathead. The river was once host to a number of commercial oyster farms. The upper ends of the Georges River are abundant with Bass during the summer months and during the winter months these bass migrate down to the lower ends of the river towards the salt water to breed. Waste water inflows to the river are carefully managed to maintain the estuarine habitat.

== See also ==
- Dharawal National Park
- List of rivers in Australia
- List of rivers in New South Wales (A-K)
- Rivers of New South Wales
- Geography of Sydney
- Oyster farming on Georges River
