= Ray Wedgwood =

Australian civil and bridge engineer (1942-2020)

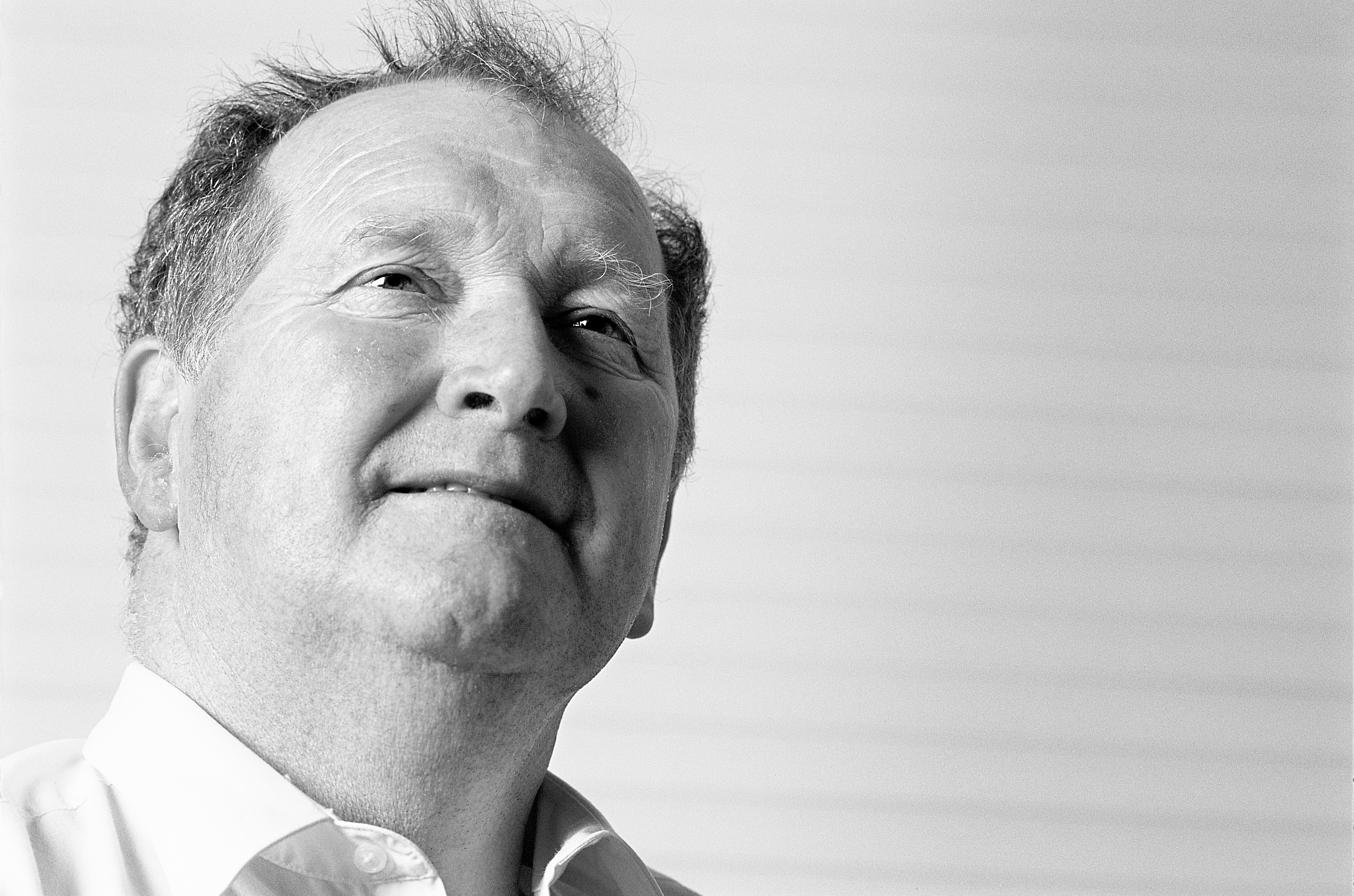
- Born: 27 May 1942; Dorrigo, New South Wales, Australia
- Died: 5 March 2020 (aged 77)
- Education: University of Sydney
- Engineering career
- Discipline: Civil, bridges
- Institutions: Engineers Australia
- Employer(s): Department of Main Roads; Roads & Traffic Authority
- Projects: Anzac Bridge; Macarthur Bridge; Captain Cook Bridge; M4 Viaduct Granville

Raymond John Lloyd Wedgwood (27 May 1942 – 5 March 2020) was an Australian engineer who served as the Chief Bridge Engineer of the Department of Main Roads and the Roads & Traffic Authority in New South Wales. He designed and supervised the construction of many major bridges across New South Wales and led the design team for the cable stayed Anzac Bridge in Sydney. He also played a pivotal role in the development of a common code of bridge design practice used by all Australian state road authorities.

== Early life ==
Wedgwood was born in Dorrigo, New South Wales, and grew up in nearby Bellingen. He was educated at Coffs Harbour High School and, on completing his secondary education, was awarded a cadetship by the Department of Main Roads (DMR) to attend the University of Sydney to study civil engineering.

== Career ==
After graduating with a Bachelor of Civil Engineering (Hons) degree in 1963 Wedgwood commenced employment in the DMR's Bridge Section in Sydney where his first bridge design involvement was for a curved reinforced concrete box section bridge over the F3 Motorway at Mount White. This bridge was one of the first curved structures designed by the authority. Soon after he was appointed as the Resident Engineer to supervise the construction of Captain Cook Bridge over the Georges River at Taren Point.

On completion of the Captain Cook Bridge he returned to the DMR bridge design section where he developed the design for a major composite steel and concrete box girder bridge on what was then the Hume Highway over the Nepean River at Camden, later to be known as Macarthur Bridge. This design adopted an innovative form of prestressing in which the continuous steel trapezoidal box girder sets would be set up with cambers of 60 inches at the center of the six-span set. After casting, the concrete deck would then be lowered by a controlled process to redistribute the stresses, matching the positive and negative bending moment capacities of the sections. Having completed the design Wedgwood was appointed as the Resident Engineer charged with supervision of the construction of the bridge.

In 1987, Wedgwood was appointed as the Chief Bridge Engineer of the DMR shortly before the department was merged with others to form the Roads & Traffic Authority. Wedgwood became the Chief Bridge Engineer of the new authority. It was a time when both the New South Wales and Federal governments were making major investments in road development. A series of projects aimed at duplicating the Hume Highway between Sydney and Melbourne were underway and a new proposal to duplicate the Pacific Highway from north of Newcastle to Brisbane was being developed. Together with major urban road development these initiatives saw record spending on roads and bridges and the need to develop designs for many major bridge structures.

In the late 1980s, Wedgwood was appointed as the New South Wales representative on the Austroads committee that was working to develop a new bridge design code to be used by all the Australian state road authorities. By the early 1990s Wedgwood had become the chair of that committee and in 1992 the new code was released. It was the first bridge design code in Australia to be based on limit state design. Continuing as the chair of the committee Wedgwood further developed the code to the point when it could be re-released as Australian Standard (AS 1500) for bridge design in 2004, at which time Austroads awarded Wedgwood the Austroads Medal for his work.

When the NSW Government charged the RTA with developing proposals to extend the Western Distributor freeway on the western approach to the Sydney CBD a solution needed to be found for a crossing of Blackwattle Bay at Glebe Island. The existing bridge at that location had been constructed in 1903, provided only four lanes of traffic and, as an opening swing span bridge, caused frequent stoppages in traffic. Regular use of the channel under the bridge by large cargo ships and the presence of underwater power supply cables prevented the new bridge from being a multi span structure.

After a suggestion made by Fritz Leonhardt on a visit to Sydney, Wedgwood and his design team chose a cable stayed design for the new long span bridge. The choice was controversial, with some critics claiming that the proposed solution was too grand and too expensive for the location. Despite the criticisms Wedgwood persisted with the proposal and eventually the NSW Government made a commitment to the project, with the construction company Baulderstone Hornibrook appointed as the builders. The bridge was opened to traffic on 3 December 1995 as the Glebe Island Bridge. It was later renamed Anzac Bridge on 11 November 1998.

In 1999, Wedgwood was appointed as the General Manager of Technical Services at the RTA responsible for delivering all aspects of road, bridge pavement and traffic engineering services to the organisation, a position he held until his retirement in 2004.

== Later life ==
After his retirement from the RTA in 2004 Wedgwood became an ex-officio member of the organisation's Heritage Committee and took an active role in developing improved methods of preserving heritage bridges. He also spoke publicly on matters of bridge history being a frequent guest on the Australia All Over radio program on ABC Radio.

Between 2008 and 2011, together with another former NSW Chief Bridge Engineer, Brian Pearson, he provided technical advice to the ACT Government about the heritage issues and structural refurbishment of the historic timber truss bridge over the Murrumbidgee River at Tharwa.

Between 2012 and 2018, he and Brian Pearson argued for the retention of the historic Windsor Bridge as a heritage structure when it was facing demolition as part of the bridge replacement program. The new bridge and approaches cut into Thompson Square in Windsor damaging what is widely regarded as an important feature of early colonial history.

He also contributed to several book on heritage bridge issues, notably Bridging Sydney, a history of the Sydney Harbour Bridge (2006), and The Timber Truss Bridge Book (2019).

Wedgwood died at Beverly Hills, Sydney on 5 March 2020. In July 2022 the New South Wales Government named the Morgan Rd overbridge at Mt White on the M1 Motorway in his honour, recognising his contribution to the transport industry and the community.

== Awards ==
- 1982 – Warren Medal, Institution of Engineers Australia
- 2004 – Austroads Medal, Austroads
