= Taren Point Road =

Road in New South Wales

Taren Point Road New South Wales
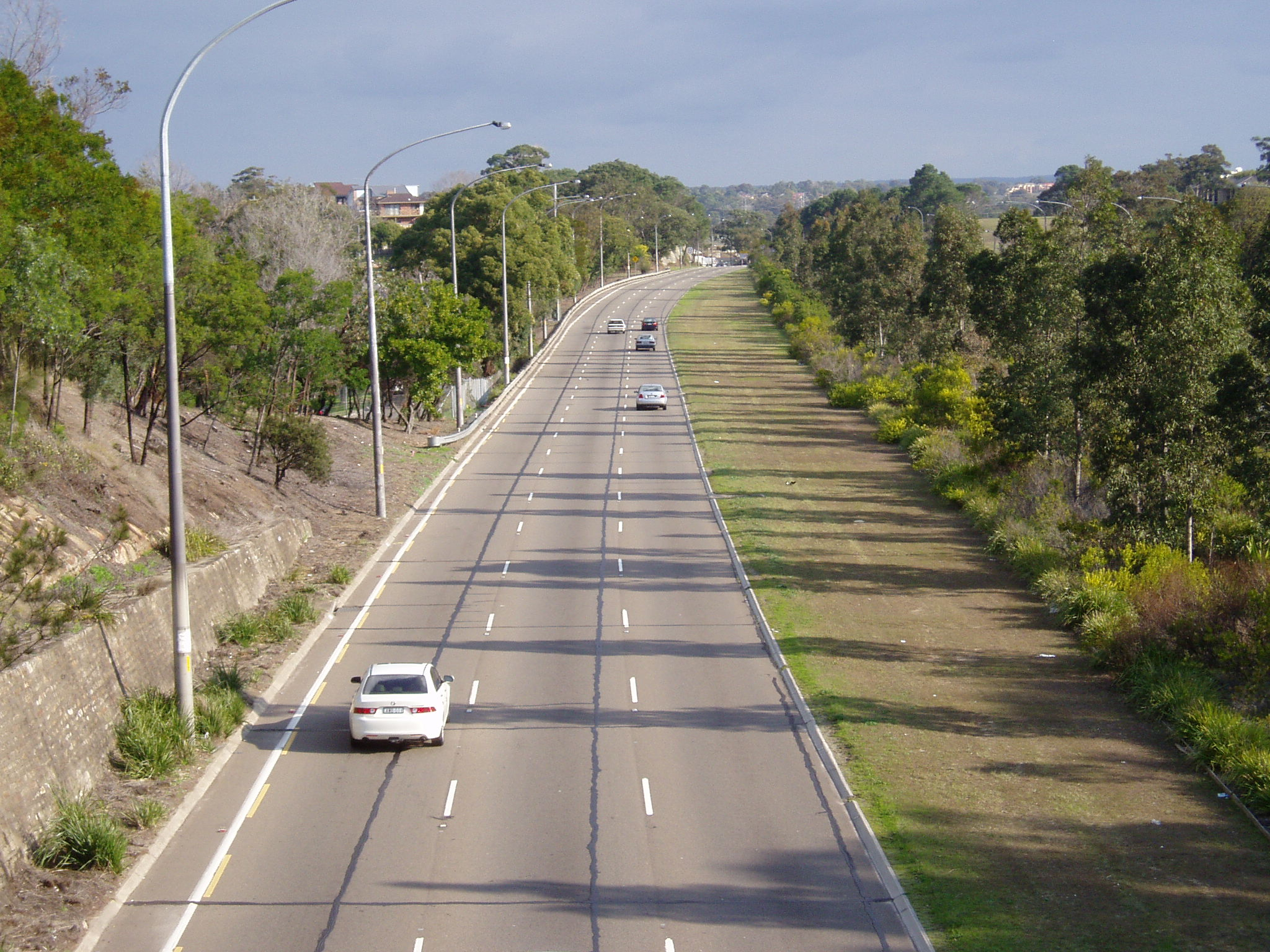
- Taren Point Road (southbound) looking towards Taren Point
- Coordinates: 34.010181°S 151.126728°E (North end); 34.039430°S 151.117213°E (South end)

General information
- Type: Road
- Length: 3.4 km (2.1 mi)
- Gazetted: August 1928
- Former route number: State Route 64 (1974–2004)

Major junctions
- North end: Rocky Point Road; Taren Point, Sydney
- Kingsway
- South end: Gardere Street; Caringbah, Sydney

Highway system
- Highways in Australia; National Highway • Freeways in Australia; Highways in New South Wales

Taren Point Road is a major road found in Taren Point and Caringbah, New South Wales, Australia.

== Route ==
Taren Point Road starts from Captain Cook Bridge, Taren Point and continues to Gardere Street, Caringbah. Traffic travelling north heads towards Sans Souci, and onwards to the city. Traffic travelling south heads towards Miranda or Cronulla.

Taren Point Road is three lanes in both directions. There are five traffic light intersections along the road. Transit Systems routes 477 and 478 use Taren Point Road. According to a newspaper report in February 2015, there are a total of 56,000 vehicular movements on Taren Point Road every day and the road delivers and accepts an estimated 30,600 vehicles from the Captain Cook Bridge.

Due to busy traffic during the peak periods, when speeds could be as low as 33 kilometres per hour (21 mph), upgrades were made on Taren Point Road at key pinchpoints in 2014. Further road changes were announced in 2018, along with extended clearways, in further attempts to reduce congestion.

== History ==
The passing of the Main Roads Act of 1924 through the Parliament of New South Wales provided for the declaration of Main Roads, roads partially funded by the State government through the Main Roads Board (MRB). Main Road No. 199 was declared along this route on 8 August 1928, from the ferry at Taren Point, along Taren Road, to the intersection with Kingsway at Caringbah (and continuing northwards via the Taren Point ferry along Rocky Point Road to the intersection with Princes Highway, and southwards along Kingsway to Cronulla); with the passing of the Main Roads (Amendment) Act of 1929 to provide for additional declarations of State Highways and Trunk Roads, this was amended to Main Road 199 on 8 April 1929.

Taren Road was officially renamed Taren Point Road, between Taren Point and Kingsway in Caringbah, on 27 October 1948. Main Road 199 was re-aligned to use the Captain Cook Bridge (replacing the old ferry service), and its southern end was truncated to the intersection of Taren Point Road and Kingsway, on 22 February 1967.

The passing of the Roads Act of 1993 updated road classifications and the way they could be declared within New South Wales. Under this act, Taren Point Road retains its declaration as part of Main Road 199.

The route was allocated part of State Route 64 in 1974, but was decommissioned in 2004.

=== F6 Freeway extension ===
Taren Point Road was to be a joining section of a long-proposed northern extension of F6 Freeway (today Princes Motorway) closer to the city. Of the proposed extension, only the six-lane Captain Cook Bridge and a short connecting section of Taren Point Road to the south have been built. Establishment of the bridge section of the F6 extension began in 1962, expedited to replace the ferry service that had operated from Taren Point to Sans Souci since 1916, with Captain Cook Bridge opening in May 1965. The F6 extension project was revived in the mid-2010s, and will now become a future stage of the M6 Motorway.

== Major intersections ==
Taren Point Road is entirely contained within the Sutherland Shire local government area.

Location	km	mi	Destinations	Notes
Taren Point	0.0	0.0	Rocky Point Road – Sans Souci, Kogarah	Northern terminus of road Continues north over Captain Cook Bridge as Rocky Point Road
Caringbah	1.9	1.2	Parraweena Road – Miranda, Caringbah	
Caringbah	2.5	1.6	The Boulevarde (west) – Kirrawee, Miranda; Captain Cook Drive (east) – Cronulla, Kurnell	
Caringbah	3.2	2.0	Kingsway – Gymea, Cronulla	
Caringbah	3.4	2.1	Hinkler Avenue – Caringbah	
Caringbah	3.4	2.1	Gardere Street – Caringbah	Southern terminus of road
Route transition
