= Sandringham, New South Wales =

Sandringham
- Suburb
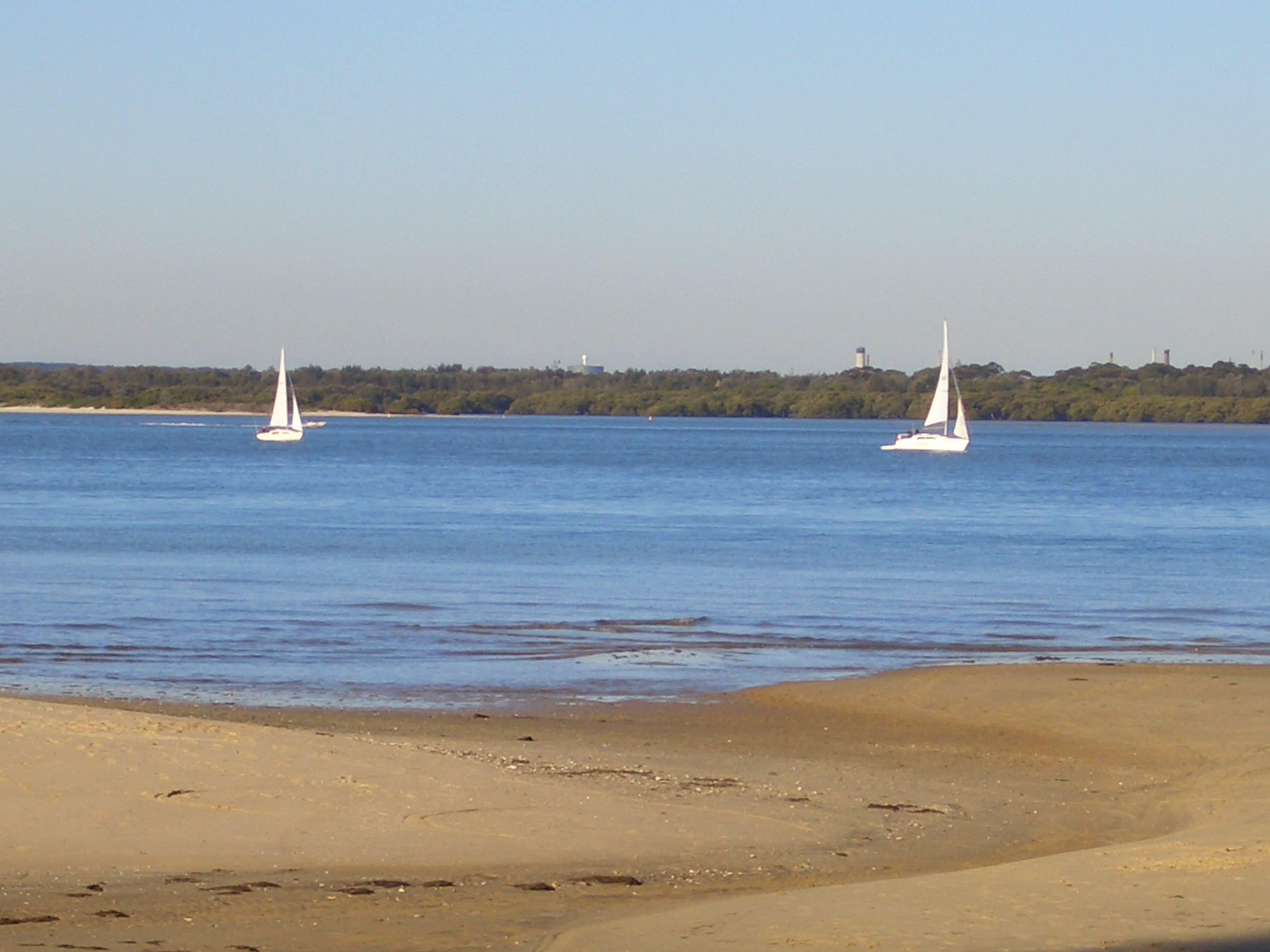
- Georges River, Sandringham

- Interactive map of Sandringham
- Country: Australia
- State: New South Wales
- City: Sydney
- LGA: Bayside Council
- Location: 18 km (11 mi) south of Sydney CBD

Government
  - State electorate: Rockdale
  - Federal division: Cook

Population
  - Total: 1,275 (2021 census)
- Postcode: 2219
Suburbs around Sandringham
Sans Souci	Dolls Point
Sans Souci	Sandringham	Botany Bay
Sans Souci	Taren Point	Kurnell

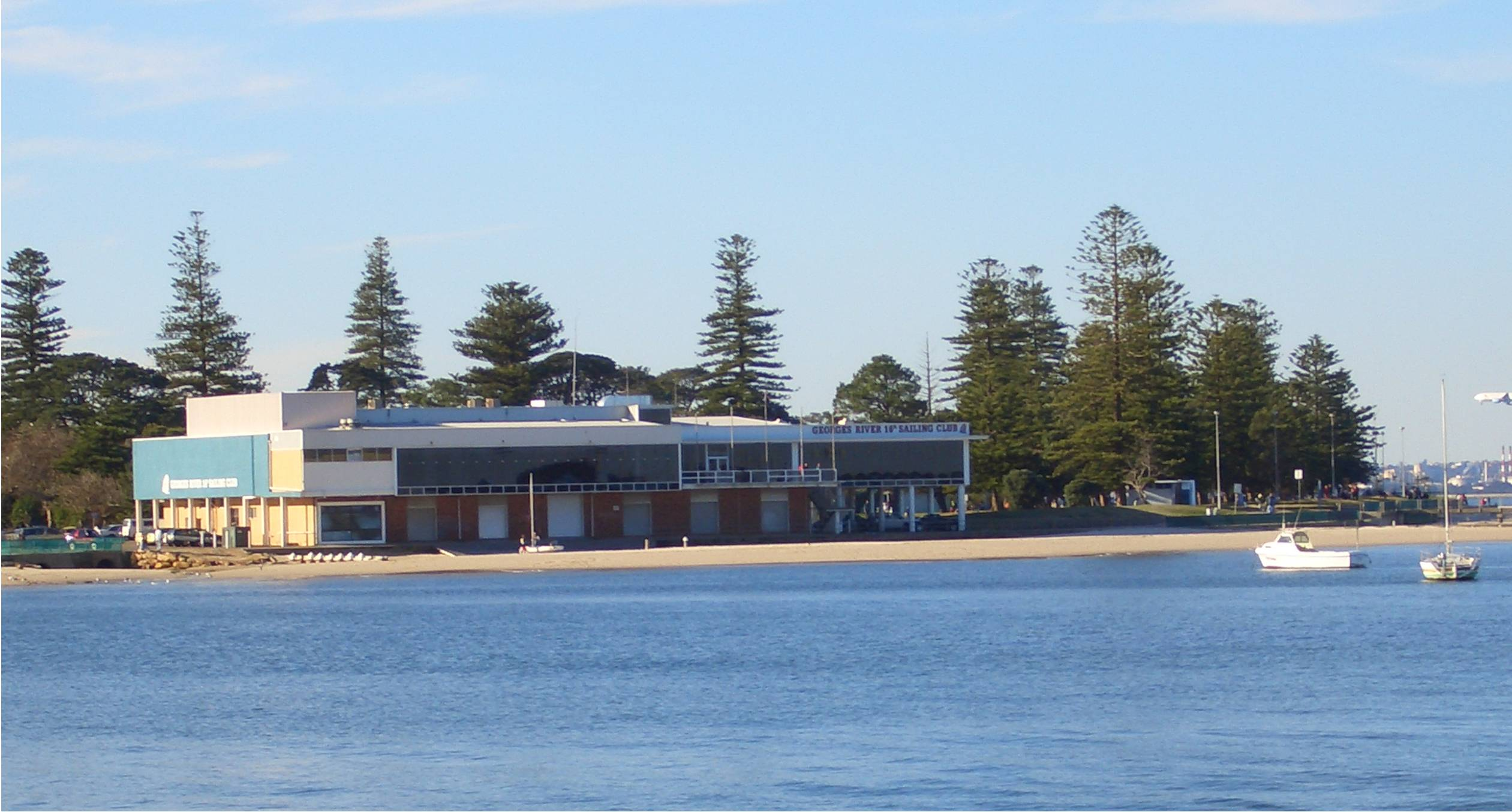
Georges River Sailing Club

Sandringham is a suburb in southern Sydney, in the state of New South Wales, Australia. Sandringham is located 18 kilometres south of the Sydney central business district and is part of the St George area. Sandringham is in the local government area of the Bayside Council.

Sandringham is a quiet residential suburb on the western shore of Botany Bay, at the mouth of the Georges River. Cook Park runs along the eastern and southern border and the beach stretches from Dolls Point to Sandringham Bay. The Georges River Sailing Club sits on the foreshore. A small group of shops is located at the intersection of Clareville Avenue and Russell Avenue, on the border with Sans Souci and Sandringham.

== History ==
Sandringham was originally known as Strippers Point in the 1830s, from the local occupation of tree-felling and bark-stripping. William Rust, bought a grand house on Rocky Point Road at Sans Souci from Thomas Holt (1811–88), which he turned into a luxurious hotel. Later, he moved to Strippers Point renamed it Sandringham and built the Prince of Wales Hotel. As an ardent royalist, it is thought he chose the name to honour Edward VII, the Prince of Wales who in 1872 was also building a royal residence at Sandringham, in Norfolk, England.

The area between Cooks River and Georges River was originally known as Seven Mile Beach. It was changed to Lady Robinson's Beach in 1874 to honour the wife of Governor Sir Hercules Robinson. Cook Park is named after Samuel Cook who advocated for public pleasure.

== Landmarks ==
- Sandringham Bay, Sandringham Baths
- Cook Park, Clareville Reserve, Stan Moses Reserve, Scott Park, Peter Depena Reserve
- Georges River Reserve

== Demographics ==
According to the 2021 census of Population, there were 1,275 people usually resident in Sandringham. 33.6% stated they were born overseas with the top countries of birth being Greece 4.5%, China 2.1%, Egypt 1.7%, North Macedonia 1.6% and England 1.5%. English was stated as the only language spoken at home by 60.5% of residents and the most common other languages spoken were Greek 13.6%, Arabic 5.0%, Macedonian 2.8%, Mandarin 2.1% and Cantonese 1.7%. The most common responses for religious affiliation were Eastern Orthodox Church 26.1%, Catholic 21.6%, No Religion 15.5% and Anglican 11.3%.

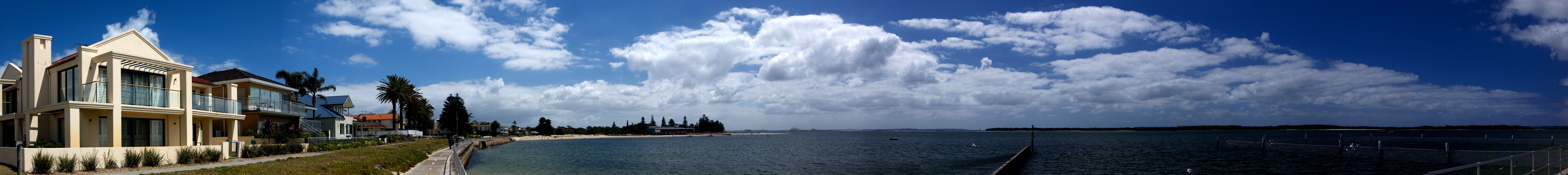
Sandringham Panorama
