= ARRB =

ARRB may refer to:

- Australian Road Research Board, a research organisation studying Australia's roads
- Assassination Records Review Board
