= Caringbah =

- Suburb
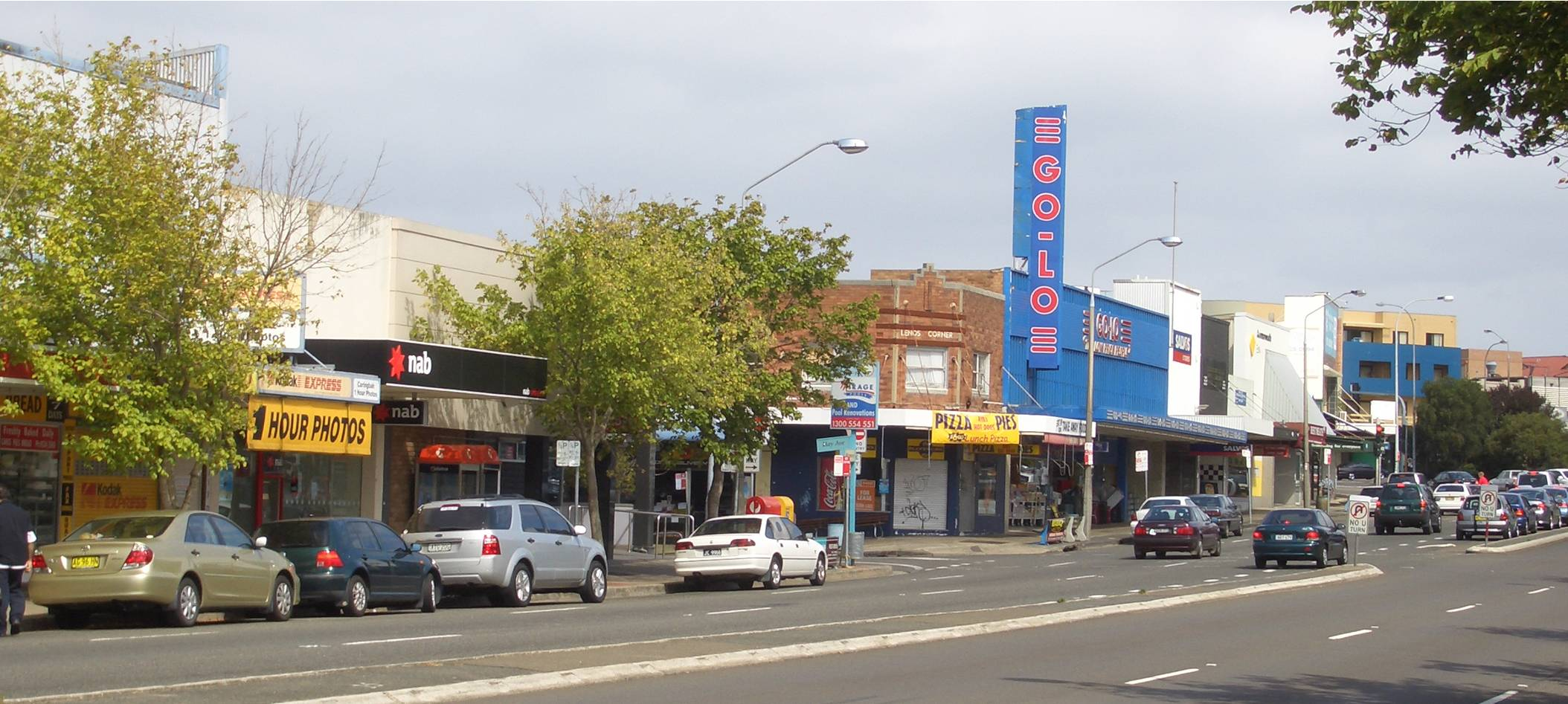
- Kingsway, Caringbah

- Interactive map of Caringbah
- Country: Australia
- State: New South Wales
- City: Sydney
- LGA: Sutherland Shire
- Location: 24 km (15 mi) south of Sydney CBD

Government
  - State electorates: Cronulla; Miranda
  - Federal division: Cook
- Elevation: 39 m (128 ft)

Population
  - Total: 12,575 (2021 census)
- Postcode: 2229
Suburbs around Caringbah
Sylvania Waters	Taren Point	Woolooware
Miranda	Caringbah	Dolans Bay, Port Hacking
Yowie Bay	Caringbah South	Lilli Pilli

Caringbah is a suburb in Southern Sydney, in the state of New South Wales, Australia. Caringbah is 24 kilometres (15 mi) south of the Sydney central business district in the local government area of Sutherland Shire.

Caringbah once stretched from Woolooware Bay on the Georges River to Yowie Bay and Burraneer Bay on the Port Hacking estuary. A number of Caringbah localities have been declared as separate suburbs but still share the postcode 2229. These suburbs include Taren Point to the north on the Georges River, and Port Hacking, Lilli Pilli, Dolans Bay and Caringbah South, located on the Port Hacking River to the south.

== History ==
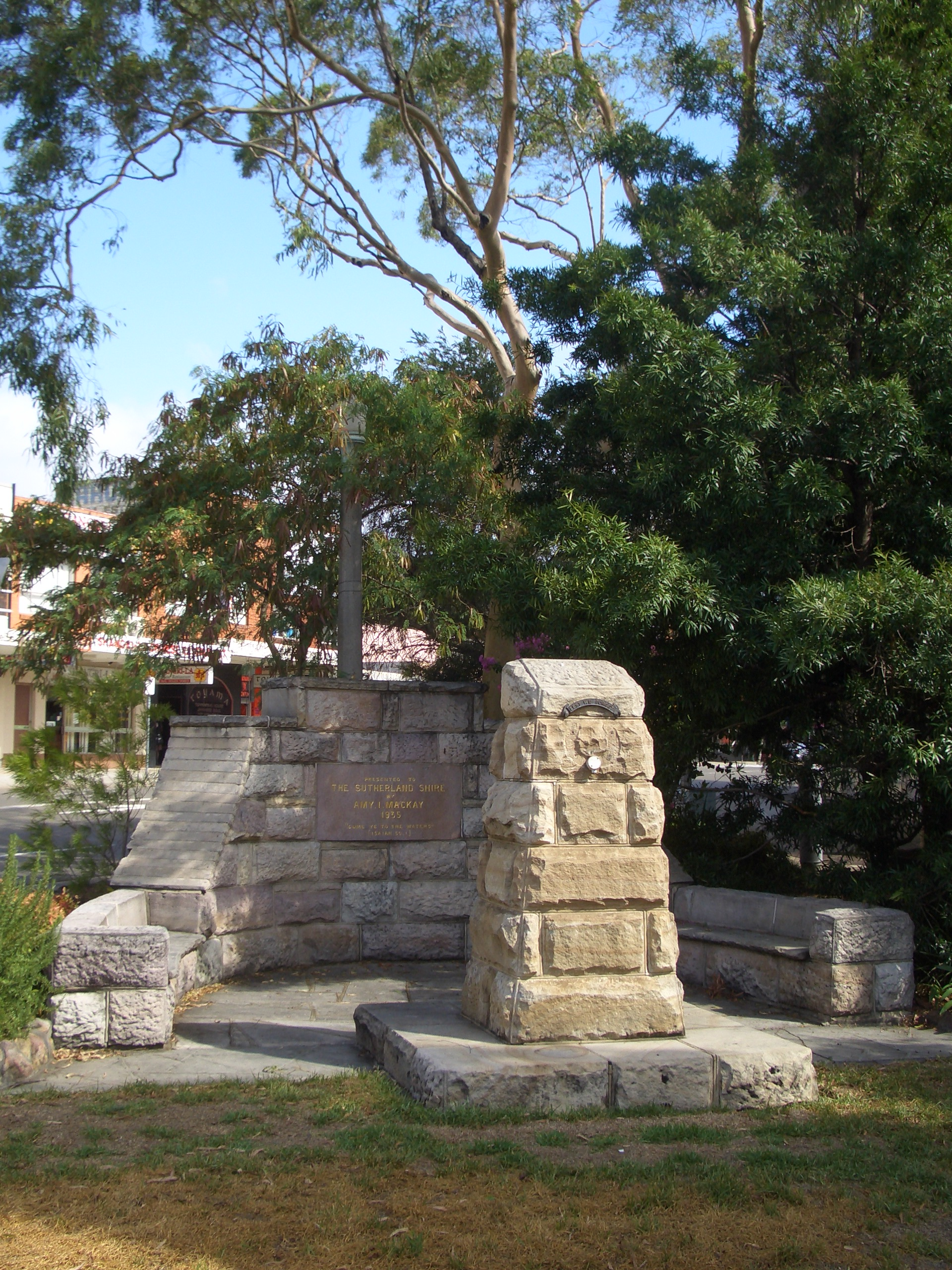
Caringbah memorial

Caringbah is an Aboriginal word from the Kumbainggar language for a pademelon wallaby. The suburb was originally called Highfield, but it is unclear whether this was a position description or whether it was named after an early resident. Caringbah was used from 1911, after the steam trams began operating between Cronulla and Sutherland.

Thomas Holt (1811–88) owned most of the land that stretched from Sutherland to Cronulla in the 1860s. Most of the area around Miranda and Caringbah was used for market gardening from the 1880s. Caringbah was still used for orchards and farming until after World War II. The railway line to Cronulla opened in 1939.

== Commercial area ==
Caringbah features a mixture of residential, commercial and industrial areas. The commercial district is made up mostly of small businesses specialising in professional services. A large commercial and industrial area is also centred on Taren Point Road and surrounding areas. Commercial developments here include many home furnishing retailers such as Nick Scali Furniture, large retailers including Bunnings, as well as home renovation showrooms.

The main shopping centre is located close to Caringbah railway station and is centred on the intersections of President Avenue, The Kingsway and Port Hacking Road South. A small group of shops, known as Caringbah South, is located further south on Port Hacking Road South. Caringbah Library is located on Port Hacking Road South. Another small group of shops is located even further south, close to the border of Lilli Pilli. Caringbah is home to the public district Sutherland Hospital adjacent to Caringbah Ambulance Station and Kareena Private Hospital on Kareena Road.

== Transport ==
Caringbah is a central suburb of the Sutherland Shire, considering some of the main roads intersect here. President Avenue and The Kingsway both run from Sutherland via Miranda in the west, to the popular beachside suburb of Cronulla in the east. Taren Point Road leads north to the Captain Cook Bridge, St George area and further north to the Sydney CBD.

Caringbah railway station is on the Cronulla branch of the Eastern Suburbs & Illawarra Line T4 on the Sydney Trains network.

U-Go Mobility runs buses to Lilli Pilli, South Cronulla, Hurstville, Sutherland, Cronulla and Dolans Bay.

== Demographics ==
According to the 2021 census of Population, there were 12,575 people in Caringbah.

- Aboriginal and Torres Strait Islander people made up 1.6% of the population.
- 74.3% of people there were born in Australia. The next most common countries of birth were England 3.8%, New Zealand 2.0%, China 1.8%, Philippines 1.0% and India 0.8%.
- 80.5% of people spoke only English at home. Other languages spoken at home included Mandarin 2.0%, Greek 1.3%, Russian 1.1%, Spanish 1.1% and Cantonese 1.0%.
- The most common responses for religion were No Religion 36.7%, Catholic 27.2% and Anglican 14.2%.

== Schools ==
There are three secondary schools and several primary schools in Caringbah.

- Caringbah Selective High School, the only academically selective secondary school in the Sutherland Shire.
- Endeavour Sports High School, one of seven selective sports secondary schools in NSW offering Targeted Sports Programs for talented athletes.
- De La Salle Catholic College Caringbah, 7-12 single-sex secondary school for young men
- Our Lady of Fatima Catholic Primary School
- Caringbah Public School (located in Caringbah South)
- Caringbah North Public School, which fields an opportunity class for students in year's 5&6
- Laguna Street Public School
- Lilli Pilli Public School

== Sport ==
Caringbah is host to several sporting teams, including:

- De La Salle Caringbah - (Rugby League)
- Cronulla‑Caringbah Sharks JRLFC - (Rugby League)
- Caringbah Sports Cricket Club - (Cricket)
- Caringbah Redbacks FC - (Soccer/Football)
- Lilli Pilli FC - (Soccer/Football)

== Gallery ==
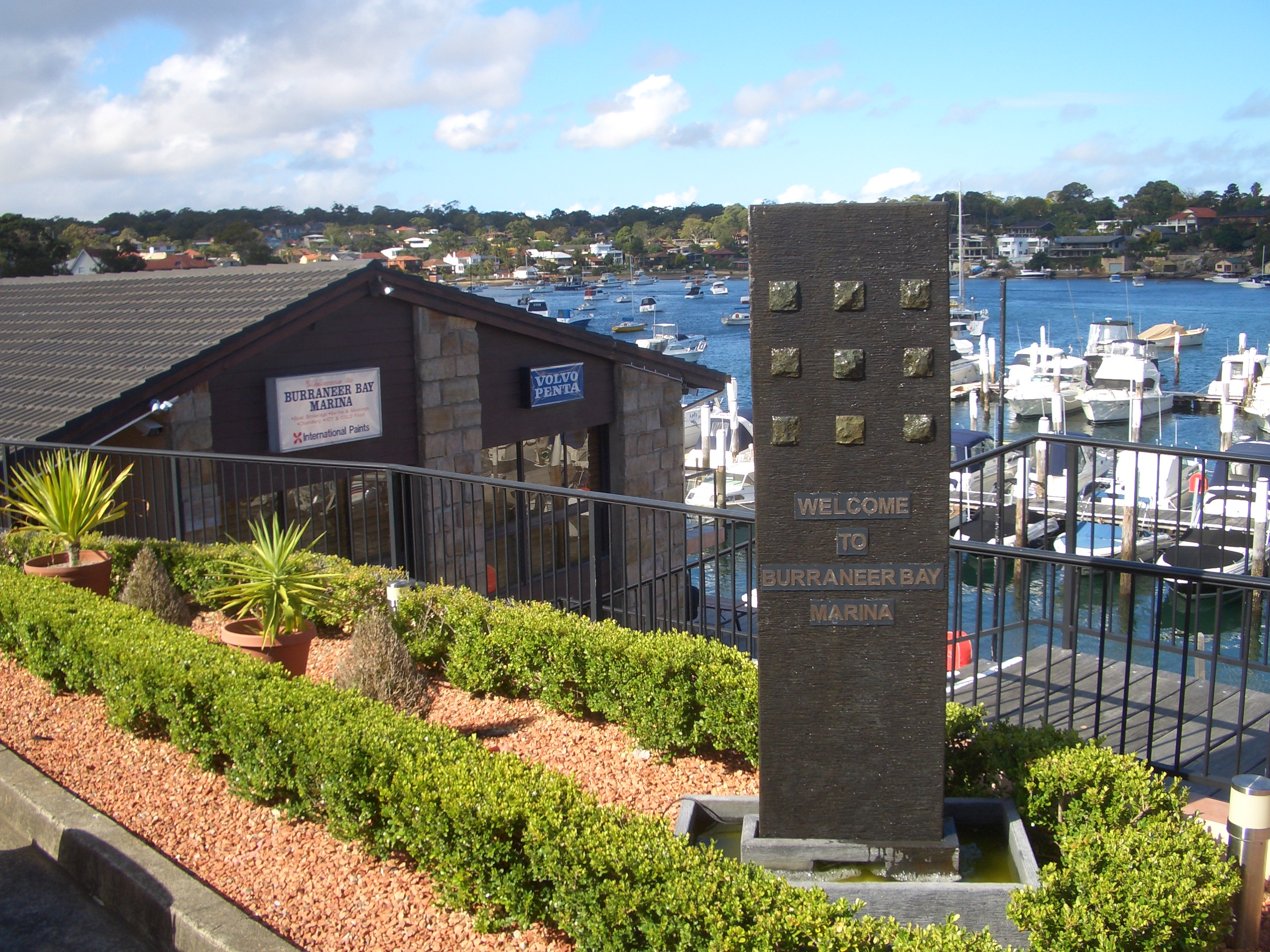
Burraneer Bay Marina (#1)

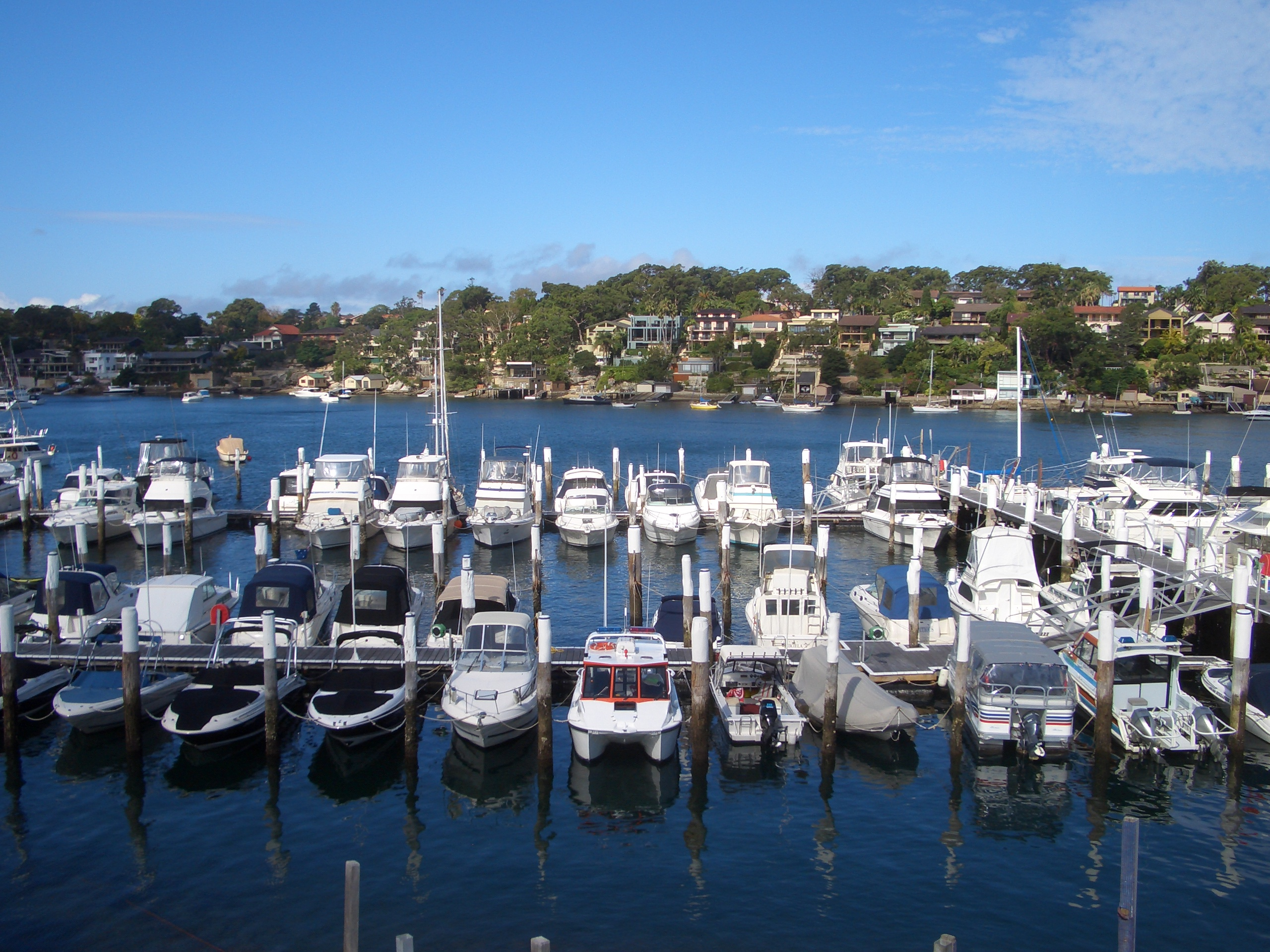
Burraneer Bay Marina (#2)

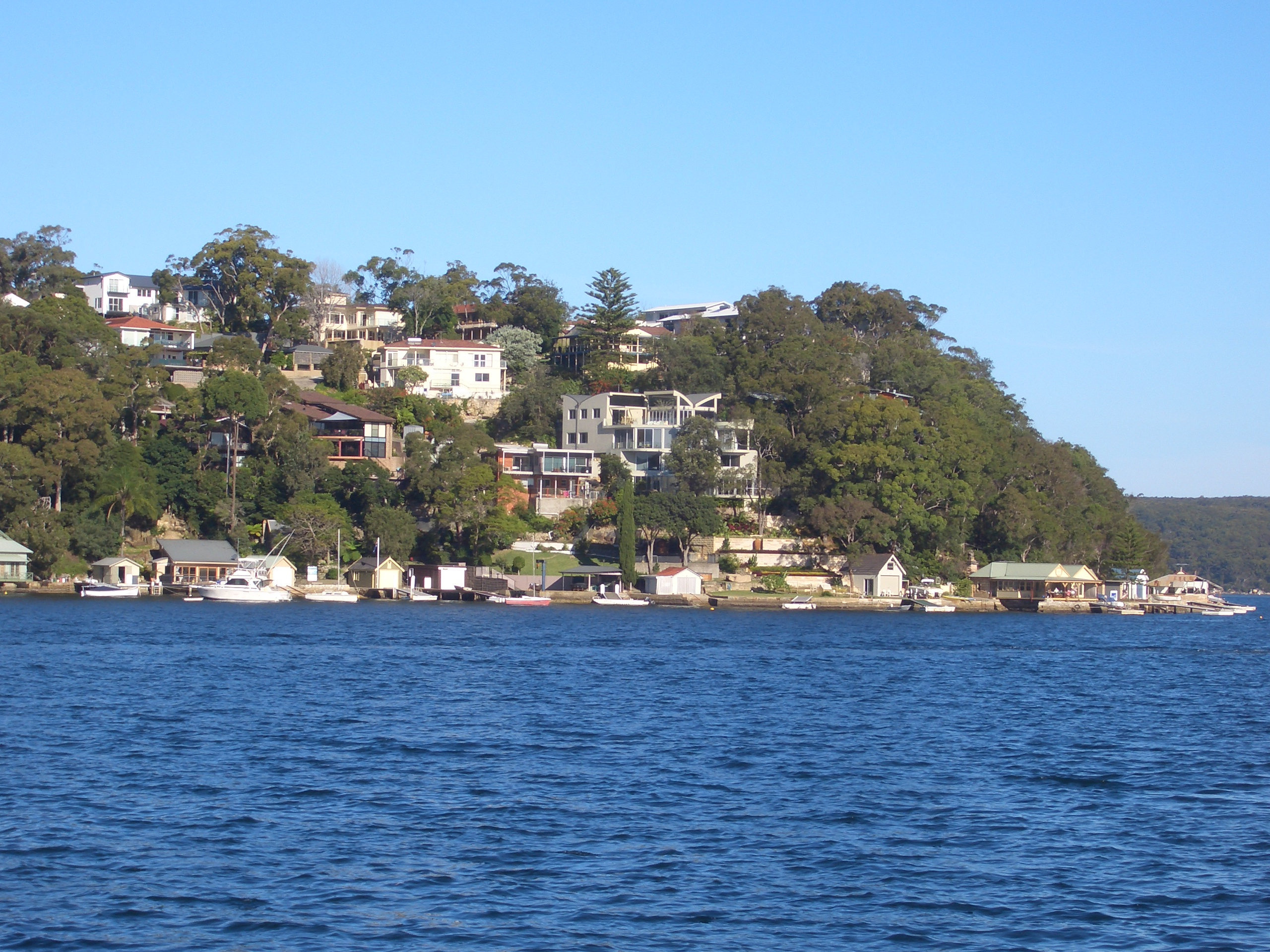
Willarong Point, Caringbah

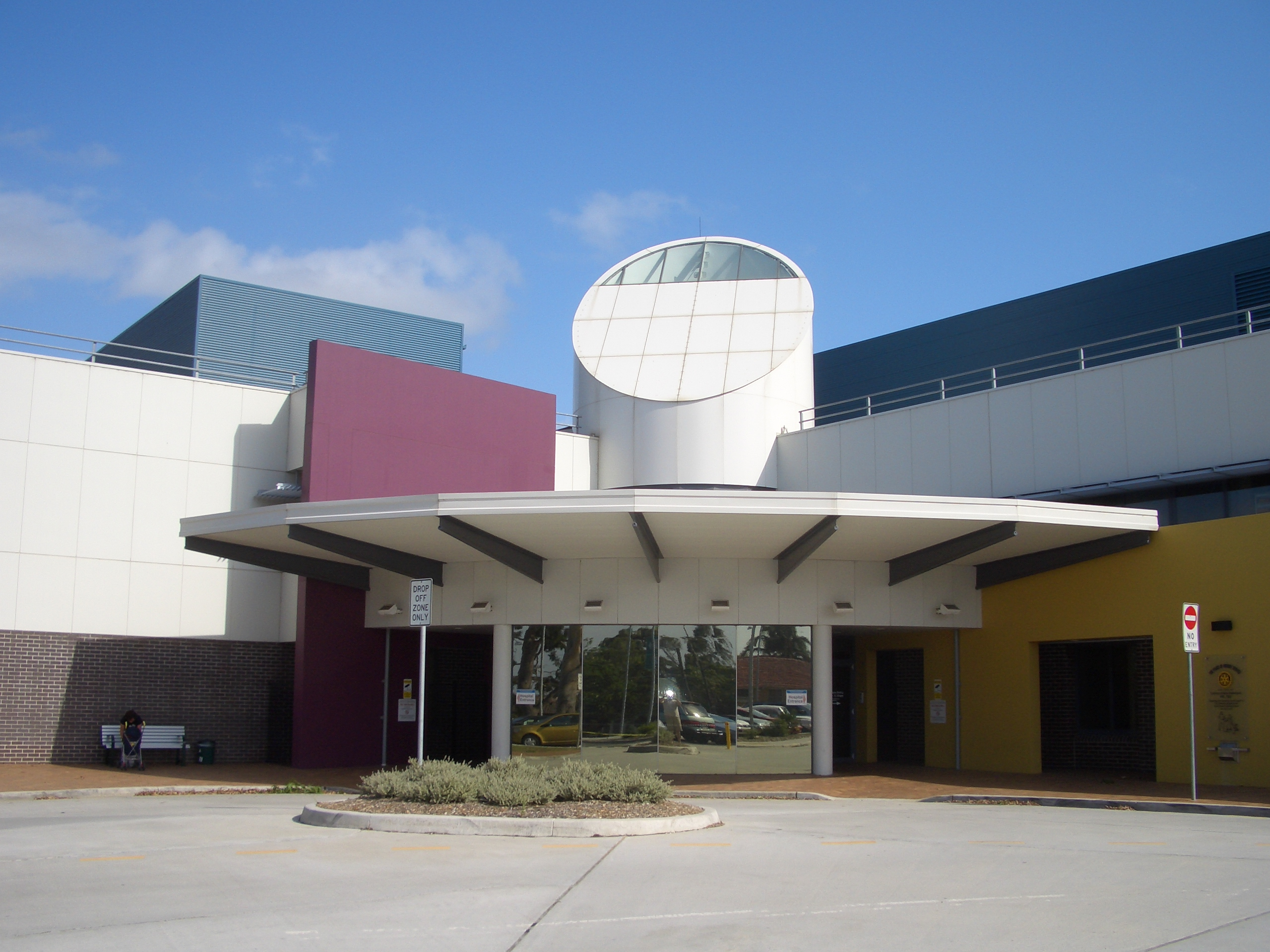
Sutherland Hospital

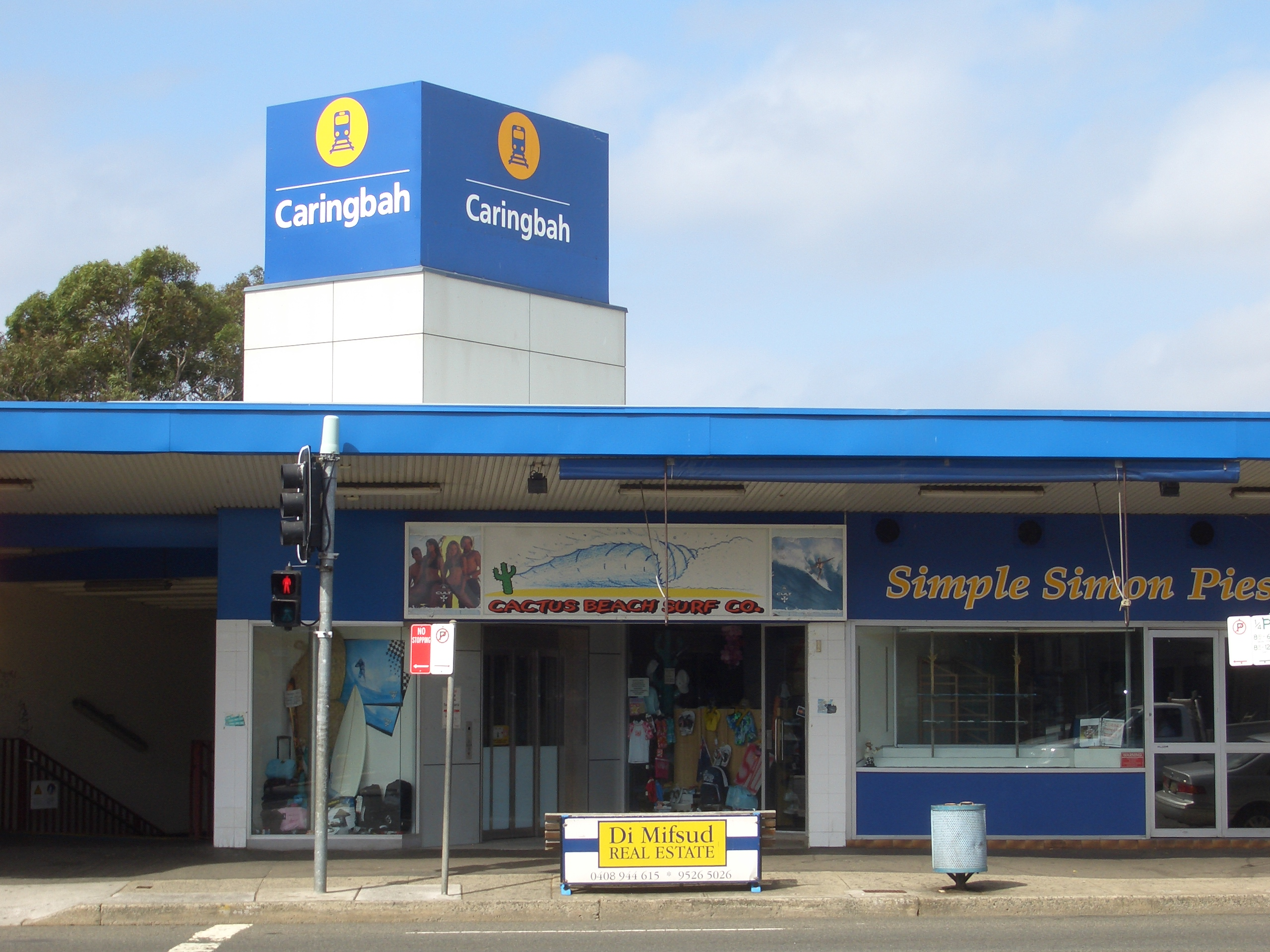
Caringbah railway station

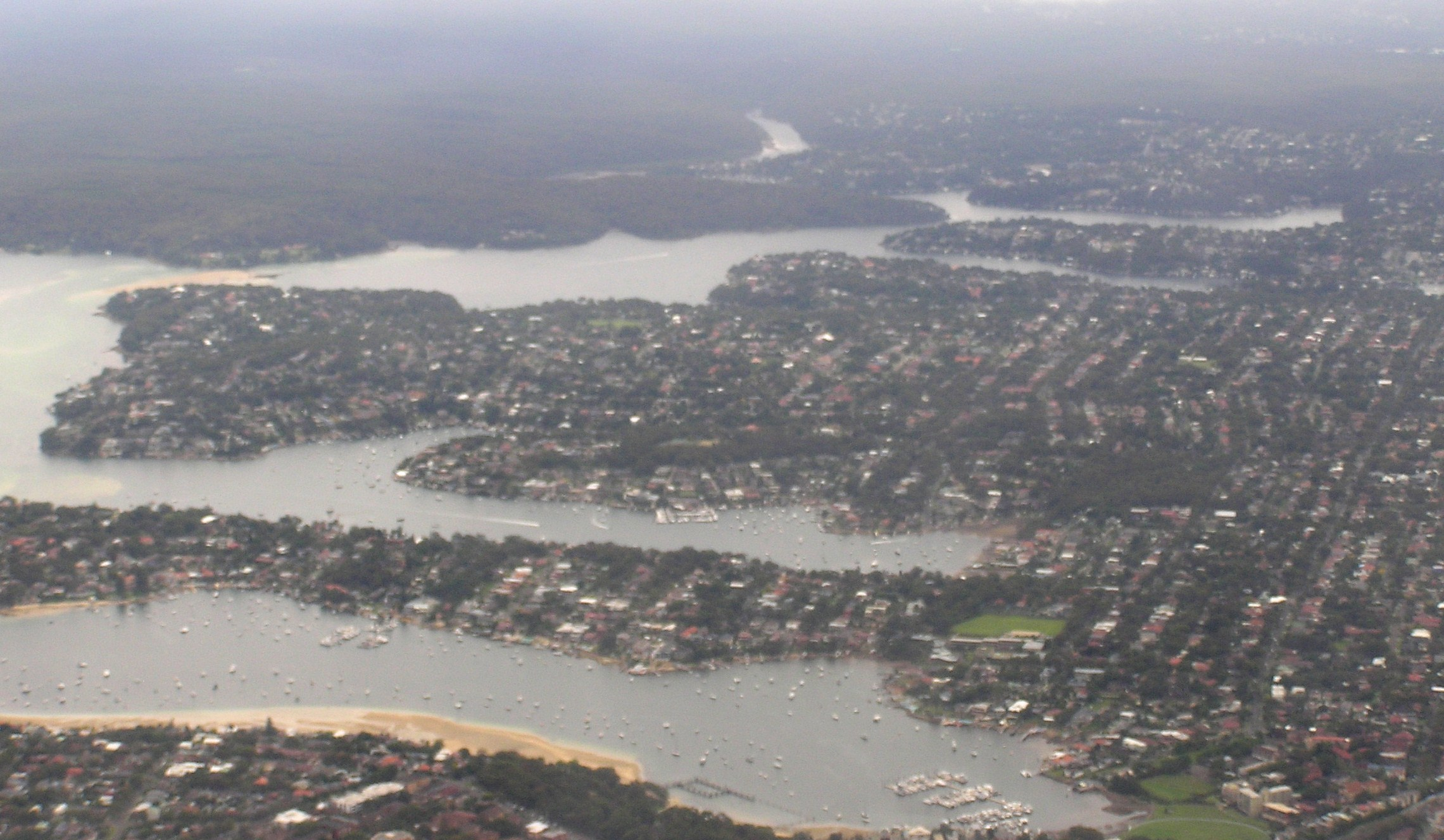
Aerial photo of Burraneer and Caringbah #1

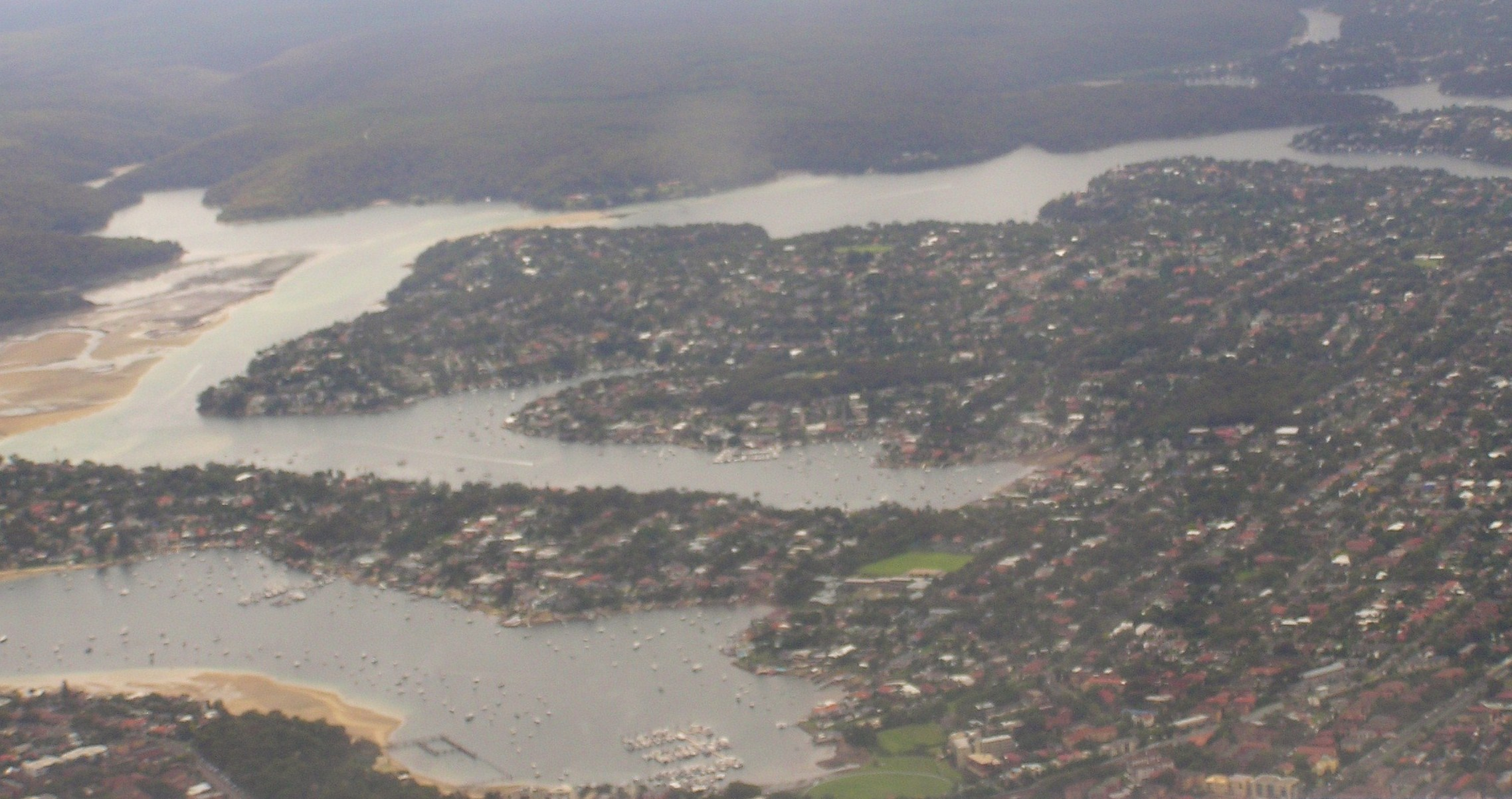
Aerial photo of Burraneer and Caringbah #2

== Notable people ==
- Robbie Maddison, motorcycle racer
- Mark Vincent, tenor vocalist
- Chad Townsend, football player
