= Government procurement in Australia =

Government procurement

The Australian government's procurement activity is governed by the Commonwealth Procurement Rules and overseen by the Department of Finance. The rules were revised on 1 January 2018. States and territories also have their own procurement policies and legislation.

== Commonwealth procurement ==
The Procurement Coordinator is responsible for:

- providing external parties with an understanding of the Commonwealth Procurement Framework;
- handling of certain procurement-related complaints (although the Procurement Coordinator has no authority to compel a government department to reconsider the conduct or outcome of tender processes for which that department is responsible);
- monitoring issues related to Australian Government procurement; and
- reporting to the Minister for Finance on procurement matters where necessary.

The Senate Order for Entity Contracts of 20 June 2001 (amended 14 May 2015), also known as the Murray Motion, requires ministers to publish details of public contracts valued over AUS$100,000 on the internet and to table a letter detailing such contracts in the Senate.

On 1 December 2016 the House of Representatives and the Senate established a Joint Select Committee to inquire into and report on the Commonwealth Procurement Framework. The Committee reported in June 2017 recommending a series of amendments to the current Commonwealth Procurement Rules. The Australian government issued a response on 14 November 2017 accepting a number of the recommendations but rejecting others.

In 2014 the Australasian Procurement and Construction Council (APCC) and Austroads published Building and Construction Procurement Guide – Principles and Options, a guide "designed to reduce inconsistency" in the way different Australian state and territory agencies approach procurement for road, bridge and non-residential building projects.

Infrastructure Australia has issued a national Public Private Partnership (PPP) Policy and set of guidelines on behalf of the federal government, which apply to all PPP projects released in Australia.

Australia ratified the Agreement on Government Procurement (GPA) on 5 April 2019 and participation in the requirements of the agreement came into effect on 5 May 2019.

== New South Wales ==
New South Wales legislation includes the Public Works and Procurement Amendment (Enforcement) Act 2018 (NSW). This law empowered the NSW Procurement Board to issue directions or policies on procurement.

== Northern Territory ==
The Northern Territory's Procurement Act 1995 is the principal legislation regarding procurement, supplemented by procurement directions, procurement rules and procurement circulars.

== Queensland ==
Queensland's Government Procurement Strategy, subtitled "Backing Queensland Jobs", came into effect on 1 September 2017. Annastacia Palaszczuk, Queensland's Premier, stated in the strategy that this "major shift in procurement" would "put Queenslanders first", by support[ing] genuine local jobs, by demonstrating a commitment to those businesses that share our commitment to Queenslanders" and "deliver greater transparency in procurement planning across agencies". The strategy includes a target to "increase procurement with Aboriginal and Torres Strait Islander businesses with a target of 3% of addressable spend by 2022". Implementation of the strategy and the Queensland Procurement Policy is overseen by the Office of the Chief Advisor – Procurement, but each government agency is responsible for its own procurement in practice.

Tender opportunities and a forward procurement pipeline are published on the government's QTenders site.

== South Australia ==
Public procurement in South Australia is overseen by the State Procurement Board (SPB) and the objectives of the State Procurement Act 2004 are to advance government priorities and objectives by a system of procurement for public authorities directed towards:

- obtaining value in the expenditure of public money
- providing for ethical and fair treatment of participants
- ensuring probity, accountability and transparency in procurement operations.

The South Australian government actively encourages award of contracts to Aboriginal Business Enterprises and suppliers in remote Aboriginal communities.

The SPB's International Obligations Policy, updated in April 2020, requires the principal officer of all public authorities in South Australia to ensure compliance with the requirements of the Government Procurement Chapters (GP Chapters) of each free trade agreement to which the South Australian Government is a party.

== Tasmania ==
Public bodies in Tasmania are required to comply with the Treasurer's Instructions on Purchasing and Property. The Department of State Growth's Tasmanian Wood Encouragement Policy has been established to ensure that (where feasible) sustainably sourced wood is fully considered within Government procurement decision-making.

== Victoria ==
In April 2018, the Victorian Social Procurement Framework was established as a whole-of-Government approach to generate social value above and beyond the value of the goods, services or construction procured. It became mandatory for relevant public bodies on 1 September 2018.

== Western Australia ==
Since 1 July 2018, government departments in Western Australia have been required to award an increasing percentage of contracts to registered Aboriginal businesses under the state's government's Aboriginal Procurement Policy. The target was 1% of contracts initially, increasing to 2% on 1 July 2019 and 3% on 1 July 2020.
