= Department of Main Roads (New South Wales) =

- DMR logo used from circa 1930s to 1980s

Agency overview
- Formed: December 1932
- Preceding Agency: Main Roads Board
- Dissolved: 15 January 1989
- Superseding Agency: Roads & Traffic Authority
- Type: Government Department
- Jurisdiction: New South Wales
- Headquarters: Sydney
- Employees: 8,050 (1988)
- Annual budget: $1 billion (1988)
- Minister responsible: Bruce Baird, Minister for Roads
- Agency executive: Bernard Fisk, Commissioner of Main Roads
- Key document: Transport (Division of Functions) Act of 1932

The Department of Main Roads (DMR) was an agency of the Government of New South Wales, responsible for planning, constructing and maintaining major road infrastructure. The DMR directly managed highways and major roads and provided funding to local councils for regional and local roads. The agency was merged with other agencies to form the Roads & Traffic Authority in 1989.

== History ==
The Ministry of Transport was established in December 1932 by way of the Transport (Division of Functions) Act of 1932, following the dismissal of the Lang Government and the subsequent state election. The ministry consisted of three departments, including the Department of Main Roads and the Department of Road Transport & Tramways. The departments were established as the incoming Stevens Government and its Minister for Transport Michael Bruxner sought to reorganise the management of the road network in NSW. The new department essentially resumed the functions that had been held by the Main Roads Board from 1925 until March 1932, when they were transferred to the Department of Transport by the Lang Government.

The Transport (Division of Functions) Act of 1932 provided for the appointment of a Commissioner of Main Roads who held the powers necessary to manage the major highways of the state. Hugh Hamilton Newell was appointed as the first Commissioner. The new Department also took over the management of the newly constructed Sydney Harbour Bridge from the Public Works Department.

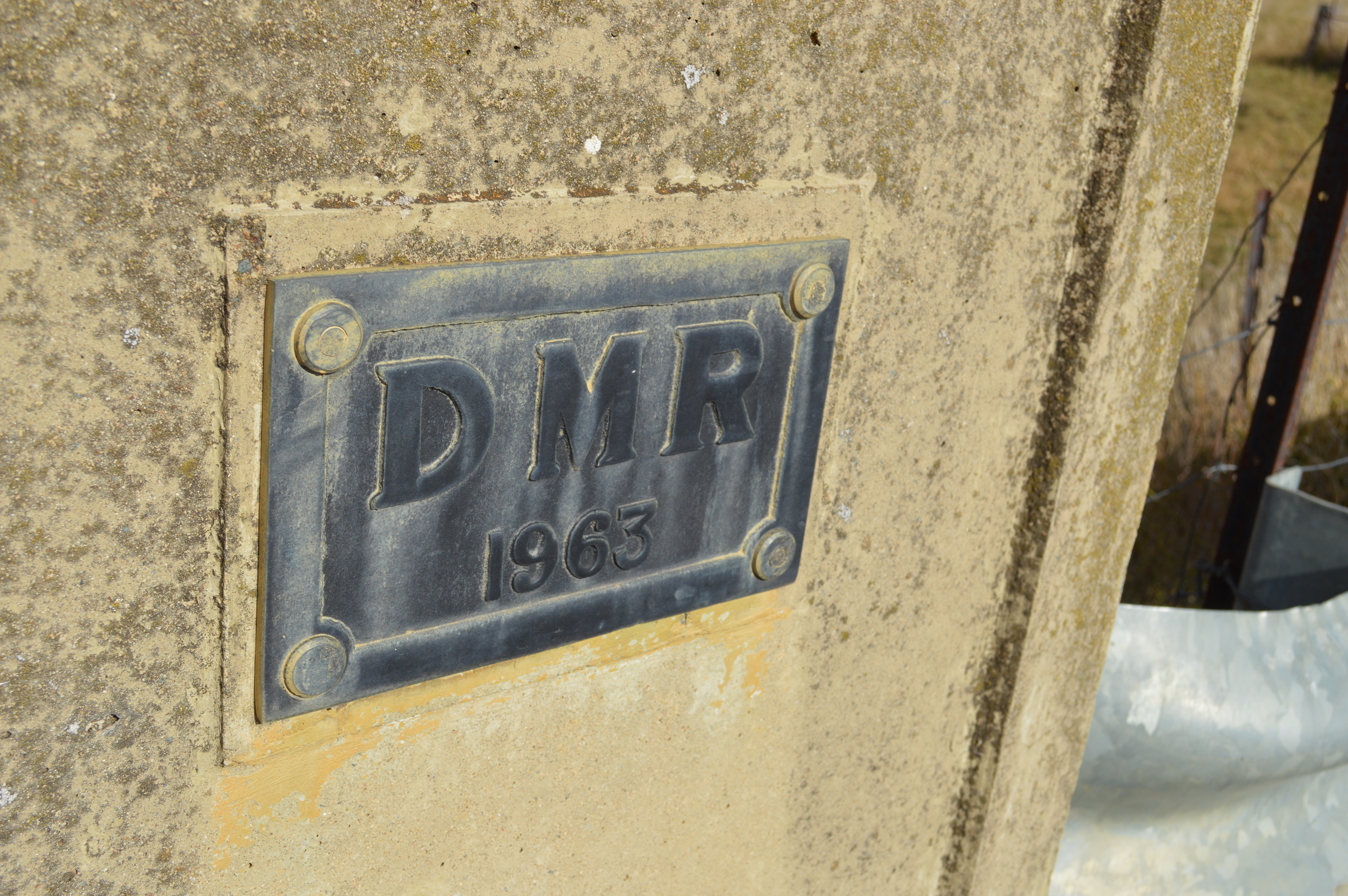
DMR date plaque on the Inglewood Bridge over the Lachlan River near Gunning

In 1976 the responsibilities for managing traffic, including the operation of the traffic signal system, were transferred to the DMR from the Department of Motor Transport, which was a successor of Department of Road Transport and Tramways. Many specialist traffic management staff and traffic signal maintenance crews also became part of the DMR at this time.

Pursuant to the Transport Administration Act 1988, the DMR merged with the Traffic Authority of New South Wales and the Department of Motor Transport to form the Roads & Traffic Authority on 16 January 1989.

DMR logo used from circa 1980s to 1989

== New South Wales Road Classification ==
When formed, the DMR was responsible for managing 26,321 km of the major roads in NSW. These were formally classified as:

- State Highways
- Trunk Roads
- Main Roads
- Secondary Roads
- Developmental Roads

By 1972 this network had grown to 43,292 km and by then also included some additional classifications:

- Freeways
- Tourist Roads
- Unclassified roads in the remote western parts of the State

Local roads continued to managed by local councils.

== Organisation ==
The Department of Main Roads was headed by a Commissioner who was a statutory appointment by the Minister for Roads. The department employed salaried staff who carried out planning, management and administrative tasks and day labour staff who undertook road and bridge works.

For much of its existence the DMR undertook a significant proportion of its road and bridge construction and all its maintenance activities using its own labour force. It also operated major mechanical workshops, asphalt plants, spray sealing crews, road linemarking teams and materials testing laboratories.

In 1932 the Department had a total employment of 2,425. By 1970, as tasks expanded, this number had grown to 11,497. In the later 1970s and through the 1980s successive waves of internal re-organisation led to more work being let out to contract with the total employment number dropping to 8,700 by the time the Department ceased to exist in 1989.In a 1963 report detailing planning and design of urban expressways, the Department of Main Roads Urban Investigations Engineer expressed that an expressway could act as aneffective barrier between residential, commercial and industrial area. It also included that an expressway "through a slum area may facilitate its redevelopment".

The DMR at one time paid staff to undertake the UNSW Highway School, headed up by Professor Blunden, who then returned to join the traffic section.

In a 1963 report detailing planning and design of urban expressways, the Department of Main Roads Urban Investigations Engineer expressed that an expressway could act as aneffective barrier between residential, commercial and industrial area. It also included that an expressway "through a slum area may facilitate its redevelopment".

On 21 June 1965 Murray Fairlie convened a meeting of 67 transport practitioners in the Department of Main Roads offices, to create the Traffic Planning & Control Group group. This was the origin of the AITPM, now Transport Professionals Australia. The Australian Institute of Traffic Technology had its roots in the establishment of Professor Ross Blunden's School of Traffic Engineering at the University of N.S.W. in 1957. Professor Dennis Orchard's Highway School was associated with the school of traffic engineering.

The DMR had a "pre-disposal to road building". Milton Morris said during his 9 years and 8 months as the Minister for Transport, one of his "continual festering sores" was that "the D.M.R. was a law unto itself"

== List of commissioners ==
No.	Commissioner	Took office	Left office
1	Hugh Hamilton Newell	29 Dec 1932	15 Mar 1941 (Died while holding office)
2	David Craig	17 Mar 1941	1 Aug 1946 (Died while holding office)
3	Alfred Toyer	2 Aug 1946	18 Aug 1953 (Died while holding office)
4	Howard Sherrard	19 Aug 1953	19 Apr 1962
5	John Shaw	20 Apr 1962	25 Aug 1967
6	Russell Thomas	26 Aug 1967	25 Aug 1974
7	Andrew Schmidt	26 Aug 1974	12 Jan 1976
8	Brian Sexton	13 Jan 1976	17 Nov 1981 (Died while holding office)
9	Bruce Loder	18 Nov 1981	2 Nov 1986
10	Bernard Fisk	3 Nov 1986	15 Jan 1989

== Notable employees ==
- Ray Wedgwood

== National Affiliations ==
The Department of Main Roads became a member of Conference of State Road Authorities (COSRA) when that organisation was formed in 1934 and then, from 1959, the National Association of Australian State Road Authorities (NAASRA). When NAASRA was transformed into Austroads in 1989 the DMR's successor the Roads & Traffic Authority became a foundation member.

== Publication ==
From 1929 until 1984, Main Roads was the DMR's inhouse journal that was published quarterly.
