= Dolls Point =

- Suburb
- Interactive map of Dolls Point
- Country: Australia
- State: New South Wales
- City: Sydney
- LGA: Bayside Council
- Location: 17 km (11 mi) south of Sydney CBD

Government
  - State electorate: Rockdale
  - Federal division: Cook

Population
  - Total: 1,633 (2021 census)
- Postcode: 2219
Suburbs around Dolls Point
Sans Souci	Sans Souci
Sans Souci	Dolls Point	Botany Bay
Sans Souci	Sandringham

Dolls Point is a small suburb in southern Sydney, in the state of New South Wales, Australia. Dolls Point is located 17 km south of the Sydney central business district and is part of the St George area. Dolls Point is in the local government area of the Bayside Council.

== History ==
Dolls Point was originally a deserted landscape, which was considered uninhabitable. The origins of the name are unclear but legend has it that it was named for an escaped convict who took shelter in the dire landscape to hide from the authorities.

The area between Cooks River and Georges River was originally known as Seven Mile Beach. It was changed to Lady Robinsons Beach in 1874 to honour the wife of Governor Sir Hercules Robinson. Cook Park is named after Samuel Cook who advocated it as a public pleasure area.

Historic Primrose House became the Royal South Sydney Community Health Centre.

== Geography ==
Dolls Point takes its name from the geographical formation on Botany Bay. Cook Park runs along the eastern border and the beach stretches from Dolls Point to Sandringham Bay. Dolls Point is a quiet residential suburb that has managed to maintain an uncluttered landscape. Its village feel makes it a family friendly neighbourhood. It is home to fine sailing, water views and abundant parkland.

=== Dolls Point beach ===
One of the main attractions is Doll Point Beach, which has the whitest sand in Sydney. Fishing and kite surfing are popular activities in the beach. The beach sets out at the rock groyne and continues to the southwest for 550 metres past a seawall and a small tidal pool to a western deviation in the sandy shore at a groyne in front of a sailing club in Georges River. The beach is fairly precipitous and reflective, which is opposite of the deep 1 km wide river mouth to Towra Point.

== Commercial area ==
A small group of shops, along with the Sans Souci Library, are located at the intersection of Clareville Avenue and Russell Avenue, on the border with Sans Souci and Sandringham.

== Population ==
According to the 2021 census of Population, there were 1,633 residents in Dolls Point. 60.2% of people were born in Australia. 57.6% of people spoke only English at home. Other languages spoken at home included Greek at 12.0%. The most common responses for religious affiliation were Catholic 23.3%, No Religion 21.4%, Eastern Orthodox 20.1%, Not stated 8.2% and Anglican 7.3%.

== Gallery ==
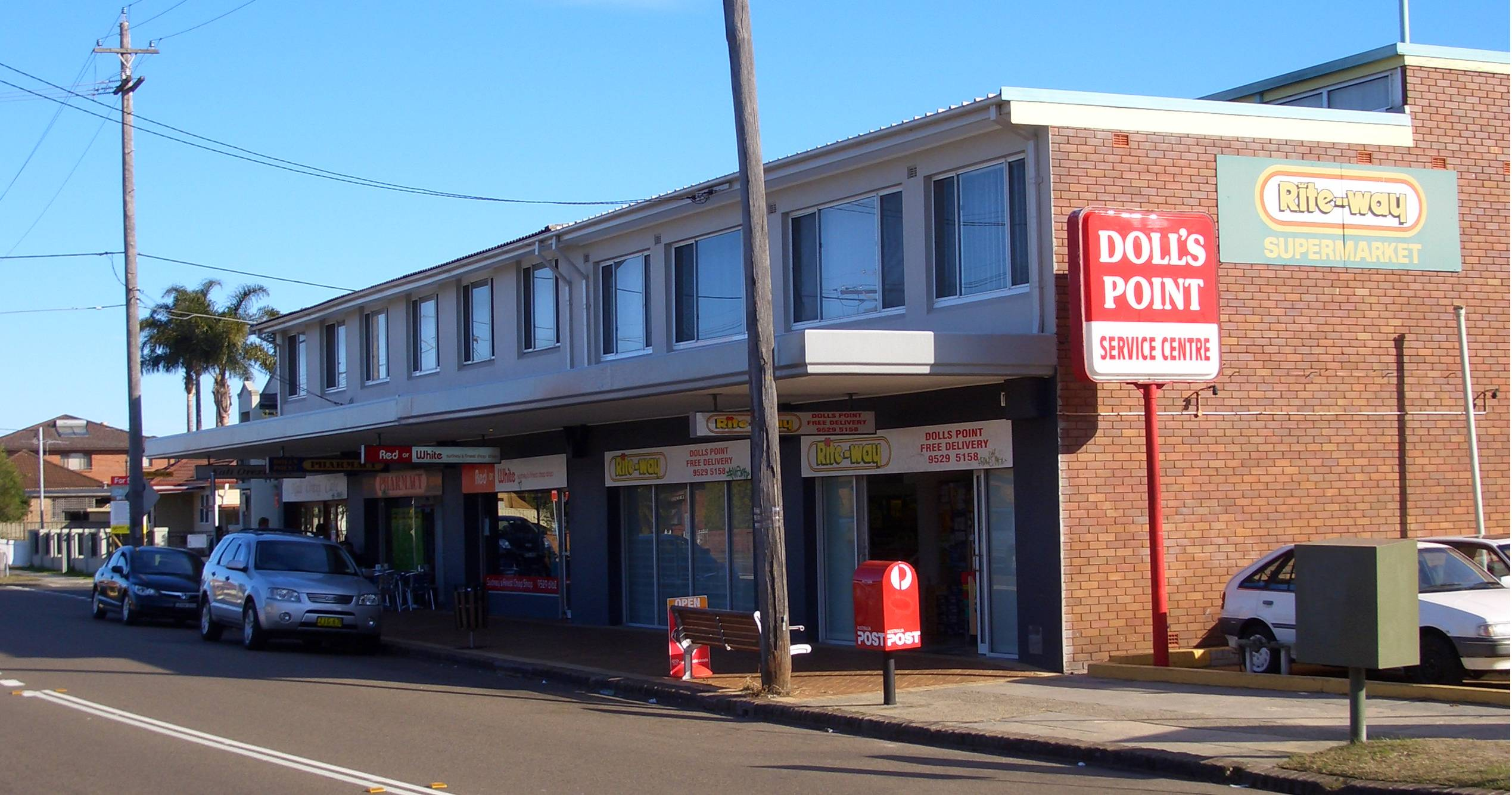
Clareville Avenue, Dolls Point

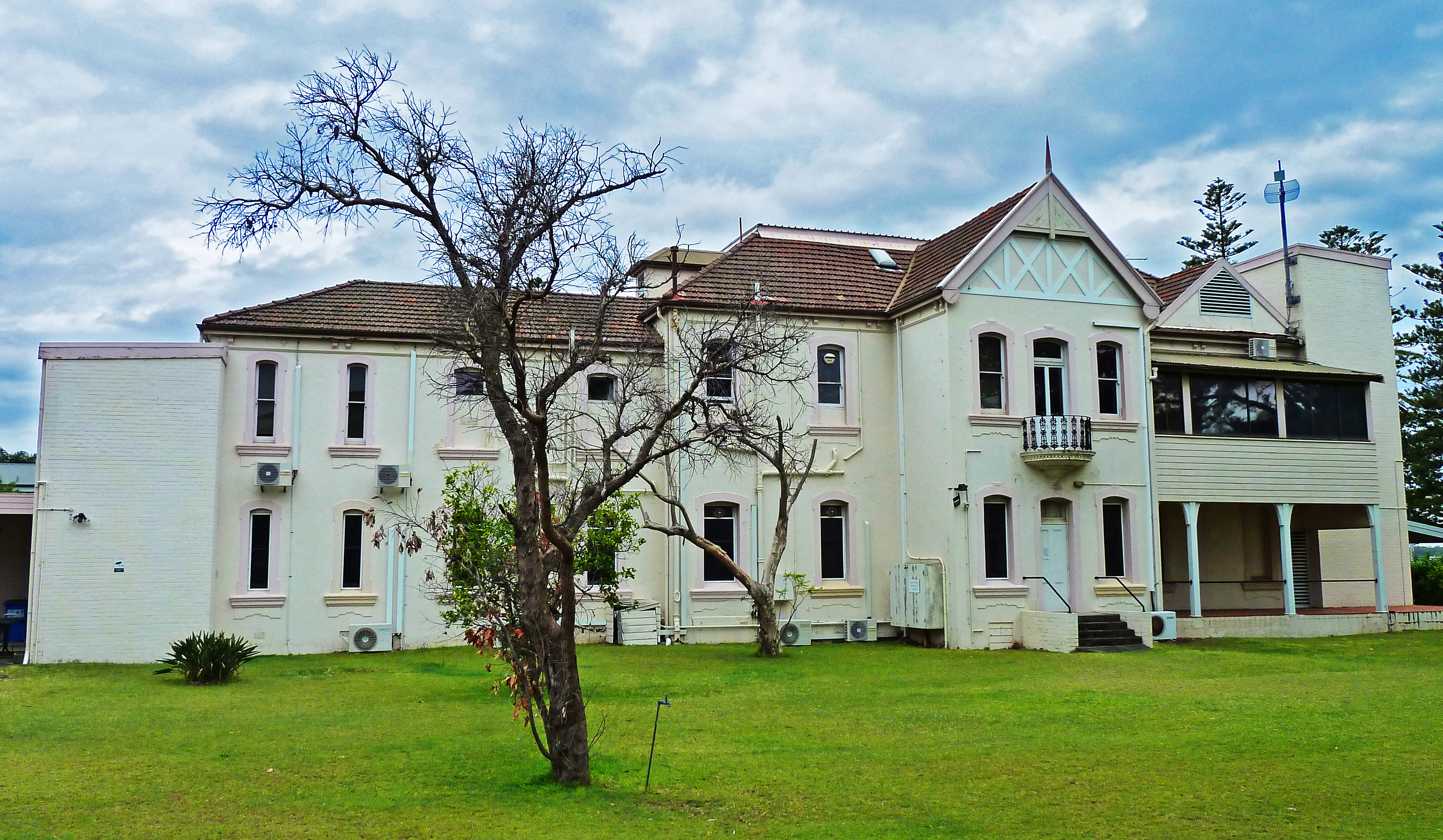
Primrose House

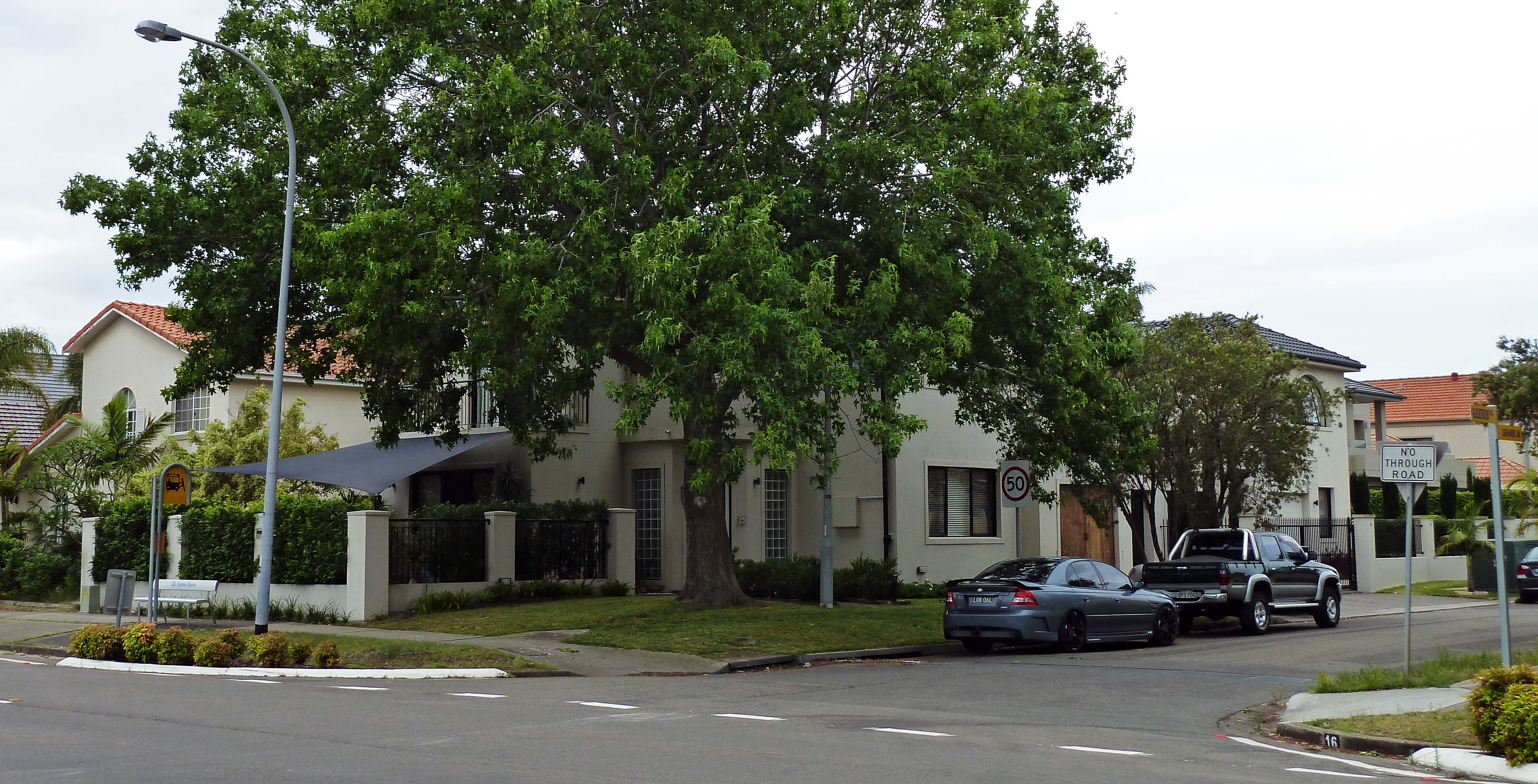
Malua Street

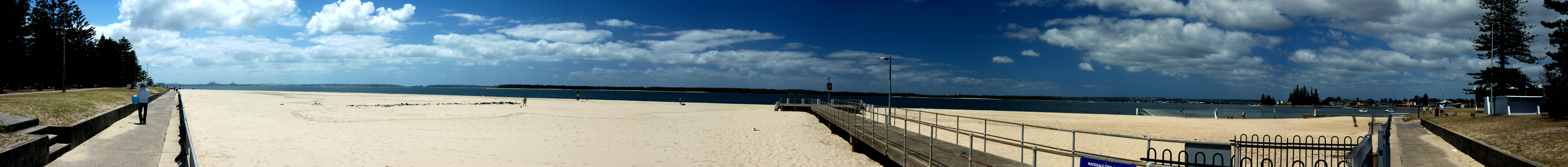
Dolls Point Beach – Peter Despina Reserve/Beach

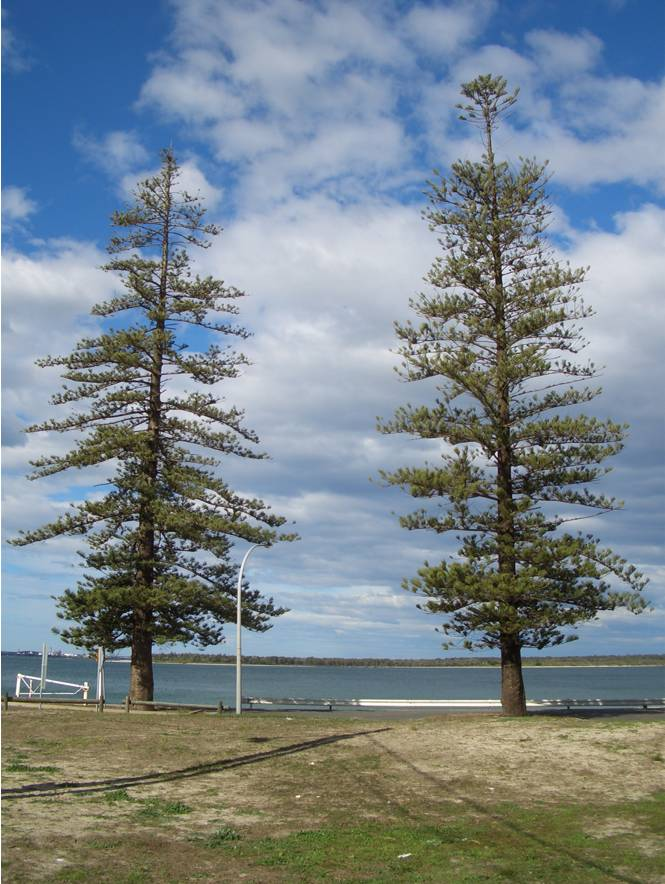
Cook Park

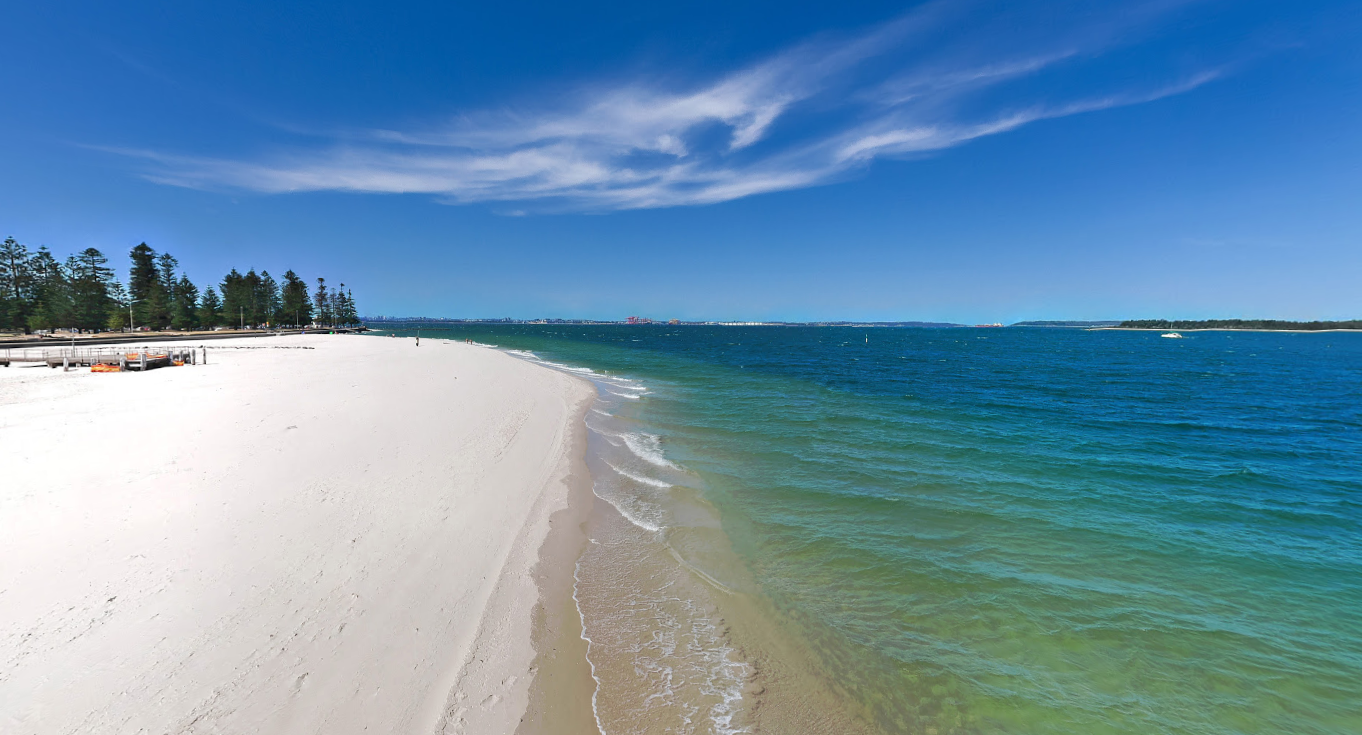
Dolls Point Beach
