= Captain Cook Bridge, Sydney =

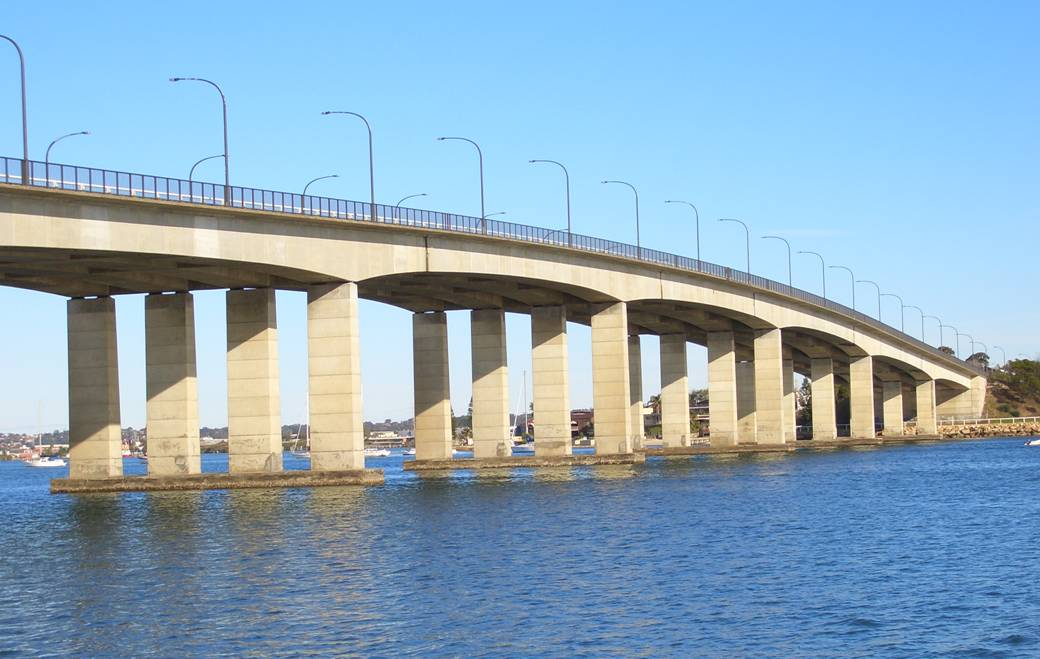
- Captain Cook Bridge, viewed from Sans Souci
- Coordinates: 34°00′29″S 151°07′39″E
- Carries: Taren Point / Rocky Point Roads: Motor vehicles; Pedestrians; Bicycles
- Crosses: Georges River
- Locale: Southern Sydney, New South Wales, Australia
- Named for: Captain James Cook
- Owner: Transport for NSW
- Preceded by: Tom Uglys Bridge

Characteristics
- Design: Box girder
- Material: Precast prestressed concrete
- Total length: 506 metres (1,660 ft)
- Width: 27.5 metres (90 ft)
- No. of spans: 7
- No. of lanes: 3 northbound; 3 southbound; 2 grade-separated shared footpaths and cycleways

History
- Constructed by: John Holland Group
- Construction start: 1962
- Construction end: 1965
- Construction cost: A$3 million
- Opened: 29 May 1965
- Replaces: Punt: between Sans Souci and Taren Point: (1916–1929)

Location
- Interactive map of Captain Cook Bridge, Sydney

The Captain Cook Bridge is a road bridge that carries Taren Point and Rocky Point Roads across the Georges River in Southern Sydney, in the state of New South Wales, Australia. The precast prestressed concrete girder bridge crosses near the river mouth as it empties into Botany Bay; and links the St George and Sutherland areas of Sydney. The bridge comprises a dual carriageway with three lanes in each direction of highway grade-separated conditions; and pedestrian and bicycle traffic, via two grade-separated paths. on the eastern and western sides of the bridge.

== Location and features ==
The Captain Cook Bridge consists of seven spans totalling 475 metres (1,558 ft) in length, with a 506-metre (1,660 ft) long deck that is 27.5 metres (90 ft) wide with six traffic lanes and two shared bicycle and pedestrian paths. Its foundations extend as deep as 67 metres (220 ft) below water level to its sandstone base. The bridge was opened on 29 May 1965 and links Rocky Point Road at Sans Souci in the St George area to Taren Point Road at Taren Point in the Sutherland Shire. Loop walkways run under the bridge at both sides and provide access along the foreshore.

The bridge was designed by a team of engineers from the Department of Main Roads (DMR) led by Albert Fried. When the bridge went out to tender, an alternative design created by Brian Barmby and proposed by John Holland was accepted. The DMR's Resident Engineer for the construction was Ray Wedgwood, who was later the Chief Bridge Engineer for the Roads and Traffic Authority. The main contractor was John Holland Group.

The bridge is the easternmost of the seven major crossings of Georges River. The others are Tom Uglys Bridge, which opened in 1929, Alfords Point Bridge (1973, duplicated 2008), M5 Milperra bridge (1992), Milperra Bridge (replacement bridge 1966), Liverpool Bridge (replacement bridge 1958), and M5 Casula bridge (1985, widened 1988).

The Captain Cook Bridge is the only section of the planned F6 Freeway that has been built in the Sydney metropolitan area, with the other built sections being between Waterfall and Bulli Tops and further south between Gwynneville and Yallah. On the southern approach the two carriageways of the approach road diverge to allow for construction of a future interchange to also carry freeway traffic to and from the bridge.

The speed limit on the bridge and the 1 km (0.62 miles) of freeway on the southern approach is 80 kilometres per hour (50 mph).

The bridge was designed to have the capacity to carry 30,000 vehicles on a weekday, but in 2015 the bridge was estimated to be carrying 30,600 vehicles per weekday.

== History ==
A ferry service ran between Sans Souci and Taren Point from 1911. From April 1916 a vehicular punt ran between the two points, and continued to do so even after the opening of the Tom Uglys Bridge in 1929.

The Captain Cook Bridge is named in honour of Captain James Cook, a British explorer, navigator, cartographer, and captain in the Royal Navy, who landed at nearby Kurnell on 29 April 1770, during his first voyage of discovery aboard the Endeavour.

A big part of commissioning construction of the Captain Cook Bridge in 1962 was that the nearby three-laned Tom Ugly's Bridge was carrying more traffic than any three lanes of the Sydney Harbour Bridge, and the Taren Point punt was at full capacity carrying 1000 cars daily.

== Gallery ==
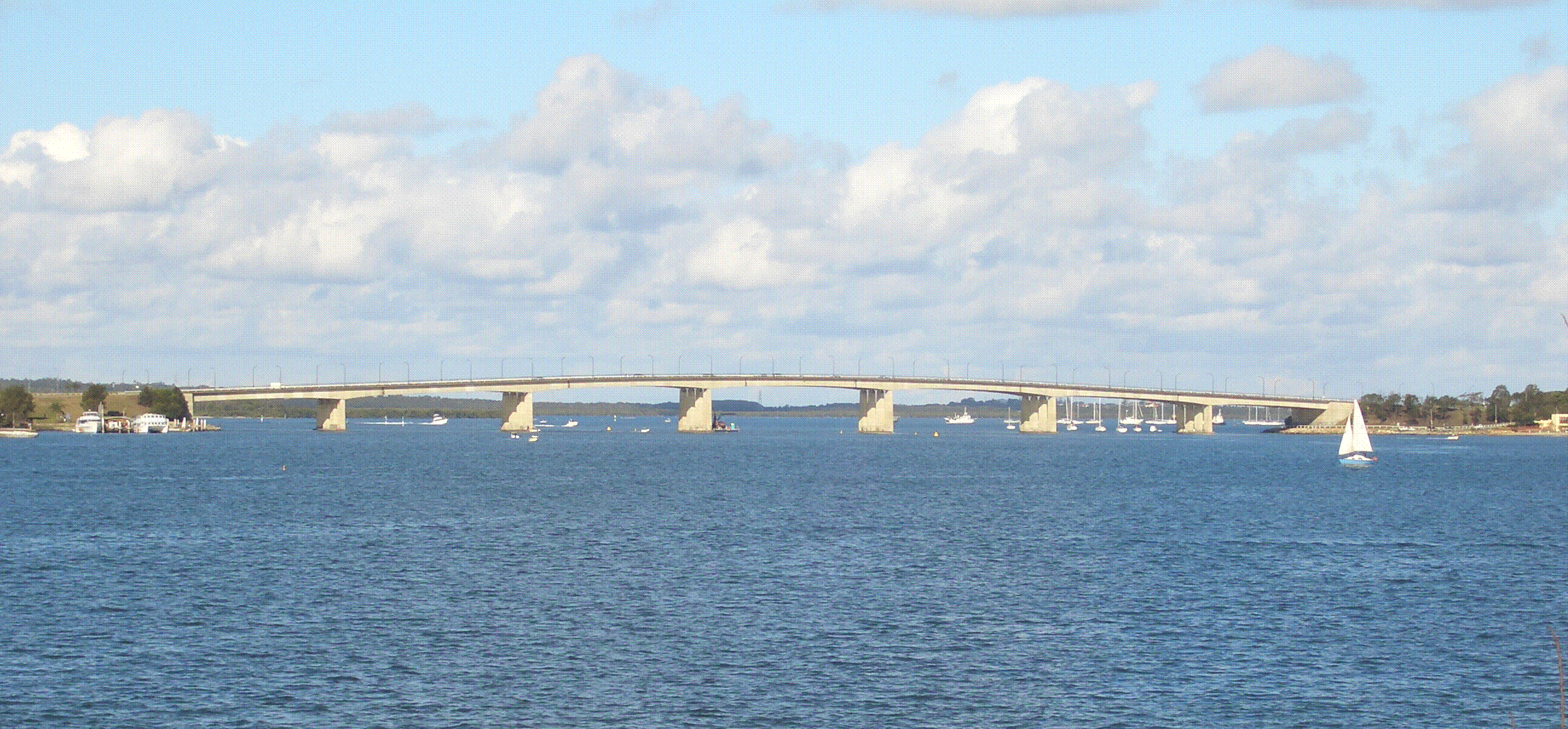
Captain Cook Bridge, as viewed from Blakehurst

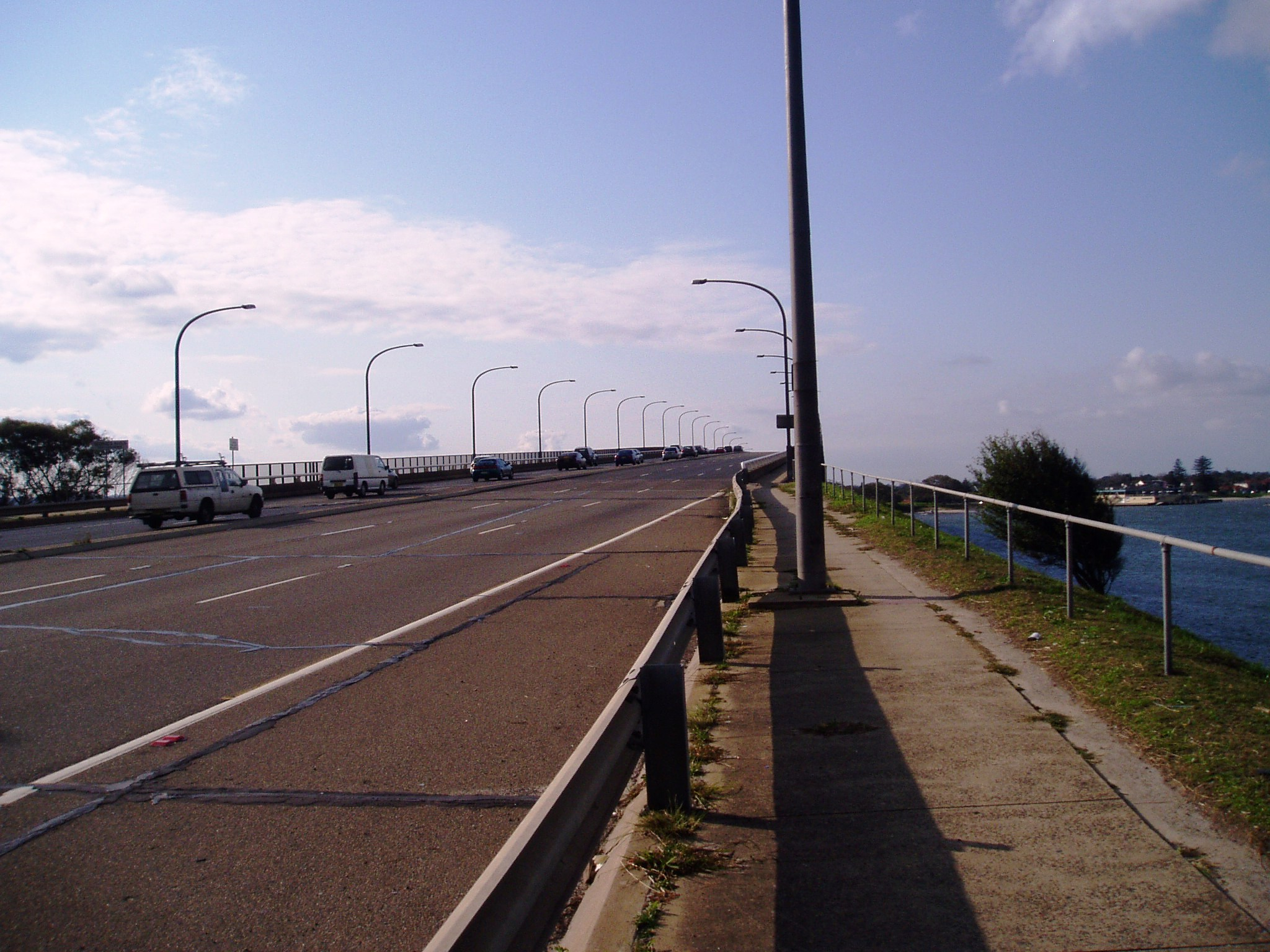
Captain Cook Bridge, as viewed from Taren Point Road

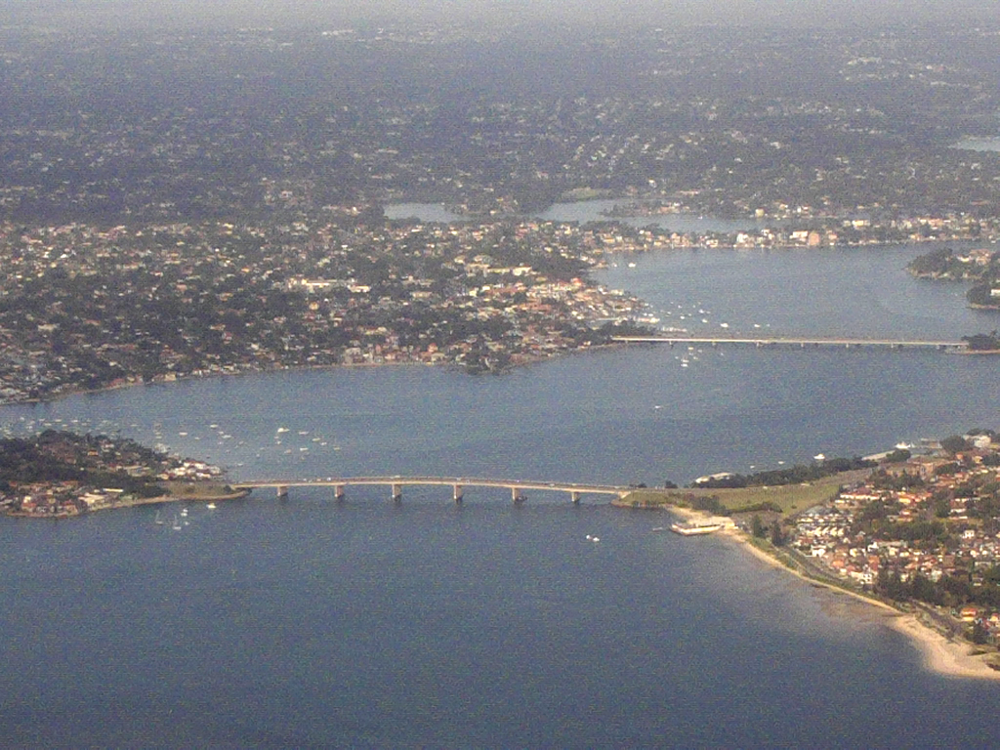
Captain Cook Bridge in the foreground, and Tom Uglys Bridge behind

Captain Cook Bridge taken from Taren Point end at night

== See also ==
- List of bridges in Sydney
- Princes Motorway
