= Sans Souci, New South Wales =

Sans Souci
- Suburb
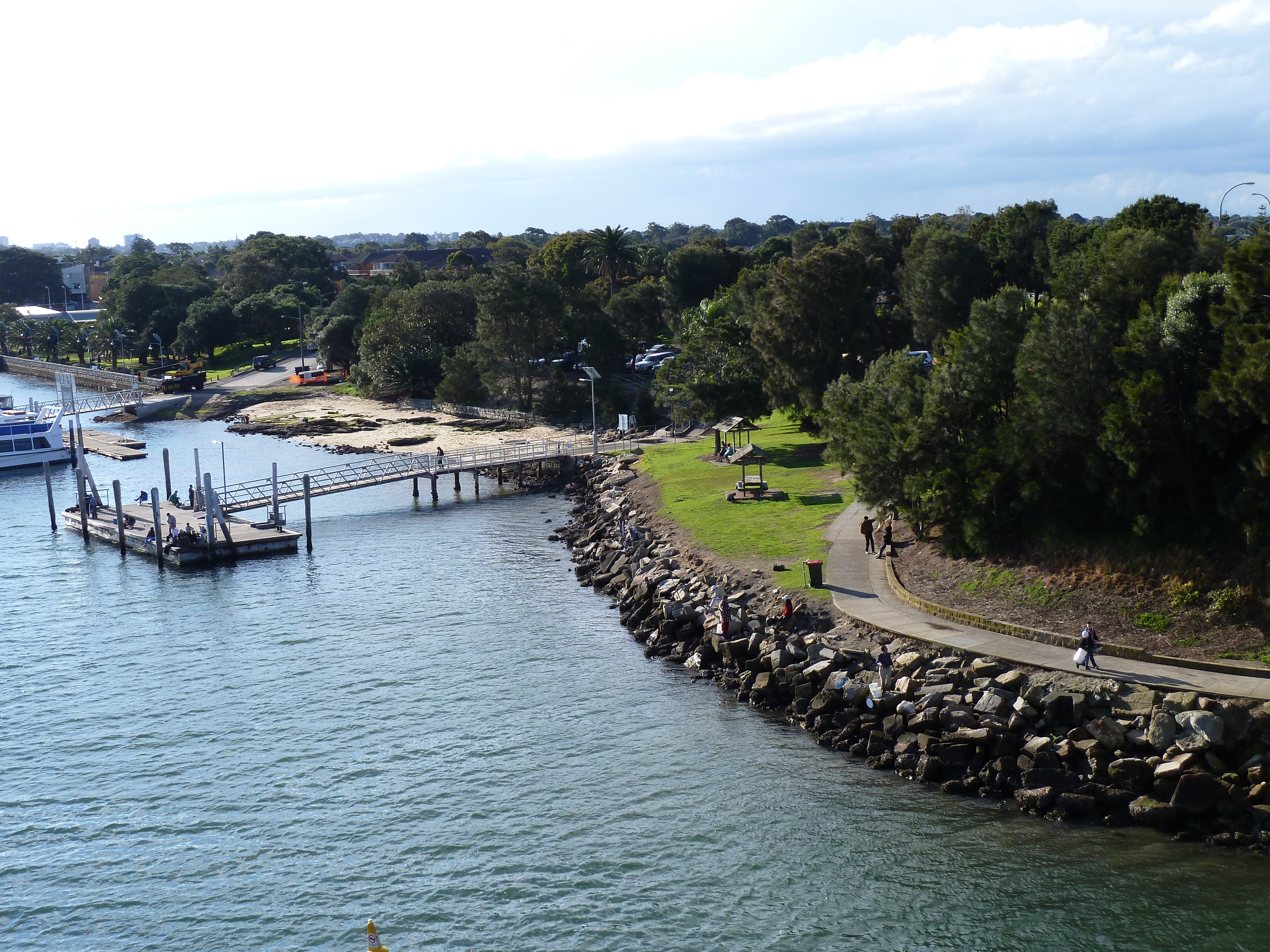
- Sans Souci c. 2010

- Interactive map of Sans Souci
- Country: Australia
- State: New South Wales
- City: Sydney
- LGAs: Bayside Council; Georges River Council
- Location: 17 km (11 mi) south of Sydney CBD

Government
  - State electorate: Rockdale
  - Federal division: Cook
- Elevation: 5 m (16 ft)

Population
  - Total: 10,864 (SAL 2021)
- Postcode: 2219
Suburbs around Sans Souci
Beverly Park	Ramsgate	Ramsgate Beach
Kogarah Bay; Carss Park	Sans Souci	Dolls Point
Blakehurst	Taren Point	Sandringham

Sans Souci (/sænz suːsiː/) is a Southern Sydney suburb in the state of New South Wales, Australia. Sans Souci is 17 kilometres south of the Sydney central business district and lies across the local government areas of the Bayside Council and the Georges River Council. It is part of the St George area.

Sans Souci sits on the western shore of Botany Bay. Lady Robinsons Beach and Cook Park run along the eastern border. Kogarah Bay runs along the western border. Sans Souci is connected to Taren Point, in the Sutherland Shire, to the south, by the Captain Cook Bridge over the Georges River.

== History ==
Sans Souci is a French term meaning "without care", in other terms, "no worries". The area between Cooks River and Georges River was originally known as Seven Mile Beach. It was changed to Lady Robinson's Beach in 1874 to honour the wife of Governor Sir Hercules Robinson. Cook Park is named after Samuel Cook, who advocated it as a public pleasure area.

Catherine Cooper was given a 100-acre (0.40 km^{2}) grant in the area in 1830, where she and husband, Robert Cooper Junior, built a home. The Coopers later operated a distillery there; the land was known as Charlotte Point and then Rocky Point.

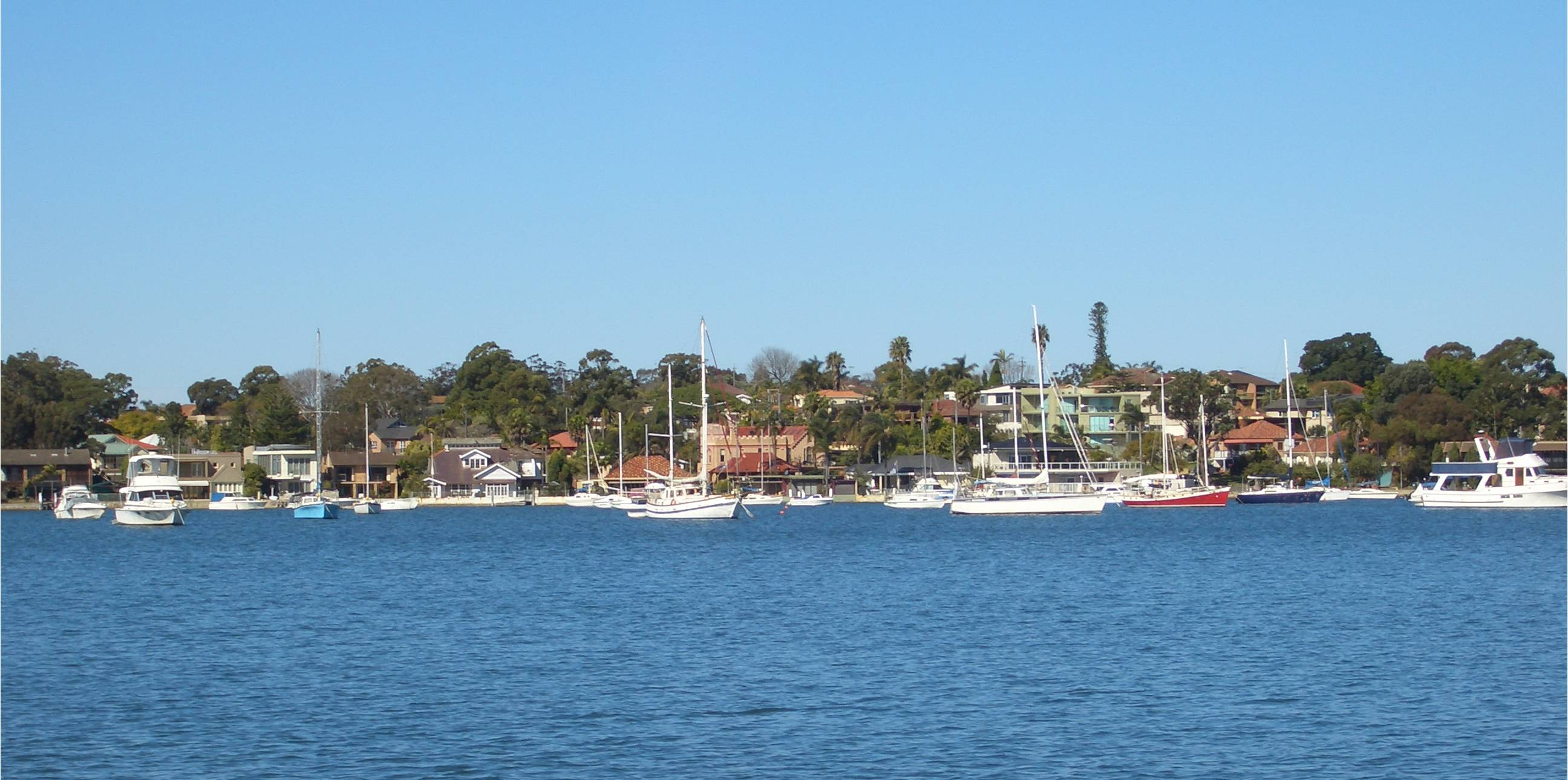
Sans Souci, view across Kogarah Bay

Sans Souci took its name from a grand house built on Rocky Point Road on land bought in 1853, by Thomas Holt (1811–1888), a wool merchant and politician, for his German wife. It was named after Sanssouci in Potsdam, Germany, the summer palace of Frederick the Great, King of Prussia. However, Holt thought that the area was too isolated so he built another house at Marrickville, overlooking the Cooks River, which he called The Warren. He bred rabbits for hunting and kept exotic animals, including an alpaca on this property. In the 1860s, Holt sold his Sans Souci property to William Rust, who turned it into a popular hotel, despite its isolation.

A steam tram operated between Sans Souci and Kogarah in the 1890s which allowed people to enjoy bathing, boating and fishing. In 1937, a silent electric trolley bus was introduced that, until 1959, ran from Rockdale to Kogarah, Sans Souci and Dolls Point.

=== Kogarah to Sans Souci tram line ===
This steam tramway opened in 1887, and was replaced by an electric trolleybus service in 1937. It connected with trains at Kogarah station by way of a large balloon loop through the streets, then passed south down Rocky Point Road to Sans Souci, Sandringham and Dolls Point. Small depots at Sandringham and Kogarah serviced the line. The line was single track at each end with a double-track middle section down Rocky Point Road.

== Commercial area ==
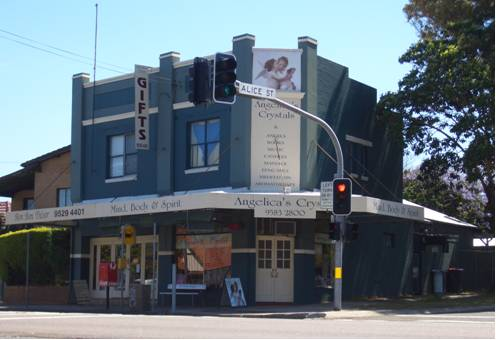
Rocky Point Road

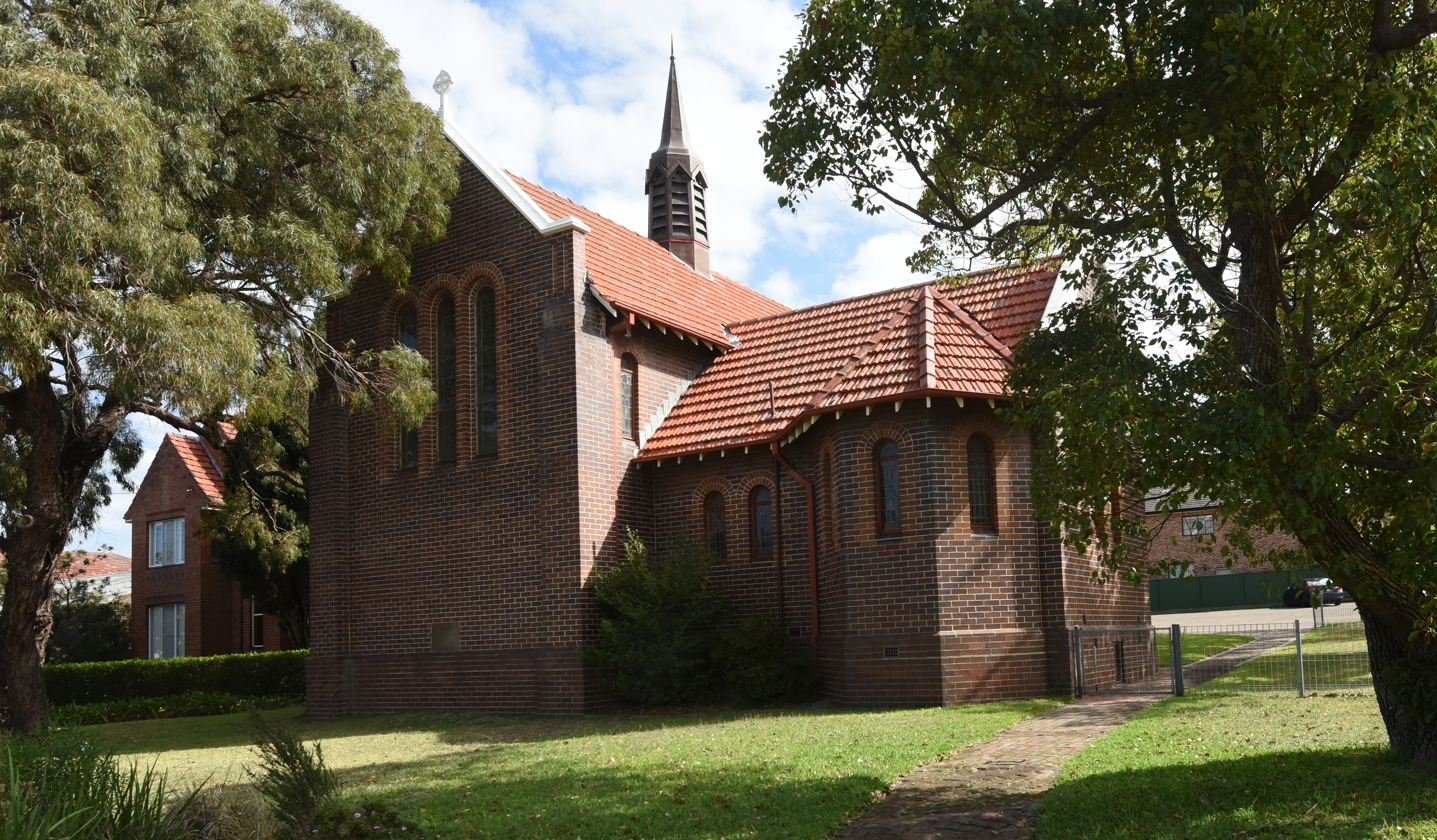
St Andrew's Anglican Church

Sans Souci is a mostly residential area. A shopping strip is located on Rocky Point Road, near the intersection of Sandringham Street, including The Party People, various fast food outlets and the post office. Another small group of shops is located at the intersection of Clareville Avenue and Russell Avenue, on the border with Dolls Point and Sandringham. It includes Sans Souci Library and a variety of small shops and retailers. Two primary schools are located in the suburb: Sans Souci Public and St Finbars.

== Schools and churches ==
- Sans Souci Public School
- St Finbars Catholic School
- St George Christian School (Infants Campus)
- St Finbars Catholic Church
- St Andrews Anglican Church
- Sans Souci Baptist Church

== Parks and recreation ==
- Cook Park, Sans Souci Park, Bona Park, Kendall Street Reserve, Claydon Reserve is a soccer field and playground
- St George Sailing Club, St George Motor Boat Club, Botany Bay Yacht Club
- Sans Souci Leisure Centre,

== Demographics ==
According to the 2021 census, there were 10,864 people usually resident in Sans Souci. 64.7% of people were born in Australia. The next most common countries of birth were Greece (4.4%), China (excluding Special Administrative Regions and Taiwan) (2.4%), Egypt (2.0%), England (1.6%), and New Zealand (1.2%). 56.1% of people spoke only English at home. Other languages spoken at home included Greek (13.9%), Arabic (4.0%), Mandarin (2.5%), Spanish (2.3%) and Macedonian (1.9%). The most common responses for religious affiliation were Catholic (26.2%), Eastern Orthodox (23.8%), No Religion (18.9%), and Anglican (8.4%), a further 6.5% of respondents elected not to disclose their religion.

== Notable residents ==
- Michelle Ford – Swimmer 800 m freestyle champion at the 1980 Summer Olympics.
- Kostya Tszyu – Boxer and two time world junior welterweight champion.
- Sam Sparro – Grammy nominated singer.
- Kay Cottee AO – First woman to sail around the world non-stop and unassisted.
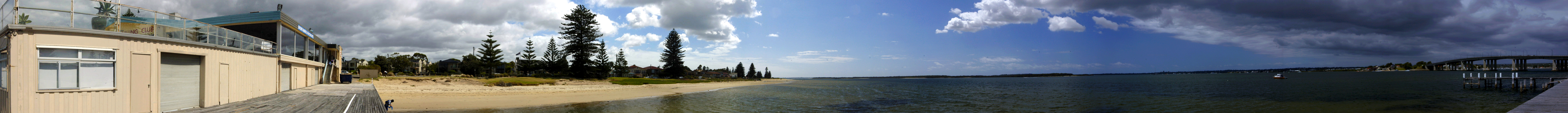
View from Georges River Sailing Club, Sans Souci.
