= Austroads =

Australian government agency

Austroads is the association of Australian and New Zealand road transport and traffic authorities, providing technical input to national transport policy and developing national practices for road transport systems. It publishes guidelines, codes of practice and research reports that promote best practice for road management organisations in Australasia. Austroads is based in Sydney and funded by the Federal Government. However in 2024 the Federal Government has not paid their contribution.

Operations of Austroads are primarily administrative, with all research and engineering work contracted out, such as to produce the Australian standards for construction, planning and design in roads.

Austroads membership comprises:

- Transport for NSW New South Wales
- VicRoads
- Department of Transport & Main Roads, Queensland
- Department of Planning, Transport & Infrastructure, South Australia
- Main Roads Western Australia
- Building Tasmania
- Department of Infrastructure, Planning and Logistics Northern Territory
- Transport Canberra & City Services, Australian Capital Territory
- Commonwealth Department of Infrastructure, Transport, Regional Development & Communications
- Australian Local Government Association
- New Zealand Transport Agency

== History ==
At a conference of the Commonwealth and State Ministers for Transport in Melbourne in 1933, it was decided to form a national body to coordinate road transport planning. The foundation and first meeting of the new 'Conference of State Road Authorities' (COSRA) took place in February 1934, in Melbourne.

After much consideration, and the interruption of World War II, the first national route marking system was introduced in 1954, with a trial signposting of National Route 31 (Hume Highway).

As the substantive role of the organisation grew, in October 1959 the name was changed to 'National Association of Australian State Road Authorities' (NAASRA). In 1960 NAASRA set up the Australian Road Research Board (ARRB) to further coordinate and encourage research into all aspects of road-making, planning and management.

With increasing federal control of roads planning and development, the role of the organisation changed, and in 1989, NAASRA was disbanded and replaced by Austroads.

In 1997, Austroads published Towards a Nationally Consistent Approach to Route Marking, which proposed a new system of alphanumeric route marking, agreed by all the transport ministers in May 1997 for nationwide implementation.

Austroads' remit includes the provision of guidance for vehicle classification and cycling and pedestrian infrastructure.
