= National Transport Research Organisation =

Australian not-for-profit organisation

- Abbreviation: NTRO
- Formation: 1960; 66 years ago
- Type: Nonprofit
- Region served: Australia and New Zealand
- Board Chair: Peter Woronzow
- CEO: Michael Caltabiano
- Revenue: $57 million (FY2023/24)
- Expenses: $55 million (FY2023/24)
- Staff: 212 FTEs (FY2023/24)
- Website: www.ntro.org.au

The National Transport Research Organisation (NTRO), formerly the Australian Road Research Board, is an Australian not-for-profit company that provides independent, applied research and consulting services for Australian and New Zealand state road agencies and communities.

NTRO provides consultancy services in areas such as road safety, pavement engineering, climate change adaptations, road network management, and future transport technology.

NTRO also carries out road condition surveys for Australian and New Zealand road owners such as State Roads' Agencies and local councils at traffic speed using specially equipped vehicles.

== History ==
The NTRO was founded in 1960 as the Australian Road Research Board (ARRB), with the purpose of serving the research needs of its members (largely state road agencies), on a cost recovery basis. It is currently a not-for-profit company that carries out paid consultancies. Since the appointment of Chief Executive Officer Michael Caltabiano, there has been a substantial increase in research activities.

ARRB put its Vermont South headquarters on the market in 2017, its home since the early 1970s. The sale of this land was expected to generate significant revenue, with estimates ranging from $18 million to $25 million. The new head office is located in the former Holden site at Fishermans Bend in Melbourne.

In 2017, ARRB sold off its equipment manufacturing and international operations divisions. This new business is ARRB Systems Pty Ltd.

In 2022, the Australian Road Research Board (ARRB) became the National Transport Research Organisation (NTRO), broadening its scope to cover all modes of transport in both Australia and New Zealand.

== Governance ==
The NTRO is governed by a Board of Directors, all with backgrounds or positions in major transport organisations. The Board Chairman position is held by Peter Woronzow, and the position of Chief Executive Officer by Michael Caltabiano. Caltabiano said he would lead the group towards a focus on innovation, industry collaboration and the next-generation of road and transport solutions.

NTRO is in-part supported by its member organisations, who provide leadership and competitive funding. Member organisations include federal, state and local government bodies responsible for managing the nation’s transport and road networks.

== Activities ==
In July 2015, the first trials of automated cars in the Southern Hemisphere were launched in Adelaide by a consortium, consisting of NTRO, Flinders University, Carnegie Mellon University, the Royal Automobile Association, Cohda Wireless and Bosch. Premier Jay Weatherill announced the trials, stating "Driverless cars have the ability to revolutionise transport in this country, and we want to be at the forefront of that paradigm shift."

NTRO, along with partners including VicRoads, Keolis Downer, La Trobe University and the RACV, launched an autonomous bus (autonobus) trial at La Trobe University's Bundoora campus in late 2017. The electric bus will begin taking passengers in 2018, as a proof of concept of a 'last-mile' solution to mobility.
