= Taren Point =

- Suburb
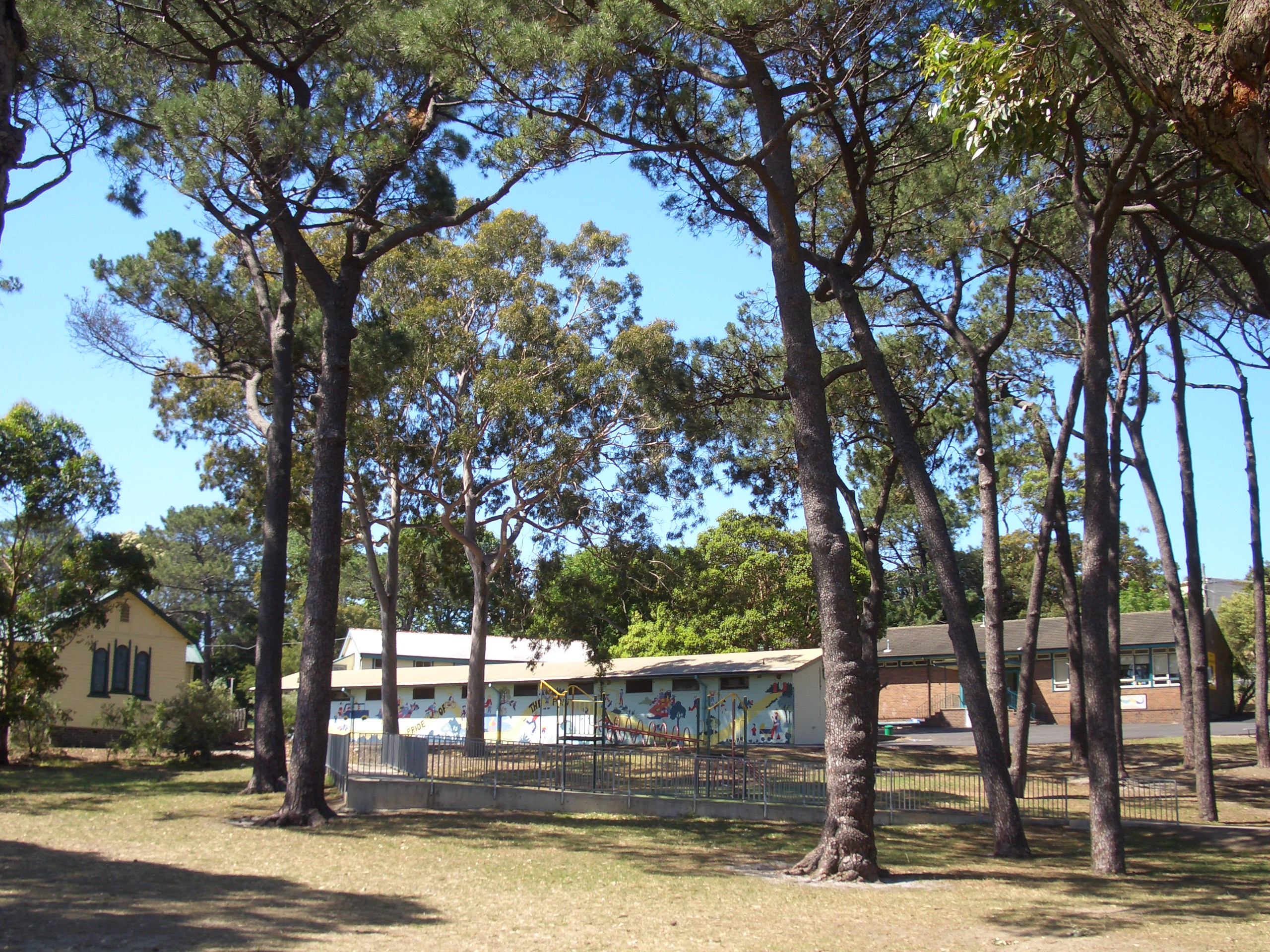
- Taren Point Public School

- Interactive map of Taren Point
- Coordinates: 34°1′9″S 151°7′13″E
- Country: Australia
- State: New South Wales
- City: Sydney
- LGA: Sutherland Shire
- Location: 18 km (11 mi) south of Sydney CBD

Government
  - State electorate: Miranda
  - Federal division: Cook
- Elevation: 13 m (43 ft)

Population
  - Total: 1,879 (2021 census)
- Postcode: 2229
Suburbs around Taren Point
	Sans Souci
Sylvania Waters	Taren Point	Woolooware
Miranda	Caringbah	Caringbah

Taren Point is a small waterfront suburb, in southern Sydney, in the state of New South Wales, Australia 18 kilometres south of the Sydney central business district in the local government area of the Sutherland Shire.

Surrounded by the suburbs of Sylvania Waters and Caringbah, Taren Point is on the peninsula where the Captain Cook Bridge crosses north over the Georges River to Sans Souci, in the St George area.

It contains a mix of residential, shops and retirement home. The residential area is located along the bank of the Georges River, at the mouth of Botany Bay. Most retirement home are centred on Taren Point Road and to the east towards Woolooware Bay.

== History ==
Taren Point was originally called Comyns Point, then Cummins Point and later Commins Point, believed to be after a local resident. The origins of Taren Point are also unclear. Thomas Holt (1811–88) owned the land that stretched from Sutherland to Cronulla and his name is commemorated with Holt Road.

There was a cane toad outbreak in Taren Point in 2010, which was controlled by 2014. No cane toads have been identified in the area since.

== Landmarks ==
- Taren Point Public School
- Gwawley Oval, home of Taren Point Touch Football Association
- Woolooware Shores Anglican Retirement Villages, Diocese of Sydney
- Apsley Field, home ground of the Giants Baseball Club
- Taren Point Bowling Club, home of the Taren Point Power

== Population ==
According to the 2021 census, there were 1,879 people usually resident in Taren Point. 72.2% stated they were born in Australia with the top overseas countries of birth being England (3.5%), China (2.3%) and Greece (1.8%). English was stated as the only language spoken at home by 65.9% of residents and the most common other languages spoken were Greek (7.9%), Arabic (2.4%), Mandarin (2.4%), Macedonian (1.9%) and Italian (1.2%). The most common responses for religious affiliation were Anglican (21.9%), Catholic (20.9%) and No Religion (17.1%).

== Gallery ==
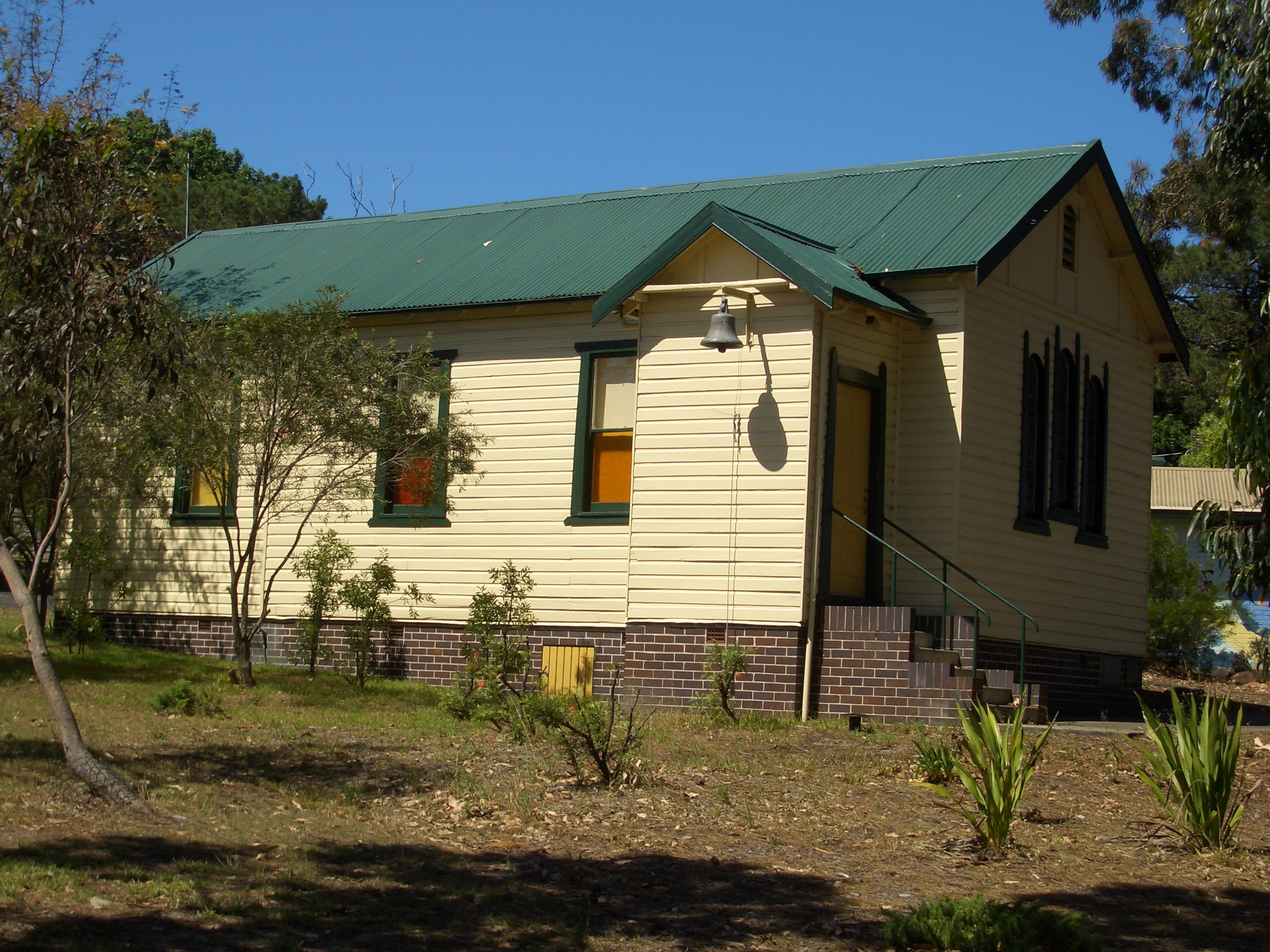
Old school house, Taren Point Public School

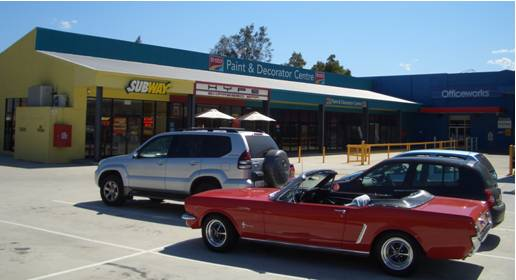
Taren Point commercial development

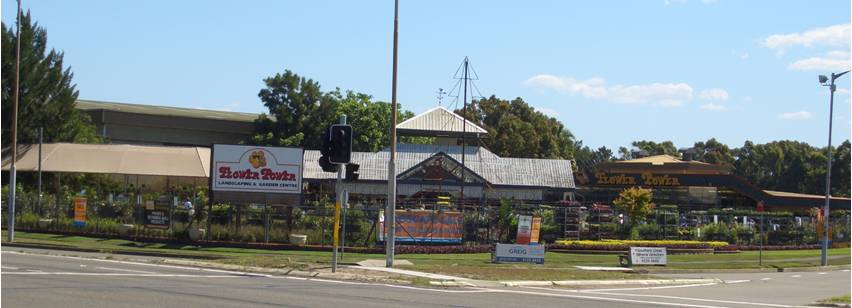
Flower Power, Taren Point Road
