= Carss Bush Park =

Nature reserve and park in New South Wales, Australia

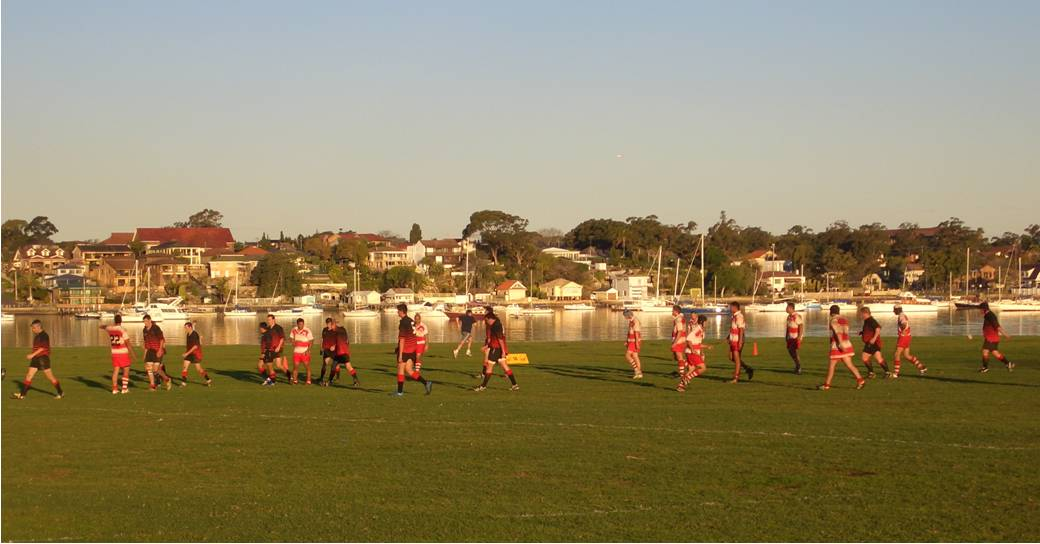
- Rugby union match at Carss Bush Park, in 2006
- Interactive map of Carss Bush Park
- Type: Urban park; nature reserve
- Location: Carss Park, Georges River Council, Sydney, New South Wales, Australia
- Coordinates: 33.990°S 151.117°E
- Area: 20 hectares (50 acres)
- Created: 26 January 1924
- Etymology: William Carss
- Operator: Georges River Council
- Status: Open all year
- Facilities: Carss Park Café and Grill; Kogarah War Memorial Olympic Swimming Pool; Sports fields; Bushland; Beach with Shark net; Playground areas; Picnic and BBQ facilities
- Website: www.georgesriver.nsw.gov.au/Environment/Parks-and-Reserves/Iconic-Parks/Carss-Bush-Park

Carss Bush Park is a 20-hectare (50-acre) nature reserve and urban park located at 74 Carwar Avenue, in the Sydney suburb of Carss Park, Georges River Council, New South Wales, Australia.

== History ==
Carss Bush Park is situated on a land grant made to Jonathan Croft of 48 hectares (119 acres) on 28 January 1853. Within ten months Croft sold the land to William Barton on 17 October 1853 for A£352. This land speculation was to continue for another two years with sales in June 1854 to John Chappellow, for A£538 and in September 1855 to Lewis Gordon possibly in default of a mortgage.

Gordon sold the 48 hectares (119 acres) to William Carss on 7 January 1863 for A£540. Carss was one of fifty tradesmen (stonemasons and carpenters) who had been recruited in Glasgow by Dr John Dunmore Lang. Carss arrived in Sydney in 1831 accompanied by his wife Helen Turnball. A cabinet maker by trade he found work as the chief carpenter and joiner for the construction of Lyndhurst under John Verge, architect.

Located within the park in the heritage-listed Carss Cottage, believed to have been built by December 1865, when Carss changed his address to the 'George's River, Kogarah'. The house is reputed to have been constructed by the Scottish masons who had been employed in the construction of Edmund Blacket's University of Sydney buildings. The stone was reported to be quarried on site from a huge rock in the vicinity of the present-day Norfolk Island pine tree.

William Carss died on 26 May 1878. He was survived by his children Mary, Anne and James. There was also a housekeeper called Amelia Claggett. Carss was buried in the vault near the present day recreation centre. Carss' wife died in 1853. The property was transferred to the daughters Mary and Anne on 1 August 1878. This was subsequently amended on 3 April 1879 solely to Mary. On Mary Carss' death in 1916 the cottage was bequeathed to the Sydney Sailors' Home apparently in accordance with her father's wish. The transfer however did not eventuate until after James' death in the following year. James married the housekeeper, Amelia Claggett, on his death bed. Amelia Claggett remained in the cottage until she was forced to vacate taking most of the furniture with her.

In the mid 1920s the trustees of the Sydney Sailors' Home sold the property to the Kogarah Council for A£12,000. The estate was divided into recreational and residential spaces. The 20-hectare (50-acre) portion that was reserved for park purposes was opened and dedicated on Australia Day 1924 and the remaining 374 suburban lots were offered for sale that day.

In September 2019 the George River Council announced news on the progress of a contraction of an environmentally friendly seawall, made of sandstone, that will operate as an intertidal rock platform, and a piered boardwalk and small boat ramp in the park.

== See also ==
- List of parks in Sydney
