= Carss Cottage =

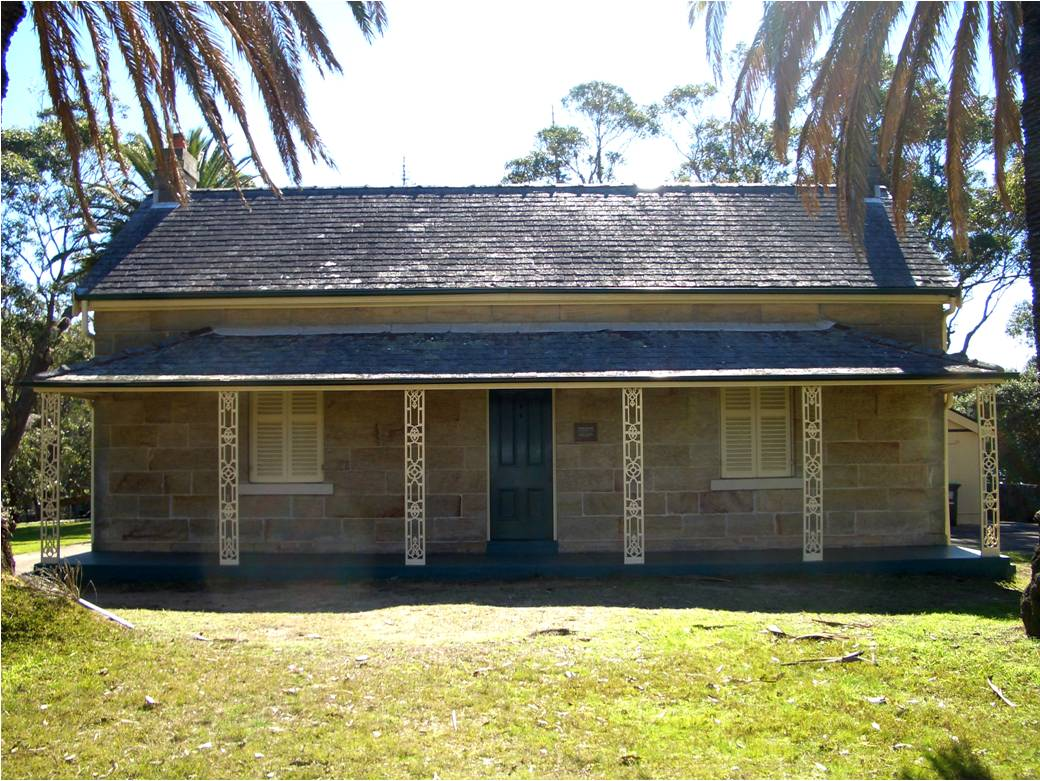
- Carss Cottage, pictured in 2005

- Location within Sydney
- 33°59′26″S 151°07′13″E
- Location: 80 Carwar Avenue, Carss Park, Georges River Council, New South Wales, Australia

History
- Built: 1865
- Built for: William Carss

Site notes
- Owner: Georges River Council

New South Wales Heritage Register
- Official name: Carss Cottage
- Type: State heritage (built)
- Designated: 2 April 1999
- Reference no.: 587
- Type: Cottage
- Category: Residential buildings (private)
- Builders: Scottish masons

Carss Cottage is a heritage-listed former cottage and park ranger's residence and now historical museum located in Carss Bush Park at 80 Carwar Avenue, Carss Park, New South Wales, a suburb of Sydney Australia. It was built during 1865 by William Carss, Cabinet Maker. The property is owned by the Georges River Council. It was added to the New South Wales State Heritage Register on 2 April 1999.

== History ==
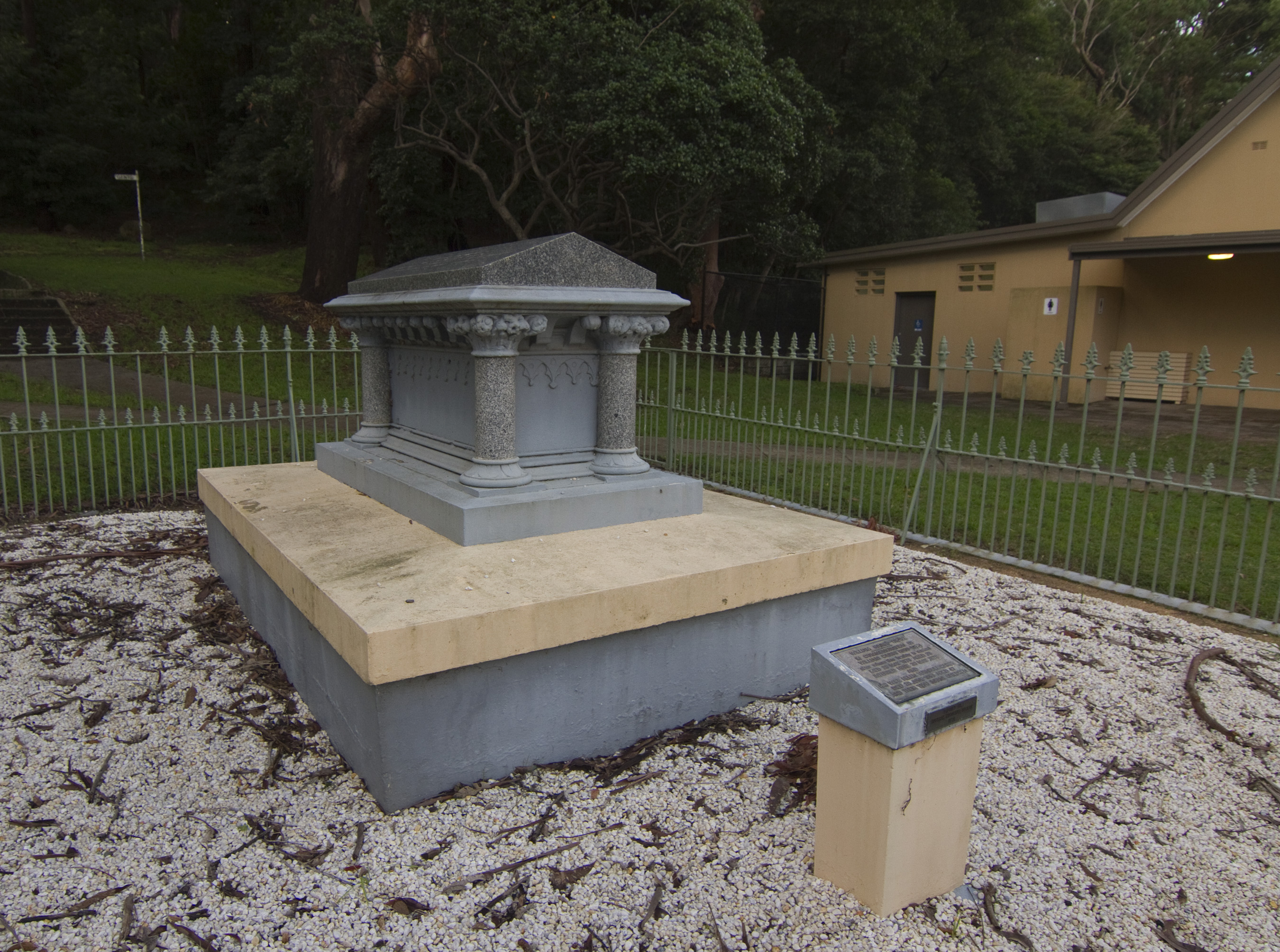
Carss grave, located in the Carss Bush Park

Carss Cottage is situated on a land grant made to Jonathan Croft of 48 hectares (119 acres) on 28 January 1853. Within ten months Croft sold the land to William Barton on 17 October 1853 for A£352. This land speculation was to continue for another two years with sales in June 1854 to John Chappellow, for £538 and in September 1855 to Lewis Gordon possibly in default of a mortgage.

Gordon sold the 48 hectares (119 acres) to William Carss on 7 January 1863 for A£540. Carss was one of fifty tradesmen (stonemasons and carpenters) who had been recruited in Glasgow by Dr John Dunmore Lang. Carss arrived in Sydney in 1831 accompanied by his wife Helen Turnball. A cabinet maker by trade he found work as the chief carpenter and joiner for the construction of Lyndhurst under John Verge, architect.

Carss Cottage is believed to have been built by December 1865, when Carss changed his address to the 'George's River, Kogarah'. The house is reputed to have been constructed by the Scottish masons who had been employed in the construction of Edmund Blacket's University of Sydney buildings. The stone was reported to be quarried on site from a huge rock in the vicinity of the present-day Norfolk Island pine tree.

William Carss died on 26 May 1878. He was survived by his children Mary, Anne and James. There was also a housekeeper called Amelia Claggett. Carss was buried in the vault near the present day recreation centre. Carss' wife died in 1853. The property was transferred to the daughters Mary and Anne on 1 August 1878. This was subsequently amended on 3 April 1879 solely to Mary. On Mary Carss' death in 1916 the cottage was bequeathed to the Sydney Sailors' Home apparently in accordance with her father's wish. The transfer however did not eventuate until after James' death in the following year. James married the housekeeper, Amelia Claggett, on his death bed. Amelia Claggett remained in the cottage until she was forced to vacate taking most of the furniture with her.

In the mid 1920s the trustees of the Sydney Sailors' Home sold the property to Georges River Council for A£12,000. The estate was divided into recreational and residential spaces. The 20-hectare (50-acre) portion that was reserved for park purposes was opened and dedicated on Australia Day 1924 and the remaining 374 suburban lots were offered for sale that day.

The cottage was converted to a new use as the residence of the park's ranger. The first ranger was Joseph Harald Coxhead, who held the position between 1924 and 1953. In 1928 a health inspector's report noted extensive white ant activity, inadequate ventilation and poor drainage. At this time outbuildings were demolished and internal alterations and modifications made to the cottage. During the 1930s landscaping works included the construction of the stone walling, arbor and stone seats.

As a result of the enthusiasm aroused by the lead-up to the 1970 James Cook bicentenary celebrations, Georges River Council decided to form a historical society and to lease Carss Cottage to the Historical Society for use as a historical museum.

== Description ==
The cottage has sandstone walls and a slate roof.

=== Condition ===
Physical condition is good. Archaeological potential is excellent for those documented demolished original outbuildings.

=== Modifications and dates ===
- 1865 – built
- 1924 – estate subdivided and cottage converted for park ranger
- 1928 – outbuildings demolished and internal alterations and modifications made to the cottage.
- 1930s – landscaping works included the construction of the stone walling, arbor and stone seats.

== Heritage listing ==
As at 2 August 2012, Carss Cottage formed a substantial part of a rare setting and is one of the oldest buildings in the southern Sydney area south of the Cooks River. It is the oldest building in the Kogarah area and is associated with the early development of the Kogarah area. William Carss was of sufficient stature in Sydney society in the 1830s as a master craftsman to have been a member of the founding committee of the Sydney Mechanics School of Arts in 1834. It is a rare example of mid Victorian period stone homestead in the southern area of Sydney. Situated on a knoll close to Kogarah Bay and through its largely unspoilt setting, it plays an integral role in the aesthetic and architectural quality of the Bay.

Carss Cottage was listed on the New South Wales State Heritage Register on 2 April 1999 having satisfied the following criteria.

The place is important in demonstrating the course, or pattern, of cultural or natural history in New South Wales.

It forms a substantial part of a rare setting and is one of the oldest buildings in the southern Sydney area south of the Cooks River. It is the oldest building in the Kogarah area and is associated with the early development of the Kogarah area. William Carss was of sufficient stature in Sydney society in the 1830s as a master craftsman to have been a member of the founding committee of the Sydney Mechanics School of Arts in 1834.

The place is important in demonstrating aesthetic characteristics and/or a high degree of creative or technical achievement in New South Wales.

It is a rare example of mid Victorian period stone homestead in the southern area of Sydney. Situated on a knoll to Kogarah Bay and through its largely unspoilt setting, it plays an integral role in the aesthetic and architectural quality of the Bay.

The place possesses uncommon, rare or endangered aspects of the cultural or natural history of New South Wales.

It is the oldest building in the Kogarah area and one of the oldest in the southern Sydney area.

== See also ==
- Australian residential architectural styles
