= Bathurst Old School of Arts Library Collection =

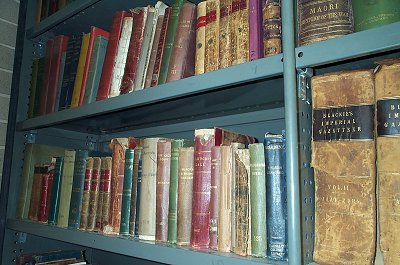
- Part of the Bathurst Old School of Arts Library Collection in closed reserve at Bathurst City Library

- Location within New South Wales Location within Australia
- 33.4228°S 149.5793°E
- Location: Bathurst City Library, 70–78 Keppel Street, Bathurst, Bathurst Region, New South Wales, Australia

History
- Built: 1855–1950

Site notes
- Owner: Bathurst City Library

New South Wales Heritage Register
- Official name: Bathurst Old School of Arts Library Collection; School of Arts book collection; Bathurst Books
- Type: state heritage (movable / collection)
- Designated: 22 October 2004
- Reference no.: 1712
- Type: Recreation & Entertainment Objects
- Category: Collections
- Builders: Various authors and publishers.

Bathurst Old School of Arts Library Collection is a heritage-listed former lending and reference library in Bathurst, in the Central West region of New South Wales, Australia. The collection of rare books was acquired between 1855 and 1950 from various authors and publishers and is now owned by Bathurst Library and stored at the Central Tablelands Collections Facility in Bathurst. It is also known as School of Arts book collection. It was added to the New South Wales State Heritage Register on 22 October 2004.

== History ==
=== The Bathurst School of Arts ===
In 1855 the Bathurst School of Arts and Mechanics Institute was established, offering the beginnings of scientific and technical education in Bathurst. A grant of land to the School of Arts resulted in premises being built by 1861 on the corner of Howick and William Streets on land adjoining the Church of England's All Saints Cathedral. It was a two-storey building designed by local architect, M.H. Sadlier. A long-desired public hall was completed in 1874, helping boost the membership to 324 people.

During the 1870s the School of Arts received an annual grant from the Government on the understanding that "the institution should tend to the intellectual advancement of the people". Early accounts of the lectures and discussions suggest that entertainments were many and varied, including: lectures, tea-drinkings, readings, soirees, bazaars, an occasional circus, "biological-phenomena", mesmerism, and phrenology. The courses of lectures were on occasion ambitious and expensive.

In 1873 the committee of the School of Arts advocated the opening of a working-man's college. For some years during the early 1880s, funds made available by the Government for technical training were controlled by the School of Arts, but by the late 1880s the management of technical education was transferred from the School of Arts committee to a board appointed by the NSW Government. In 1889 the NSW Department of Education became responsible for such education and in 1894 the School of Arts sold its unused land in William Street to the Department of Public Instruction for the construction of a college. The college in William Street, designed by the Colonial Architect Walter Liberty Vernon, was completed in 1898.

=== The Bathurst School of Arts Library Collection ===
The Old Bathurst School of Arts Library Collection was probably begun soon after the establishment of the Bathurst School of Arts in 1855. In the financial year 1913–1914, the School of Arts Library Collection was measured at nearly 20,000 volumes. In the 1940s at least the collection was still housed on the first floor of the 1862 School of Arts building on the corner of William and Howick Streets. Bathurst City Council acquired the collection in 1956 when it took over the Old School of Arts building. The estimated 2,000 books now held in this collection were probably separated out from the Bathurst City Library's general holdings soon after acquisition, and stored together away from public access. They had never been available for lending, although they had been viewed by members of the public from time to time under supervision.

== Description ==
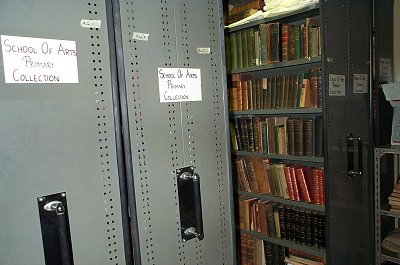
The collection was previously held in the compactus at Bathurst Library

The Old Bathurst School of Arts Collection numbers approximately 2000 books or about 7% of the estimated 30,000 books held by the library in its heyday. The collection was held in the compactus at Bathurst Library until 2023. It is now stored in climate-controlled conditions at the Central Tablelands Collections Facility.

The nominated collection includes books dating from 1700 with predominantly nineteenth century non-fiction / reference texts offering an emphasis on Australiana, indicative of the earlier, educational role performed by School of Arts institutions. The original non-lending collection owned by Bathurst Library has, at times, increased when original Bathurst School of Arts books were identified and added back into the non-lending collection. These books tend to be mid twentieth century fiction and nonfiction.

The collection includes a useful variety of catalogues created at various periods throughout its history, that for example detail the titles held in 1899 (called the "Main" collection) and those added between 1900 and 1907 (called the "Supplementary" collection). A stocktake of the collection after culling from 1982 also details the titles held (although this was found not to be an entirely accurate record of book now on the shelves).

The collection contains a number of valuable and important items in their own right including a 1792 publication featuring scenes of old Sydney Town by "Captain Hunter".

Important supporting documents found within the collection:

- Catalogue of the Bathurst Mechanic's School of Arts 1899: A dictionary of Authors, Subjects and Classes.
- Supplementary Catalogue of the Bathurst School of Arts for the Years 1899 to 1907 (inclusive) : Authors' names and names of books in alphabetical order.
- Original Bathurst School of Arts Minute Book (documenting the creation of the School of Arts and its library).
- Ledger of periodicals, magazines and reviews bound into volume. Commencing in 1895, final entry appears to be 1915.
- Stock Book No.3 Earliest entry is 1948. This book indicates the starting number for each section of the collection. Giving an indication of the size of the collection in the mid 1900s.
- School of Arts Visitors Book 1899-1913.
- Fees register (lists names of members of the Bathurst School of Arts).

At the front of the 1899 catalogue there is a section on the Rules of the Bathurst School of Arts Library. Within these rules there are sections headed "Librarian", "Books and Records", "Stock list", "Lost books", "Fines" 'Worn-out Books' and "New Books". There is also a chapter on Library By-Laws. These rules and by-laws together with the remaining minute book provide us with a guide to the way the library operated the principles behind the library.

Classification and arrangement of collection is:

- A-Travel &c.;
- B-Science
- C-Biography
- D-History
- E-Poetry and Drama
- F-Miscellaneous essays, Sports &c.;
- Ref Lib-Reference Library

Within each section of the original collection owned by Bathurst Library, a running number was allocated as books were added to the system.

=== Condition ===
The books were reported to be in good condition as at 17 May 2004. The climatic conditions have worked to the benefit of the collection. The district does not have a high humidity and the air conditioning at Bathurst Library was kept on 24 hours a day resulting in the collection being maintained at a constant temperature. The library had a pest control strategy operating. The area had poor lighting and was well away from natural light.

The Central Tablelands Collections Facility, at which the collection has been stored since 2023, is a building designed intentionally for standard storage with climate control for valuable and fragile collections, archives and other significant objects held in and galleries. The facilities collections staff are also experienced in pest treatment and preventative conservation.

The Interim CMS advises that the coherence of the collection should be conserved and it should not be expanded with any further acquisitions, that none of its books should be made available for loan, and that items should only be provided to the public under supervision. The CMS recommends preservation measures such as de-acidification and housing under controlled environmental conditions to maximise its lifespan.

The books are generally in good condition and housed under excellent conditions (low humidity, low levels of natural light, constant temperature) but some of the more rare and valuable items require more specific conservation work.

=== Modifications and dates ===
The School of Arts library was reported as numbering some 19,746 volumes in the financial year of 1913–1914, with 28,277 loans recorded in that year. The collection in 1956 when acquired by Bathurst City Library was probably even larger than this, so the present collection represents the results of a culling undertaken by the Bathurst City Library during the 1950s.

== Heritage listing ==
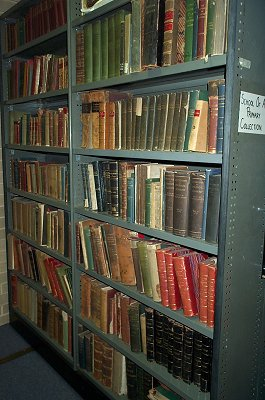
Some of the books

This moveable heritage collection of an estimated 2000 books is of State significance as the core collection of reference and historic books held by the Bathurst School of Arts between 1855 and 1956. The collection, dating from 1700 and with an emphasis on nineteenth century texts about Australia, includes rare and valuable volumes but also provides historic insights into the information available to the inhabitants of this major regional centre. The collection has research potential for scholars studying regional Australian history of the period, the School of Arts movement in NSW and the historical workings of local libraries.

Bathurst Old School of Arts Library Collection was listed on the New South Wales State Heritage Register on 22 October 2004 having satisfied the following criteria.

The place is important in demonstrating the course, or pattern, of cultural or natural history in New South Wales.

This collection of an estimated 2000 books is of State significance as the core collection of reference and historic books held by the Bathurst School of Arts between 1855 and 1956. The collection, dating from 1700 and with an emphasis on nineteenth century texts about Australia, includes rare and valuable volumes but also provides historic insights into the information available to the inhabitants of this major regional centre.

The place has a strong or special association with a person, or group of persons, of importance of cultural or natural history of New South Wales's history.

The collection has local significance for its associations with local citizens who founded and maintained the Bathurst School of Arts and its library collection. It also has local significance in relation to inscriptions and book plates associated with local citizens to be found on some of the volumes.

The place is important in demonstrating aesthetic characteristics and/or a high degree of creative or technical achievement in New South Wales.

The collection has high local aesthetic significance for containing a number of valuable and important books.

The place has a strong or special association with a particular community or cultural group in New South Wales for social, cultural or spiritual reasons.

The collection's high level of local social significance is evidenced by its nomination during the consultation undertaken during the State Heritage Listing project for the Central West.

The place has potential to yield information that will contribute to an understanding of the cultural or natural history of New South Wales.

The collection is of State significance for its research potential for scholars researching regional Australian history of the period, the School of Arts movement in NSW and the historical workings of local libraries.

The place possesses uncommon, rare or endangered aspects of the cultural or natural history of New South Wales.

The collection is of State significance for its rarity as a surviving collection of historic books from a major regional School of Arts library. Two other surviving School of Arts libraries found to be still operating in NSW in 2004 were the Sydney Mechanics Institute and the Casino School of Arts, which held predominantly recent, late twentieth century editions of fiction. The Carlton School of Arts disposed of its library collection in 1996. The old library collection of the Newtown School of Arts was found to be still stored on site but locked in a room with unknown contents. By comparison this is a rare collection of predominantly non-fiction / reference texts with an emphasis on Australiana, indicative of the earlier, educational role performed by School of Arts institutions.

The place is important in demonstrating the principal characteristics of a class of cultural or natural places/environments in New South Wales.

The collection is of State significance for its value as a surviving collection of books from a regional School of Arts library, which, enhanced by its various catalogues, is representative of the range of non-fiction and reference texts that were historically available in a major regional centre in NSW.
