= Kogarah =

Suburb of Sydney, New South Wales, Australia

- Suburb
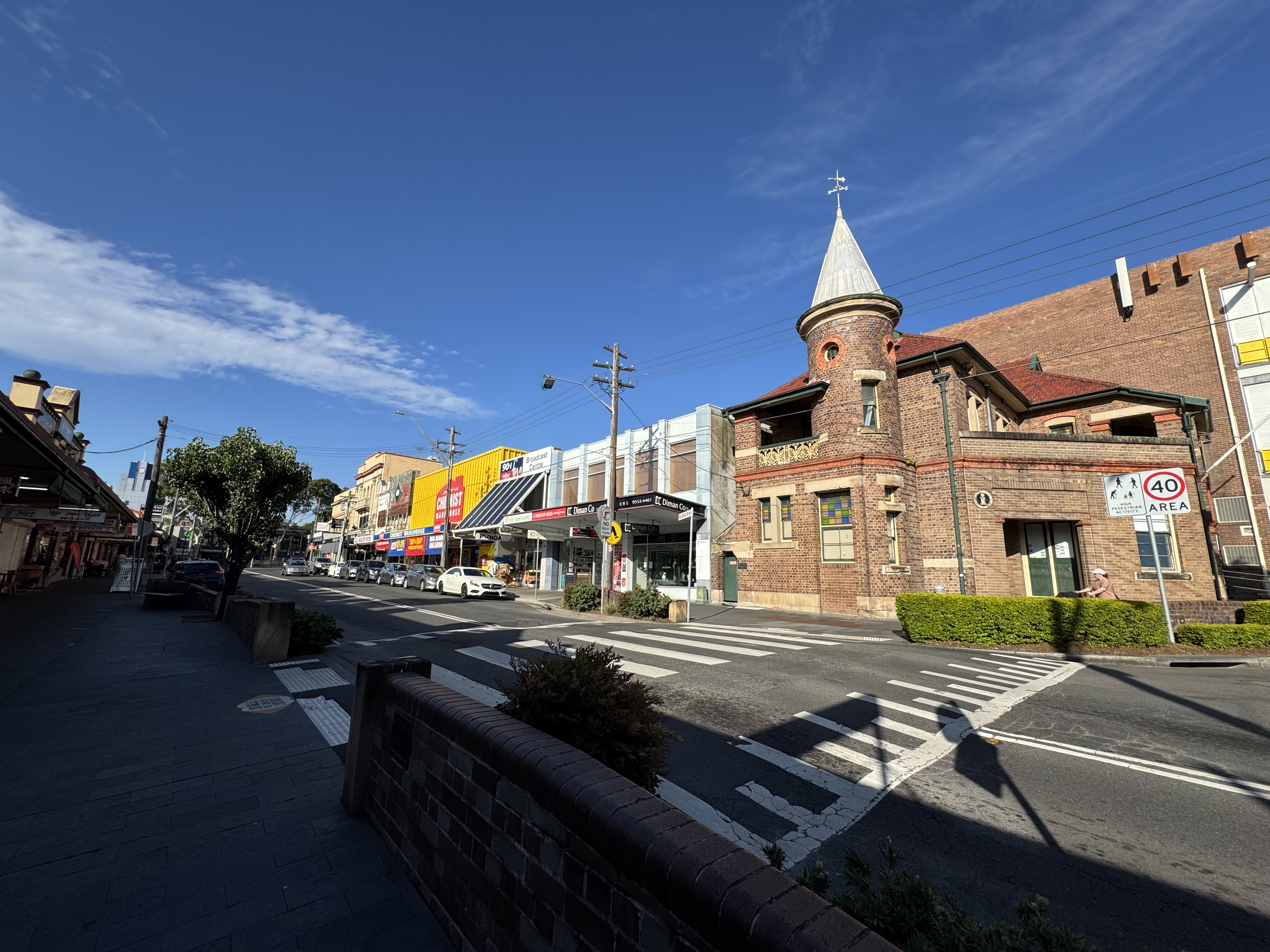
- Railway Parade, Kogarah

- Interactive map of Kogarah
- Country: Australia
- State: New South Wales
- City: Sydney
- LGAs: Georges River Council; Bayside Council
- Location: 14 km (8.7 mi) south-west of Sydney CBD
- Established: 1885

Government
  - State electorates: Kogarah; Rockdale
  - Federal division: Barton

Area
  - Total: 2.6 km^{2} (1.0 sq mi)
- Elevation: 29 m (95 ft)

Population
  - Total: 16,416 (2021 census)
  - Density: 6,310/km^{2} (16,350/sq mi)
- Postcode: 2217
Suburbs around Kogarah
Bexley	Rockdale	Brighton-Le-Sands
Carlton	Kogarah	Monterey
Kogarah Bay	Beverley Park	Ramsgate

Kogarah (/kɒɡərə/ or /kɒɡrə/) is a suburb of Southern Sydney, in the state of New South Wales, Australia. Kogarah is located 14 kilometres (9 miles) south of the Sydney central business district and is considered to be the centre of the St George area.

== Location ==
Kogarah took its name from Kogarah Bay, a small bay on the northern shore of the Georges River. The suburb originally stretched to the bay but has since been divided up to form the separate suburbs of Kogarah Bay and Beverley Park.

Kogarah has a mixture of residential, commercial and light industrial areas. It is also known for its large number of schools (including primary school, high school and tertiary education) and health care services (including two hospitals and many medical centres). The NRL side, St George Illawarra Dragons have their Sydney office based at nearby Jubilee Oval, often referred to as Kogarah Oval. Kogarah features all types of residential developments from low density detached houses, to medium density flats and high density high-rise apartments.

== History ==
Railway Parade in 1915. The former Kogarah Post Office on the right was built in 1892 and is now a community centre

The name 'Kogarah' is derived from an Aboriginal word meaning rushes or place of reeds. It had also been written as 'Coggera', 'Cogerah' and 'Kuggerah' but the current spelling was settled when the railway line came through the area in the 1880s.

Early land grants in the area were made to John Townson (1760–1835) who received 910 hectares (2,250 acres) from 1808 to 1810, centred on Hurstville and James Chandler, whose neighbouring estate was centred on Bexley. The district provided fruit, vegetables and oysters for Sydney. In 1869, St Paul's Church of England opened on Rocky Point Road (now Princes Highway). It was built on 0.81 hectares (2 acres) of land given to the church by William Wolfen the Swedish Consul to Sydney, who owned 320 hectares (800 acres) in Kogarah. The suburb grew around the church and the Gardeners Arms Hotel. Kogarah became a municipality in 1885.

The former neighbourhood of Moorefield is now part of Kogarah. It was originally a 24-hectare (60-acre) land grant from Governor Lachlan Macquarie in 1812 to Patrick Moore, who built a fine house there. The Moorefield racecourse built by a descendant opened in 1888. Brigadier General John Lamrock CB VD was appointed secretary of the Moorefield Race Club in 1912 and remained in that position until early in 1935. The Moorefield estate was subdivided in the 1950s and the Department of Education purchased 7.7 hectares (19 acres), where it built two high schools and college of further education. Moorefields Girls High School was erected there in 1955 on the former site of Moore's farm.

== Heritage listing ==
Toomevara Lane Chinese Market Gardens is a heritage listed site in Kogarah.

== Demographics ==
Historical population
Year	Pop.	±%
2001	10,843	—
2006	11,715	+8.0%
2011	12,764	+9.0%
2016	15,124	+18.5%
2021	16,416	+8.5%

According to the 2021 Australian Bureau of Statistics Census of Population, there were 16,416 people in Kogarah. 36.3% of people were born in Australia. The next most common countries of birth were Nepal 11.3%, China 8.2%, India 6.0%, the Philippines 3.9% and Bangladesh 2.9%. 30.4% of people only spoke English at home. Other languages spoken at home included Nepali 11.6%, Mandarin 7.8%, Cantonese 5.3%, Greek 4.8% and Bengali 3.7%. The most common responses for religious affiliation were No Religion 22.7%, Catholic 17.8%, Hinduism 16.8% and Eastern Orthodox 9.5%.

== Notable people ==
- Jude Bargwanna – racing driver
- Dave Brown – rugby league star of the 1930s was born in Kogarah
- Ray Burton – singer and songwriter
- Rev Dr Rowland Croucher – theologian and author, lived in Warialda Street in the early years of married life while he was a staffworker with the InterVarsity Fellowship. His wife Jan taught at Kogarah High School
- Reg Gasnier – rugby league legend lived in Kogarah
- Clive James – writer, poet, essayist, critic and commentator on popular culture was born and raised in Kogarah
- Sam Konstas – Test cricketer
- Ronald Sharp – organ builder was born in Kogarah
- Kenneth Slessor – one of Australia's greatest poets, attended Kogarah Primary School, in the early 20th century. The family lived in Belgrave Street, according to his biographer, Geoffrey Dutton
- Steve Smith – former captain of Australia national cricket team, was born and raised in Kogarah
- Henry Thornton – cricketer, was born and raised in Kogarah
- Brandon Wakeham – rugby league player, was born and raised in Kogarah

== Transportation ==
Kogarah railway station is served by Sydney Trains T4 line services.

The Princes Highway is the main road through Kogarah.

== Schools and churches ==
=== Schools ===
- Kogarah Public School
- Kogarah High School
- James Cook Boys Technology High School
- Moorefield Girls High School
- St Declan’s Catholic Primary School
- St George Girls High School
- St Patrick's Primary School (co-ed)
- Marist College Kogarah (boys, secondary)
- Sydney Institute of TAFE: St. George Campus

=== Churches ===
- Resurrection of Christ Greek Orthodox Church
- Grace Chinese Christian Church
- Kogarah Soldiers' Memorial Presbyterian Church (Kirkplace)
- St Patrick's Catholic Church
- St Paul's Anglican Church
- Christ Church St George (Anglican), and Church in the Bank (Anglican)
- Christ Living Church (Indonesian Church)
- Kogarah Uniting Church
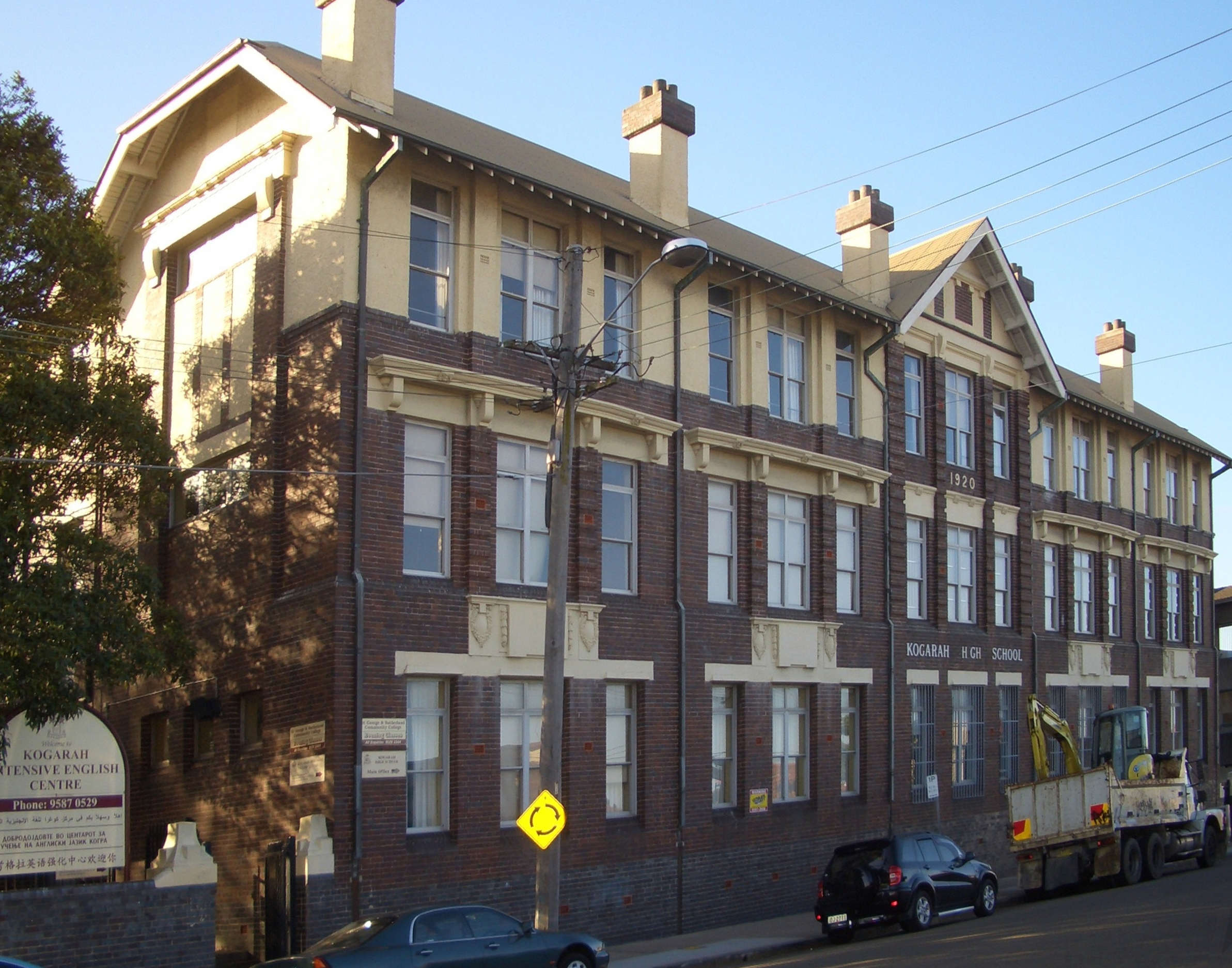
Kogarah High School

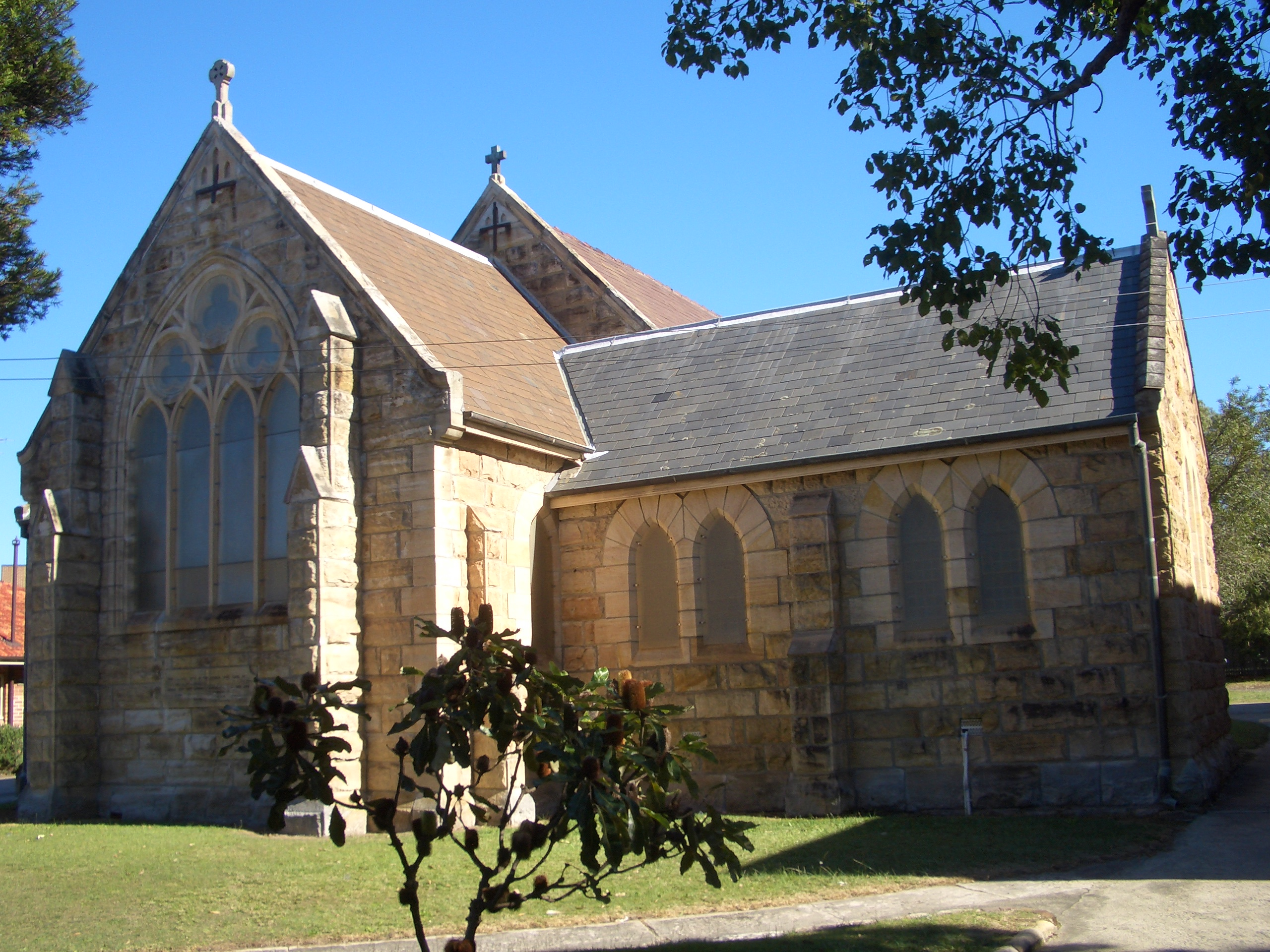
St Paul's Anglican Church

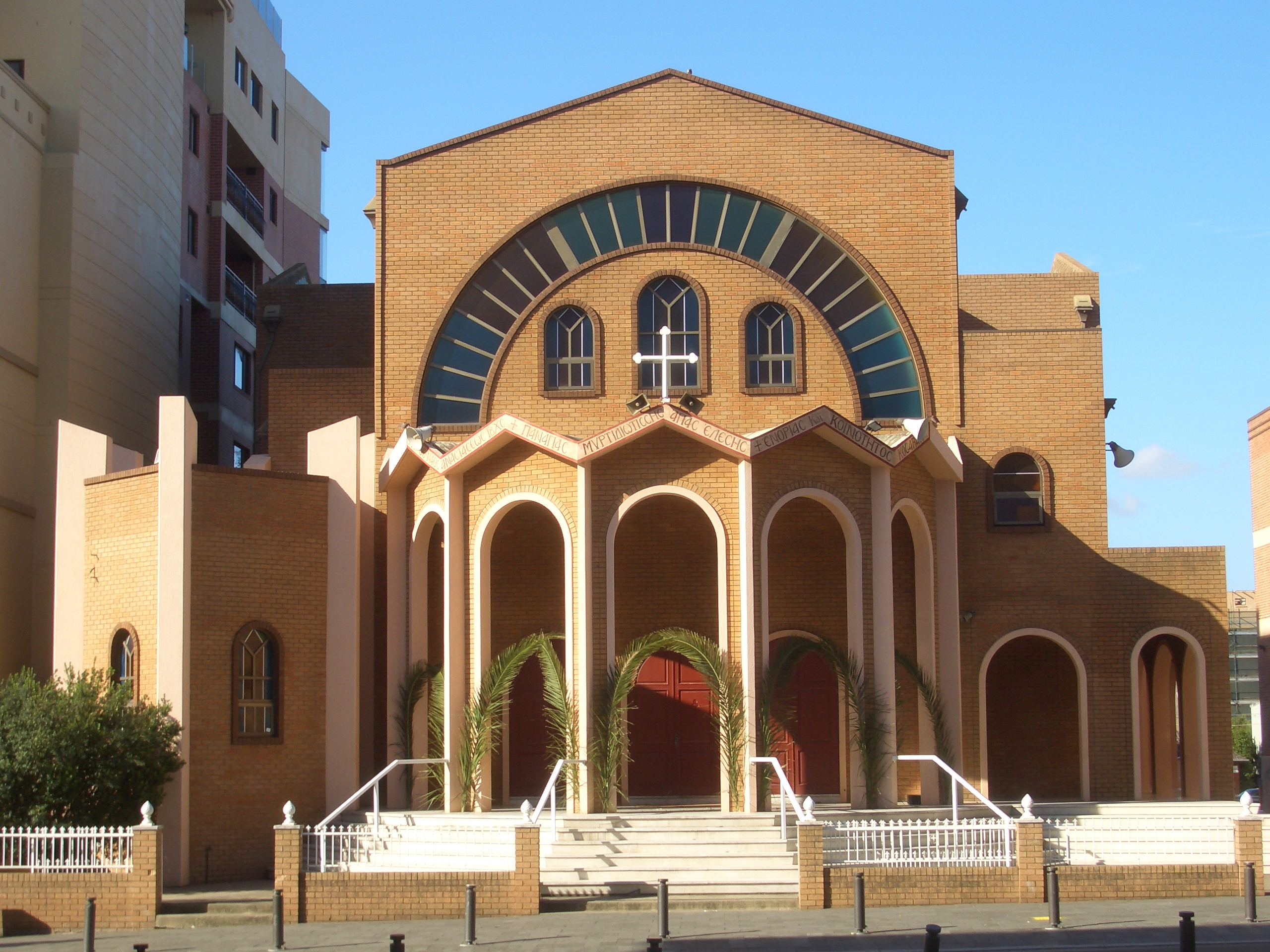
Resurrection of Christ Greek Orthodox Church
