= 2024 Georges River Council election =

- 14 September 2024

All 15 seats on Georges River Council 8 seats needed for a majority
- Registered: 96,882
- Turnout: 86.1%

	First party	Second party	Third party
		R&R
Party	Labor	GRRRP	Liberal
Last election	5 seats	4 seats	5 seats
Seats before	5	4	3
Seats won	6	5	3
Seat change	▲1	▲1	▼2
Primary vote	30,247	24,389	16,281
Percentage	39.1%	31.5%	21.0%
Swing	▲6.7	▲10.1	▼8.0

The 2024 Georges River Council election was held on 14 September 2024 to elect 15 councillors to the Georges River Council. The election was held as part of the statewide local government elections in New South Wales.

The Labor Party won six seats, two short of a majority, while the Georges River Residents and Ratepayers Party (GRRRP) won five. The Liberal Party won three seats but lost 8% of its council-wide vote, owing to a missed candidate nomination deadline which prevented some of its councillors from recontesting.

== Background ==
Blakehurst Ward councillor Sam Elmir and Mortdale Ward councillor Nick Smerdely were expelled from the Liberal Party in December 2022.

Two Labor councillors – Warren Tegg (Mortdale) and Kevin Greene (Peakhurst) – resigned at various points in 2022 and were replaced by Ashvini Ambihaipahar and Veronica Ficarra respectively following countbacks.

== Electoral system ==
Like in all other New South Wales local government areas (LGAs), Georges River Council elections use optional preferential voting. Under this system, voters are only required to vote for one candidate or group, although they can choose to preference other candidates.

All elections for councillor positions are elected using proportional representation. Georges River has an Australian Senate-style ballot paper with above-the-line and below-the-line voting. The council is divided into five wards, each electing three councillors.

The election was conducted by the New South Wales Electoral Commission (NSWEC).

== Retiring councillors ==
=== Independents ===
- Sam Elmir (Blakehurst)
- Nick Smerdely (Mortdale) – announced 9 August 2024

== Candidates ==
On 14 August 2024, the day that candidates nominations closed, the Liberal Party revealed they had missed the deadline to nominate 164 candidates in 16 different LGAs. This included all Liberal candidates in Mortdale Ward and Peakhurst Ward.

This was the only council contested by the Public Education Party in 2024.

=== Blakehurst ===
Labor (Group A)	Liberal (Group B)	GRRRP (Group C)
1. Kathryn Landsberry; 2. Anastasia Polites; 3. Sarina Foulstone	1. Oliver Dimoski; 2. James Brown; 3. Elizabeth Taylor	1. Natalie Mort; 2. Nicole Hawick; 3. Mary Cassimatis

=== Hurstville ===
GRRRP (Group A)	GRA (Group B)	Liberal (Group C)	Labor (Group D)
1. Bob Jones; 2. Max Brightwell; 3. Rachel Zhang	1. Ben Wang; 2. Rhanda Taouk; 3. Kamal Sigdel; 4. Jun Qi	1. Nancy Liu; 2. Rahul Nand; 3. Binjie Lu	1. Leon Pun; 2. Jenny Vu; 3. David Crewdson

=== Kogarah Bay ===
Labor (Group A)	Liberal (Group B)	KRA (Group C)	Libertarian (Group D)	GRRRP (Group E)
1. Thomas Gao; 2. Emilija Beljic; 3. Mike Warner	1. Sam Stratikopoulos; 2. Bingxing Sheng; 3. James Skibinski	1. Leesha Payor; 2. Petra Herzog; 3. Vicki Poole	1. Vicky Nicodemou; 2. Sophia Constantine; 3. Sandra Bremner	1. Sandra Bremner; 2. Heidi Breeze; 3. Christopher Tofalakis

=== Mortdale ===
Labor (Group A)	GRRRP (Group B)	Ungrouped
1. Ash Ambihaipahar; 2. Tom Arthur; 3. Gerard Hayes	1. Christina Jamieson; 2. Alexandra Fleming; 3. Deborah Mackie	Peter Eccleston (Greens); Christian Stojkov (Ind); Glen Stelzer (PEP)

=== Peakhurst ===
Labor (Group A)	GRRRP (Group B)
1. Elaina Anzellotti; 2. Karno Gangopadhyay; 3. Peter Gayton	1. Peter Mahoney; 2. Matthew Allison; 3. Sonia Baxant

=== Withdrawn candidates ===
Party	Candidate	Ward	Details
Liberal	Andrew Ng	Mortdale	Candidate unable to contest because of missed nomination deadline.
Liberal	Lou Konjarski	Peakhurst	Incumbent councillor unable to recontest because of missed candidacy deadline.

== Results ==
=== Ward results ===
2024 Georges River Council election: Ward results
Party	Votes	%	Swing	Seats	Change
Labor	30,247	39.06	+6.66	6	▲1
Residents and Ratepayers	24,389	31.49	+10.09	5	▲1
Liberal	16,281	21.02	−7.98	3	▼2
Georges River Association	3,607	4.66	+1.96	1	Steady
Kogarah Residents' Association	1,065	1.38	+1.38	0	Steady
Libertarian	553	0.71	+0.71	0	Steady
Greens	474	0.61	+0.61	0	Steady
Public Education	82	0.11	+0.11	0	Steady
Independents	741	0.96	−12.34	0	Steady
Formal votes	77,439	92.9			
Informal votes	5,928	7.1			
Total	83,367	100.0		15	
Registered voters / turnout	96,882	86.1			

=== Blakehurst ===
2024 Georges River Council election: Blakehurst Ward
Party	Candidate	Votes	%	±%
Liberal	1. Oliver Dimoski (elected 1); 2. James Brown; 3. Elizabeth Taylor	7,030	43.38	+11.68
Labor	1. Kathryn Landsberry (elected 2); 2. Anastasia Polites; 3. Sarina Foulstone	4,888	30.16	+5.56
Residents and Ratepayers	1. Natalie Mort (elected 3); 2. Nicole Hawick; 3. Mary Cassimatis	4,289	26.46	−0.04
Total formal votes		16,207	95.37	
Informal votes		787	4.63	
Turnout		16,994	86.46	

=== Hurstville ===
2024 Georges River Council election: Hurstville Ward
Party	Candidate	Votes	%	±%
Labor	1. Leon Pun (elected 1); 2. Jenny Vu; 3. Jenny Crewdson	4,879	32.88	+2.68
Liberal	1. Nancy Liu (elected 2); 2. Rahul Nand; 3. Binjie Lu	4,167	28.08	+3.88
Georges River Association	1. Ben Wang (elected 3); 2. Rhanda Taouk; 3. Kamal Sigdel; 4. Jun Qi	3,607	24.31	+10.11
Residents and Ratepayers	1. Bob Jones; 2. Max Brightwell; 3. Rachel Zhang	2,185	14.73	+3.83
Total formal votes		14,838	92.08	
Informal votes		1,276	7.92	
Turnout		16,114	86.09	

=== Kogarah Bay ===
2024 Georges River Council election: Kogarah Bay Ward
Party	Candidate	Votes	%	±%
Labor	1. Thomas Gao (elected 1); 2. Emilija Beljic; 3. Mike Warner	6,557	40.54	+11.04
Liberal	1. Sam Stratikopoulos (elected 2); 2. Bingxing Sheng; 3. James Skibinski	5,084	31.43	+8.23
Residents and Ratepayers	1. Elise Borg (elected 3); 2. Heidi Breeze; 3. Christopher Tofalakis	2,916	18.03	−5.27
Kogarah Residents' Association	1. Leesha Payor; 2. Petra Herzog; 3. Vicki Poole	1,065	6.58	+0.78
Libertarian	1. Vicky Nicodemou; 2. Sophia Constantine; 3. Sandra Bremner	553	3.42	+3.42
Total formal votes		16,175	92.83	
Informal votes		1,250	7.17	
Turnout		17,425	84.61	

=== Mortdale ===
2024 Georges River Council election: Mortdale Ward
Party	Candidate	Votes	%	±%
Labor	1. Ash Ambihaipahar (elected 1); 2. Tom Arthur (elected 3); 3. Gerard Hayes	6,723	47.18	+ 12.18
Residents and Ratepayers	1. Christina Jamieson (elected 2); 2. Alexandra Fleming; 3. Deborah Mackie	6,229	43.72	+22.62
Independent	Christian Stojkov	741	5.20	+4.6
Greens	Peter Eccleston	474	3.33	+3.33
Public Education	Glen Stelzer	82	0.58	+0.58
Total formal votes		14,249	92.03	
Informal votes		1,234	7.97	
Turnout		15,483	86.33	

=== Peakhurst ===
2024 Georges River Council election: Peakhurst Ward
Party	Candidate	Votes	%	±%
Residents and Ratepayers	1. Peter Mahoney (elected 1); 2. Matthew Allison (elected 3); 3. Sonia Baxant	8,770	54.92	+30.42
Labor	1. Elaina Anzellotti (elected 2); 2. Karno Gangopadhyay; 3. Peter Gayton	7,200	45.08	+2.58
Total formal votes		15,970	92.04	
Informal votes		1,381	7.96	
Turnout		17,351	86.85	
