= Toomevara Lane Chinese Market Gardens =

- Location within New South Wales Location within Australia
- 33.9711°S 151.1422°E
- Location: Toomevara Lane, Kogarah, Bayside Council, New South Wales, Australia

Site notes
- Owner: Department of Planning and Infrastructure; Department of Planning and Infrastructure

New South Wales Heritage Register
- Official name: Toomevara Lane Chinese Market Gardens; Rockdale Market gardens; Chinese Market Gardens
- Type: state heritage (landscape)
- Designated: 2 April 1999
- Reference no.: 1394
- Type: Market Garden
- Category: Farming and Grazing

Toomevara Lane Chinese Market Gardens is a heritage-listed market garden at Toomevara Lane, Kogarah, Bayside Council, New South Wales, Australia. It is also known as Rockdale Market Gardens and Chinese Market Gardens. It was added to the New South Wales State Heritage Register on 2 April 1999.

== History ==
The site demonstrates prolonged and continuous use as a market garden. Market gardens such as this played an important role in food production for the local and regional community, particularly during the Great Depression and Post and Inter-War periods. For much of the Great Depression, Chinese market gardens were the only source of fresh vegetables for urban dwelling Australians.

== Description ==
A remnant market garden with associated asbestos cement building and corrugated iron outbuildings. The building sits on brick piers and has a gabled corrugated iron roof. The associated corrugated iron sheds are in a reasonable condition. The garden is divided into small strips, each of which has a different type of produce under cultivation.

The site is surrounded by housing and open space/playing fields.

As at 26 March 1999, the site consists of a market garden, under production, and an associated asbestos cement building, in reasonable repair. The site has some archaeological potential associated with its use as a market garden.

In the context of an area which has been under cultivation for a century, the landscape appears to be intact. The associated buildings also appear to be intact but are generally in poor condition.

== Heritage listing ==
The three market garden properties are of State significance for a number of reasons, but their primary importance is their continuous use for market gardening since at least the 1850s. This has resulted in the creation of a landscape that bears evidence of continuous work and the marketing of the changes that have taken place in the market gardening industry in that time. Evidence of this is present in built fabric, changes in ethnicity of occupants and the complexity of infrastructure. Their rarity has been further enhanced by ongoing changes to surrounding environments including urban re-development that absorbed the majority of surviving market gardens in the mid and late 20th century. They are rare survivors of the mid 19th century use of the area for market gardening.

Outwardly the market gardens are a timeless scene with little intrusion by modern technology, which creates a semblance of their former appearance. They are representative of market gardens throughout the 19th and 20th centuries. Their appearance and contribution to their settings is significant as a reminder of the area's long use for market gardening. The landscapes are strongly patterned, aesthetically pleasing and provide a transition between urban development and the renaturalised areas of the Botany lowlands.

The Toomevara Lane Market Gardens are of State significance as one of only five surviving market gardens in the Sydney metropolitan region in largely their original form and still employing traditional cultivation practices. The site is of significance for its association with the Chinese, German, Irish and Cornish communities and for its demonstration of a continuing pattern of land usage since the mid-19th century market gardener's cottages in the Sydney metropolitan region and one of only four such cottages still attached to operating market gardens.

The property is of State significance for its continuous use as a market garden since the land was first alienated for that purpose in the 1860s. It retains a strongly functional landscape reflecting both the long history of market gardening and operation that is typical of modern farming methods.

The current use of the place is consistent with its significance and contributing to the continuity of use of the property. The scale of the property, the working largely by hand, the "making do" and recycling of fabric and general air of under-resourced functionality are essential aspects of the property's significance. Modern intrusions, notably motor cars and electricity, are acceptable changes that have been adopted as opportunity has risen.

The Toomevara Lane Market Garden has some local significance for its associations, notably

- Peter Herrmann and his family, who were prominent market gardeners in Sydney in the mid to late 19th century and amongst the first German immigrants to take up market gardening of Sydney
- Peter Henry Wright, who operated the market garden from 1875 to 1890, one of the longest single ownership tenures in market gardening at the time.
- James O'Meara and the O'Meara family who owned the site from 1899 to 1960, the longest period of ownership in the site's history
- John Wilson (the original grantee) and John Hart, his solicitor, who started the market garden in 1866.

Bordering wetland is of local significance as fish and bird breeding habitat.

Immediate surrounding development and parkland diminishes the aesthetic and evocative landscape character that the other properties retain. The neighbouring land uses provide management challenges through trespass and noise that compromise the sensory experience.

Toomevara Lane Chinese Market Gardens was listed on the New South Wales State Heritage Register on 2 April 1999.
