= Beverley Park, New South Wales =

Beverley Park
- Suburb
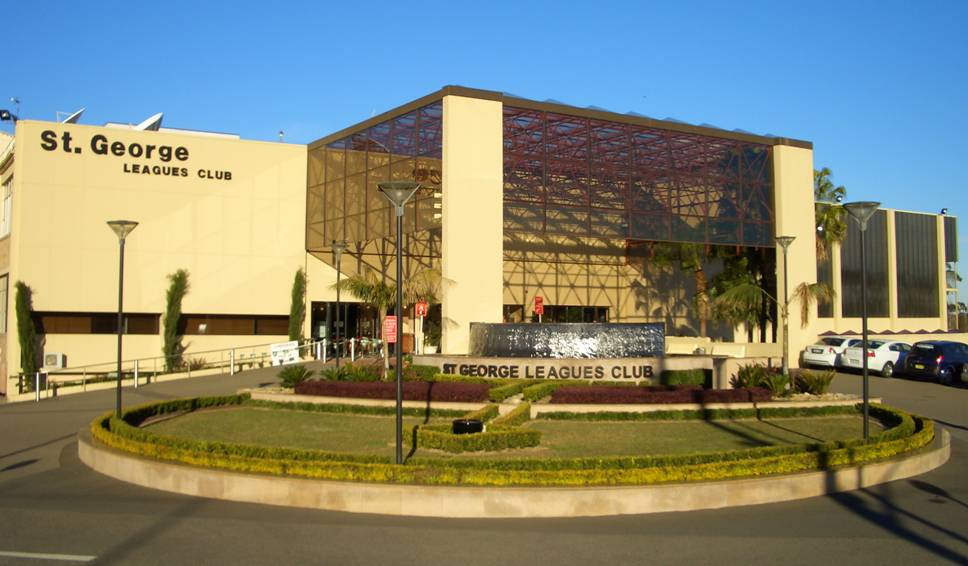
- St George Leagues Club

- Interactive map of Beverley Park
- Coordinates: 33°58′44″S 151°07′43″E
- Country: Australia
- State: New South Wales
- City: Sydney
- LGA: Georges River Council
- Location: 15 km (9.3 mi) south of Sydney CBD

Government
  - State electorate: Rockdale
  - Federal division: Barton
- Elevation: 8 m (26 ft)

Population
  - Total: 2,646 (SAL 2021)
- Postcode: 2217
Suburbs around Beverley Park
| Carlton | Kogarah | Kogarah |
| Carlton | Beverley Park | Ramsgate |
| Kogarah Bay | Kogarah Bay | Sans Souci |

Beverley Park is a suburb in southern Sydney, in the state of New South Wales, Australia. Beverley Park is located 15 kilometres south of the Sydney central business district, in the Georges River Council and is part of the St George area.

Beverley Park is surrounded by the suburbs Kogarah Bay, Carlton, Kogarah, Ramsgate and Sans Souci. It is a predominantly residential area around a large recreational area, Beverley Park Golf Course. It has a few commercial developments scattered along its borders on the Princes Highway and Rocky Point Road.

== History ==
Beverley Park and Kogarah Bay were originally part of the suburb of Kogarah. The area had been originally known as Townson's Bay and then Koggorah. Kogarah and Kogarah Bay were completely separated from each other by the creation of this new suburb. The suburb took its name from the large recreational park, which includes the Beverley Park Golf Course.

Sunnyside is a historic sandstone house on the corner of Princes Highway and Lacey Street, which was originally the home of Matthew Carroll, who owned 179 acres on both sides of the swampy headland of Kogarah bay. A Church of England rectory in the 1930s and a private kindergarten and primary school from 1948. It was sold in 1958 and converted into a rooming house until 1993 when it became a private residence again.

== Demographics ==
According to the 2021 census, there were 2,646 people usually resident in Beverley Park. 59.9% of residents stated they were born in Australia; 16.6% of residents stated they were born overseas with the top countries of birth being China (excluding Special Administrative Regions and Taiwan) 6.8%, Greece 5.2%, Lebanon 1.6%, Egypt 1.6% and North Macedonia 1.4%. English was stated as the only language spoken at home by 48.5% of residents and the next most common languages spoken were Greek 14.3%, Arabic 5.8%, Cantonese 4.3%, Mandarin 4.2%, Mandarin 4.2% and Macedonian 3.0%. The most common responses for religious affiliation were Catholic 26.6%, Orthodox 23.7%, No Religion 17.6% and Anglican 5.9%, a further 6.8% of respondents elected not to disclose their religion.

== Sport and recreation ==
The St George Leagues Club is located on Princes Highway. Beverley Park Golf Club covers a large percentage of this suburb's area.

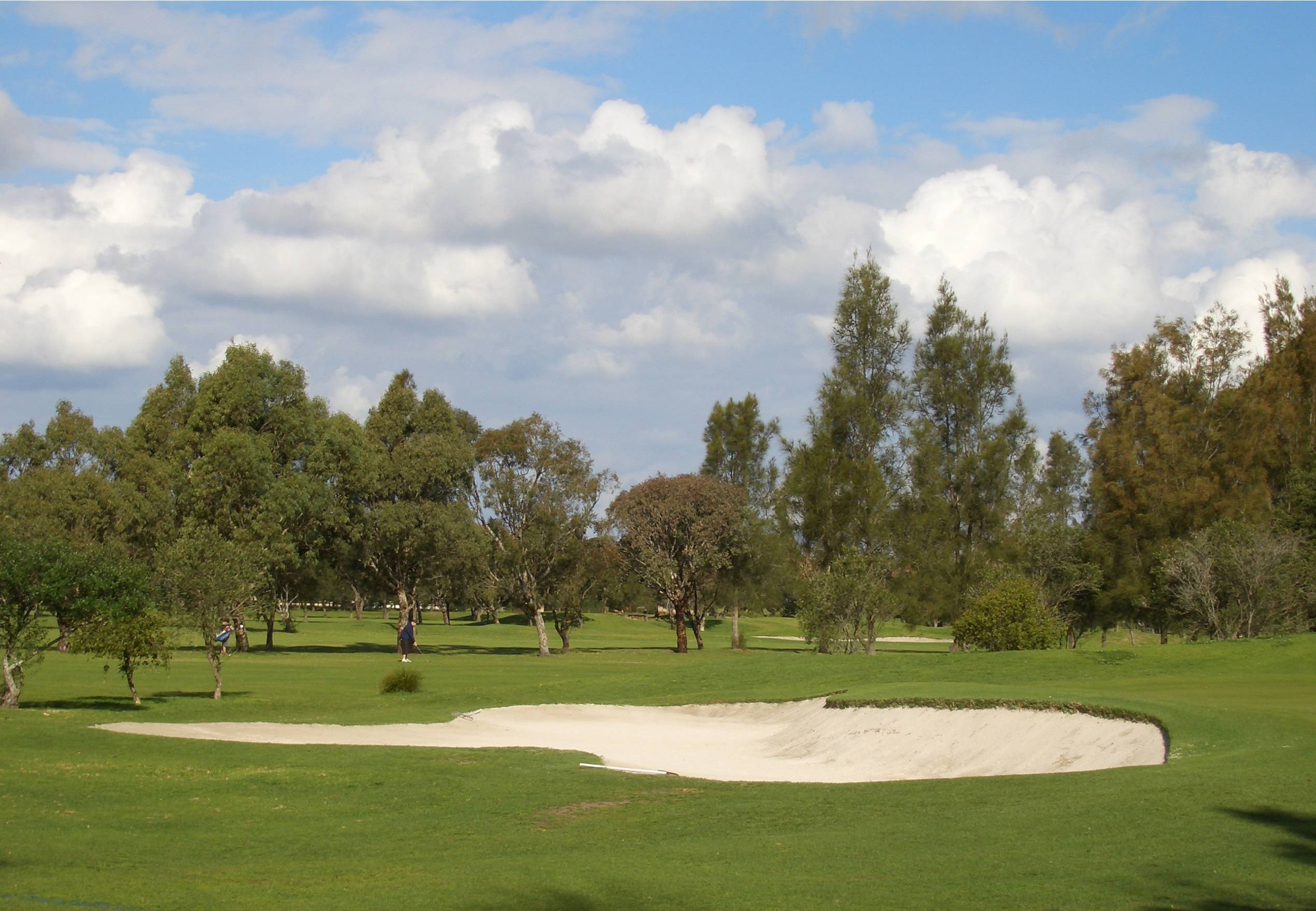
Beverley Park Golf Course

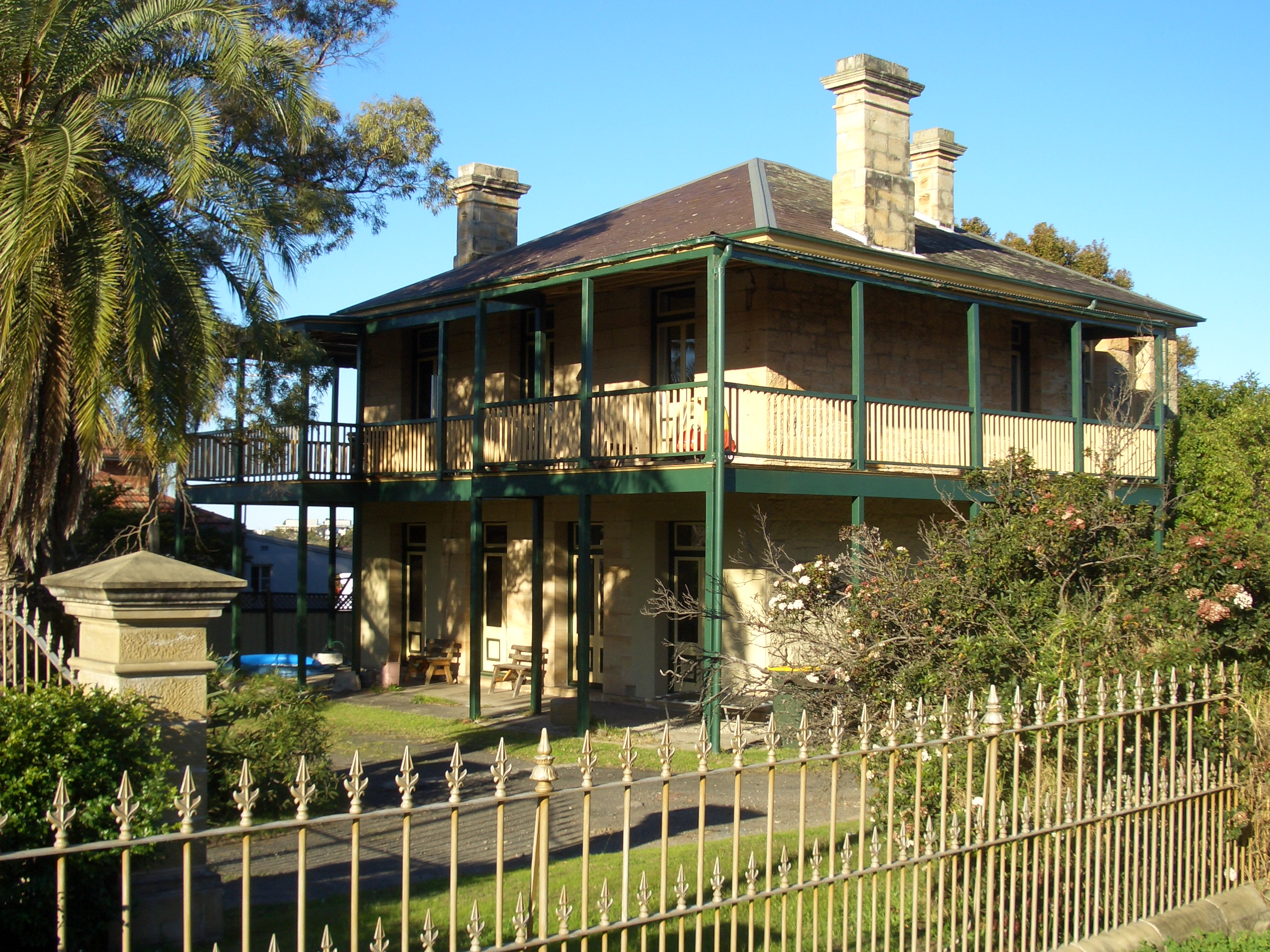
Sunnyside, Princes Highway
