= Carlton, New South Wales =

Carlton
- Suburb
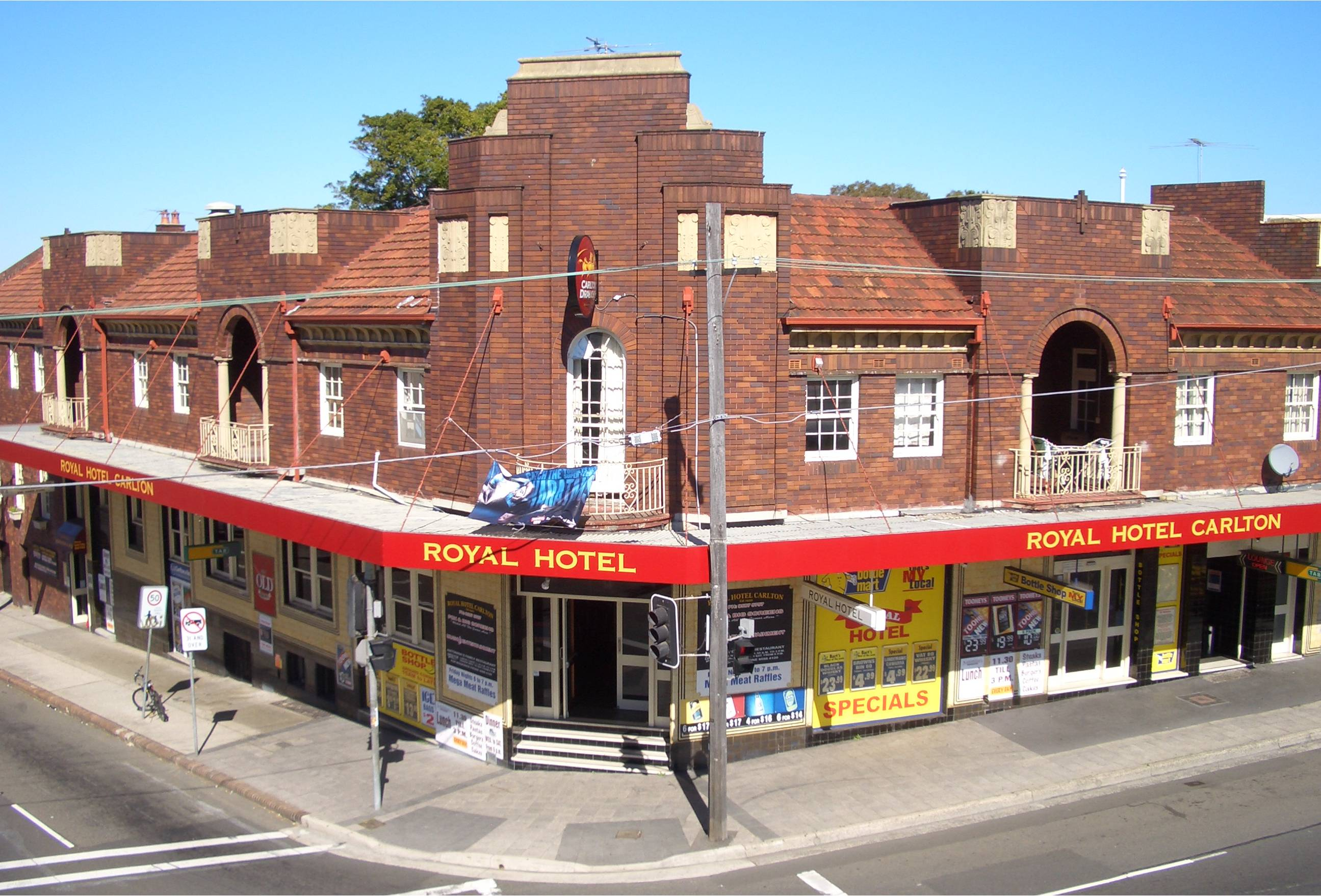
- Royal Hotel, Railway Parade

- Interactive map of Carlton
- Coordinates: 33°58′16″S 151°07′28″E
- Country: Australia
- State: New South Wales
- City: Sydney
- LGAs: Bayside Council; Georges River Council
- Location: 15 km (9.3 mi) south of Sydney CBD
- Established: 1886

Government
  - State electorate: Kogarah
  - Federal division: Barton
- Elevation: 39 m (128 ft)

Population
  - Total: 10,631 (2021 census)
- Postcode: 2218
Suburbs around Carlton
Hurstville	Bexley	Kogarah
Allawah	Carlton	Kogarah Bay
Blakehurst	Carss Park	Beverley Park

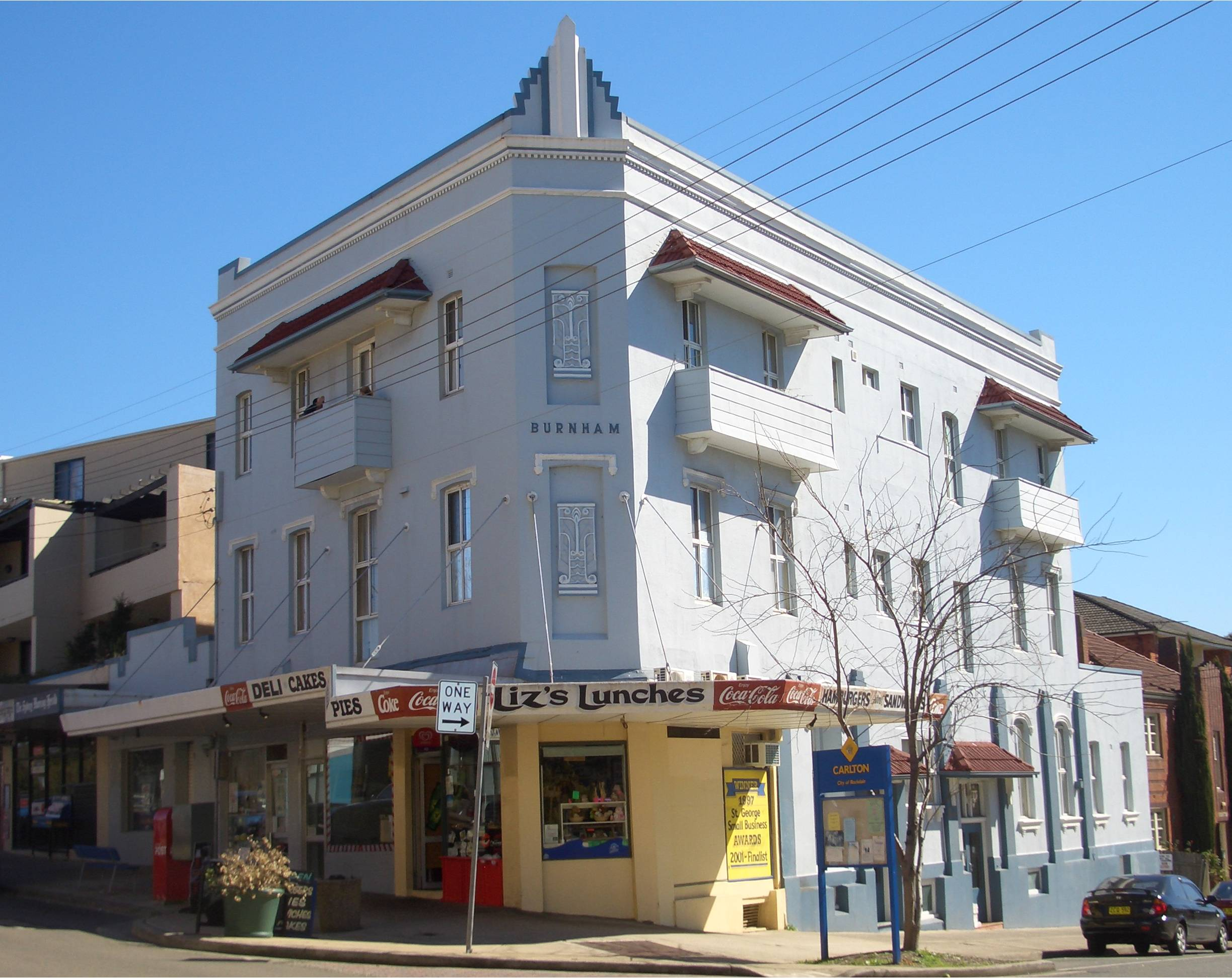
Carlton Parade, Carlton

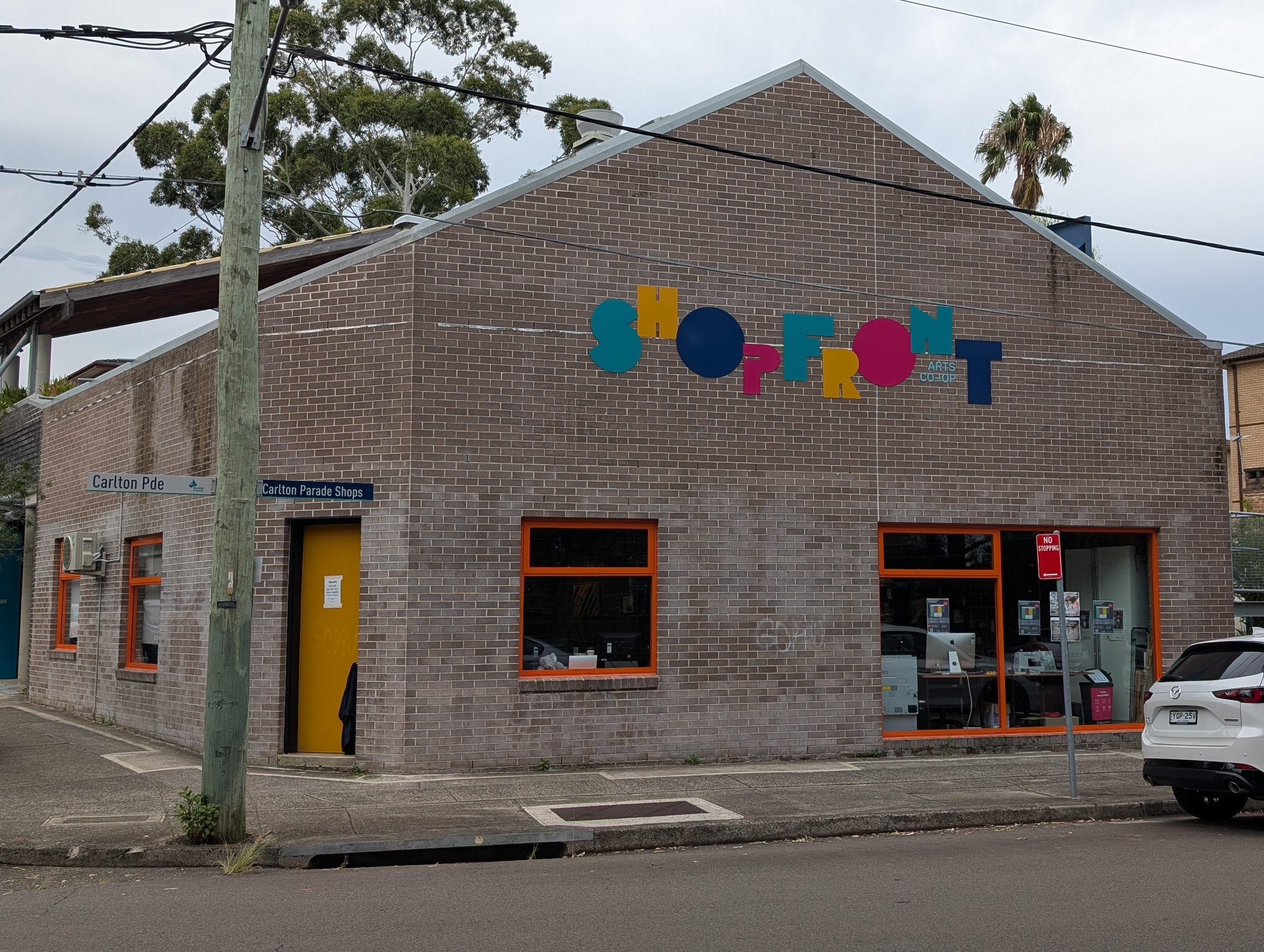
Shopfront Arts Co-op, Carlton Parade

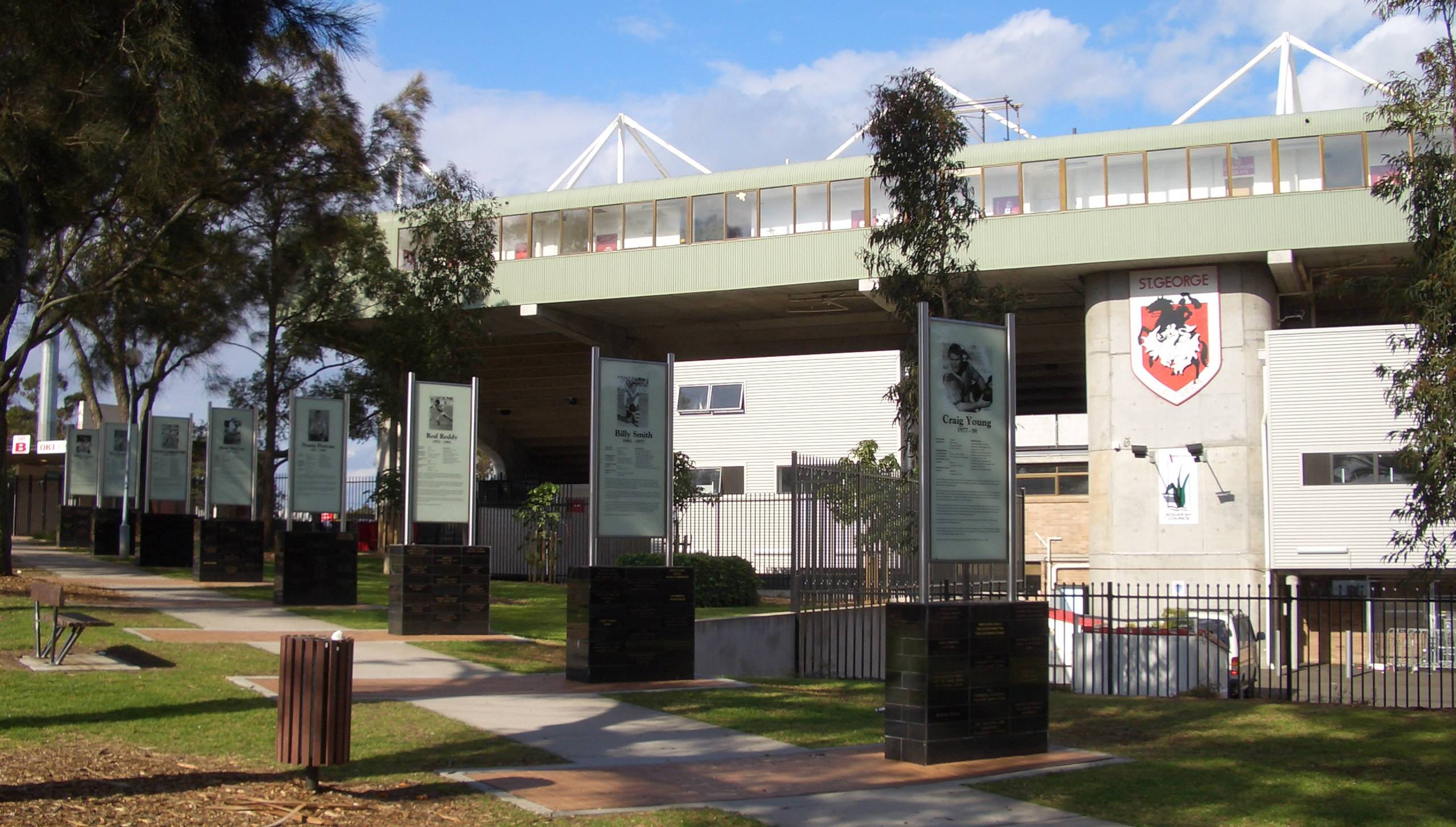
Jubilee Stadium and Walk of Fame, Park Street

Carlton is a suburb in southern Sydney, in the state of New South Wales, Australia. Carlton is located 15 kilometres south of the Sydney central business district and is part of the St George area. Carlton lies across the boundary of two local government areas, the Georges River Council and the Bayside Council.

== History ==
The area was originally heavily timbered. Carlton was part of a grant of 1,950 acres (7.9 km^{2}) made to Captain John Townson in 1808. The grant extended from King Georges Road and Stoney Creek Road to beyond Kogarah railway station. When the railway line to Hurstville was opened in 1884, large estates were subdivided and residents began moving in. However, there was no platform at Carlton until 1889. Landholders were given a block of land free if they contributed 400 pounds to finance the construction of the platform and station buildings. They were also guaranteed a first class ticket to Sydney for one year.

== Transport ==
Carlton railway station is on the Illawarra railway line of the Sydney Trains network. Limited bus services also run throughout Carlton, such as those provided by U-Go Mobility.

The Princes Highway, a major road in Southern Sydney, runs through Carlton.

== Parks and recreation ==
Parks located in Carlton are: Kogarah Park, Tinsdale Reserve, Anglo Square Park and Augusta Park.

Carlton is home to the St George Illawarra Dragons National Rugby League team. The St George home ground is located on Jubilee Avenue, and is known as Netstrata Jubilee Stadium (formerly known as Jubilee Oval). The Walk of Fame featuring St George legends is located in Park Street. The St George Leagues Club is located nearby on Princes Highway.

Shopfront Arts Co-op on Carlton Parade is a co-operative youth arts organisation owned completely by young people aged 8 to 25 with an international reputation that has made Australian and overseas tours. It was founded by Errol Bray and Garry Fry in 1976.

== Demographics ==
According to the 2021 Census, there were 10,631 residents in Carlton, with a median age of 38. 45.3% of people were born in Australia. The next most common countries of birth were China (excludes SARs and Taiwan) 11.3%, Nepal 5.5%, North Macedonia 3.0%, Philippines 2.9% and Greece 2.4%. 36% of people spoke only English at home. Other languages spoken at home included Mandarin 10.6%, Cantonese 7.8%, Greek 6.0%, Nepali 5.7% and Arabic 5.1%. The most common responses for religion were No Religion, so described 27.7%. Catholic 18.0% and Eastern Orthodox 13.6%, Islam 7.7% and Hinduism 6.6%.

== Schools ==
Carlton has two schools: Carlton Public School and Carlton South Public School.

== Places of worship ==
Churches in Carlton are:

- St Bernadette's Catholic Church, Carlton Uniting Church, Carlton Kogarah Baptist Church, Carlton Methodist Church, Park Road Anglican Church
- Park Road Anglican Church is on the corner of Park Road and Colvin Avenue.
