= Carss Park =

- Suburb
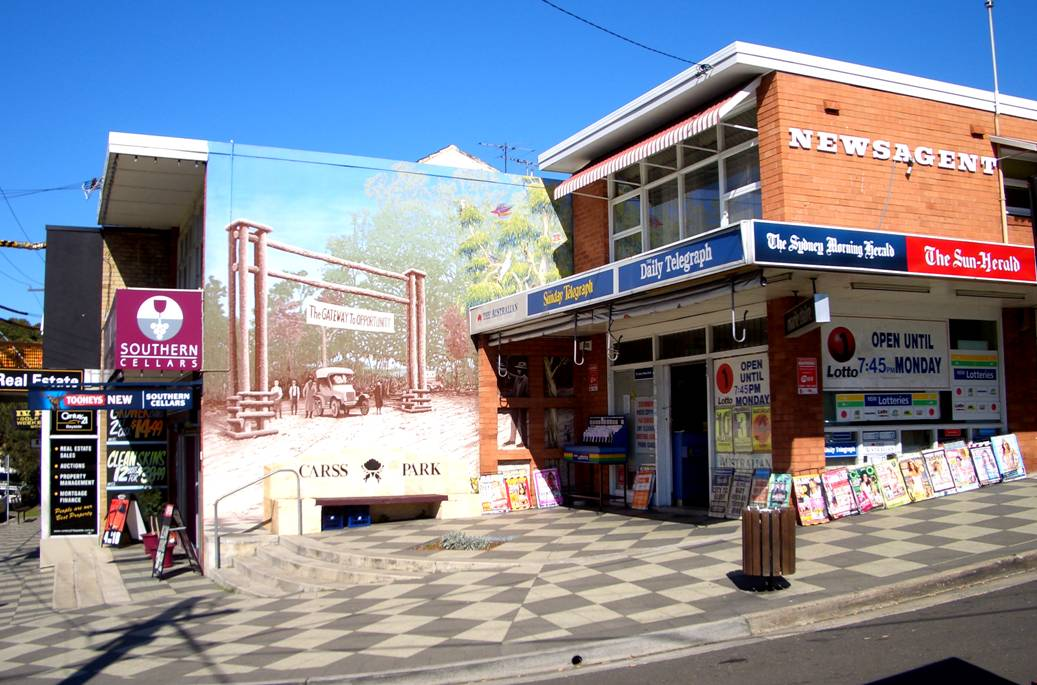
- Carwar Avenue

- Interactive map of Carss Park
- Coordinates: 33°59′14″S 151°07′08″E
- Country: Australia
- State: New South Wales
- City: Sydney
- LGA: Georges River Council
- Location: 17 km (11 mi) south of Sydney CBD

Government
  - State electorate: Kogarah
  - Federal division: Banks
- Elevation: 14 m (46 ft)

Population
  - Total: 1,265 (2021 census)
- Postcode: 2221
Suburbs around Carss Park
South Hurstville	Allawah	Kogarah Bay
Blakehurst	Carss Park	Sans Souci
Blakehurst	Georges River	Sans Souci

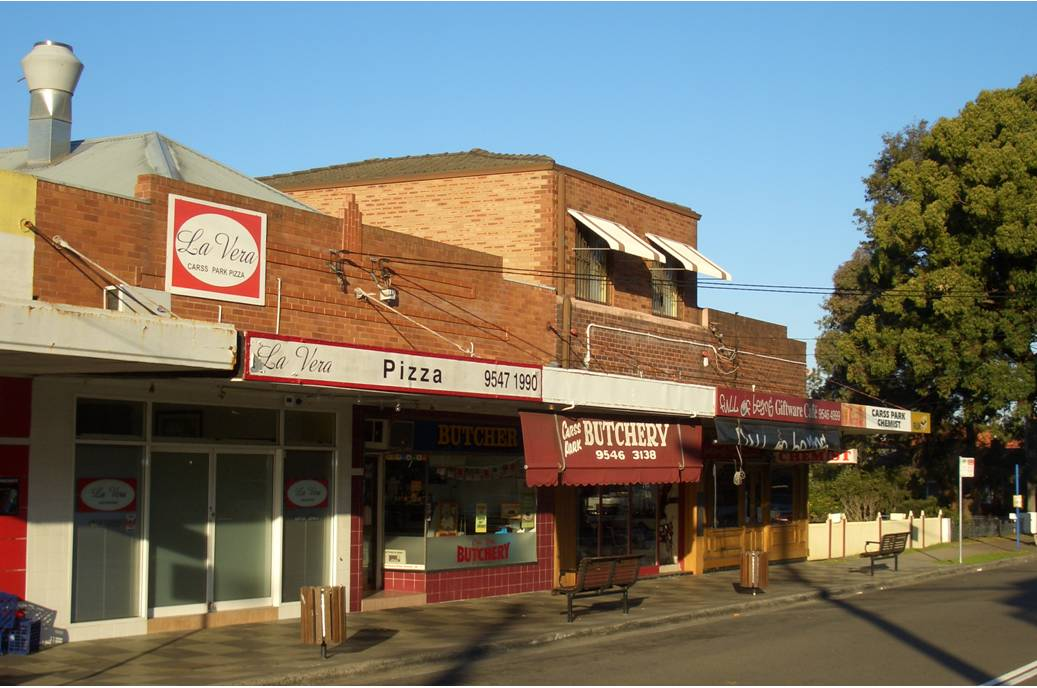
Carss Park Shops, Carwar Avenue

Carss Park is a suburb in southern Sydney, in the state of New South Wales, Australia 17 kilometres south of the Sydney central business district in the local government area of the Georges River Council. Carss Park is part of the St George area.

== History ==
In 1921 the Blakehurst Progress Association made attempts to secure Carss Bush for a public park and Kogarah council was able to acquire the land for the people. Carss Bush Park was dedicated on 26 January 1924 and 150 lots were auctioned on the same day for development. Many of the streets on the new estate were named after Aboriginal tribes.

== Heritage listings ==
Carss Park has a number of heritage-listed sites, including:

- 74 Carwar Avenue: Carss Cottage

== Demographics ==
According to the 2021 census of Population, there were 1,265 people usually resident in Carss Park. 70.6% of people were born in Australia. 61.8% of people spoke only English at home. Other languages spoken at home included Greek at 13.0%. The most common responses for religious affiliation were Catholic 25.6%, Orthodox 22.4%, No Religion 21.7% and Anglican 11.6%.

== Pop culture ==
- The family home in popular television series Packed to the Rafters is supposed to be located in Carss Park, although the actual location is in Concord. Filming does, however, take place on location in Carss Park and surrounding suburbs.

== Gallery ==
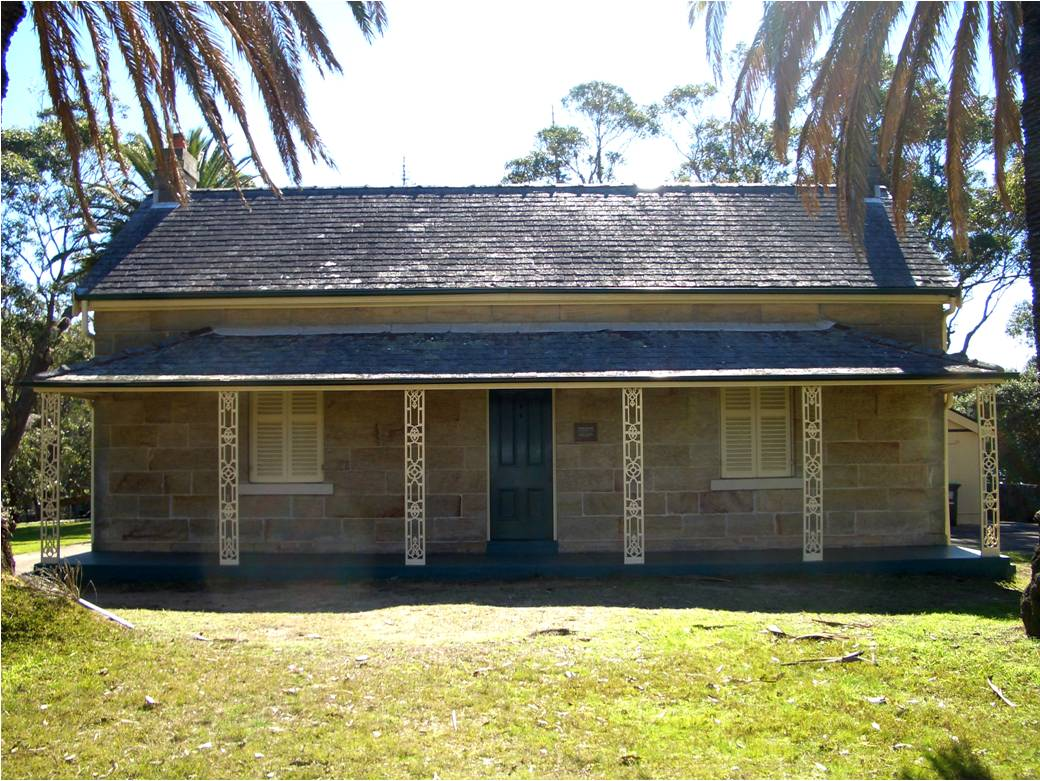
Carss Cottage front

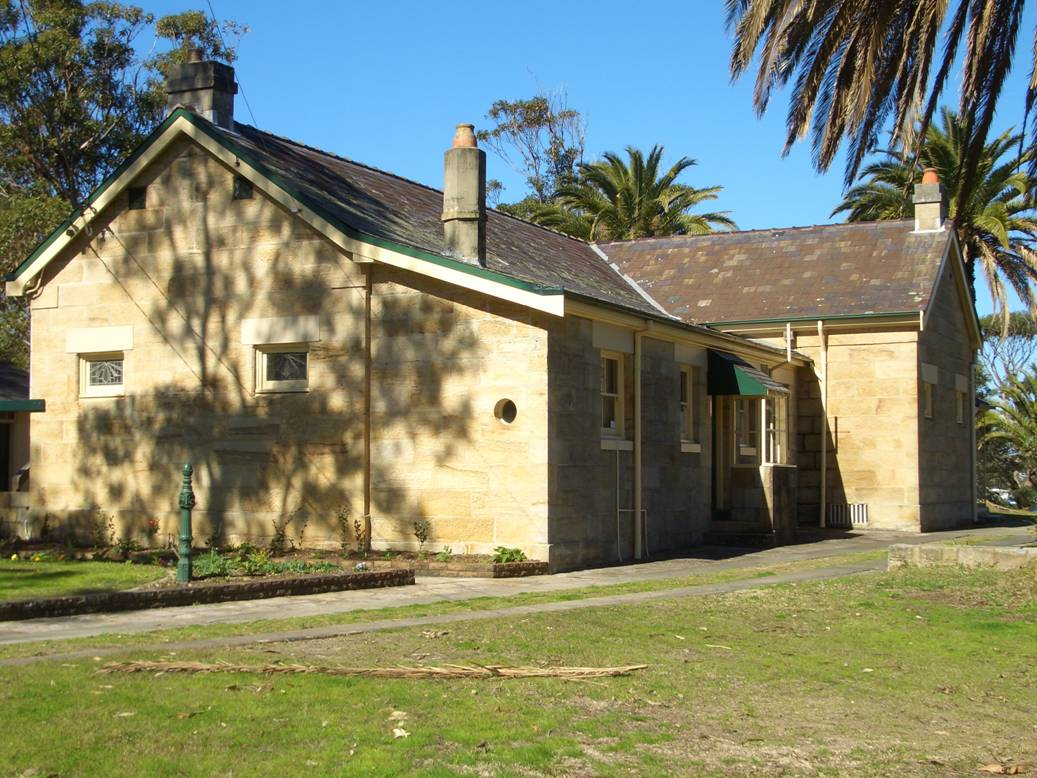
Carss Cottage side

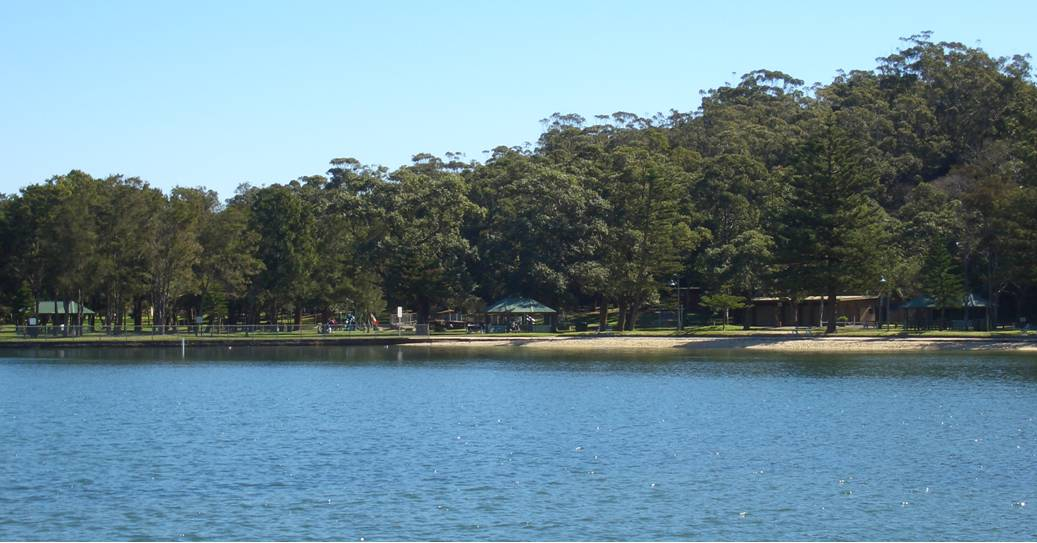
Carss Park saltwater baths

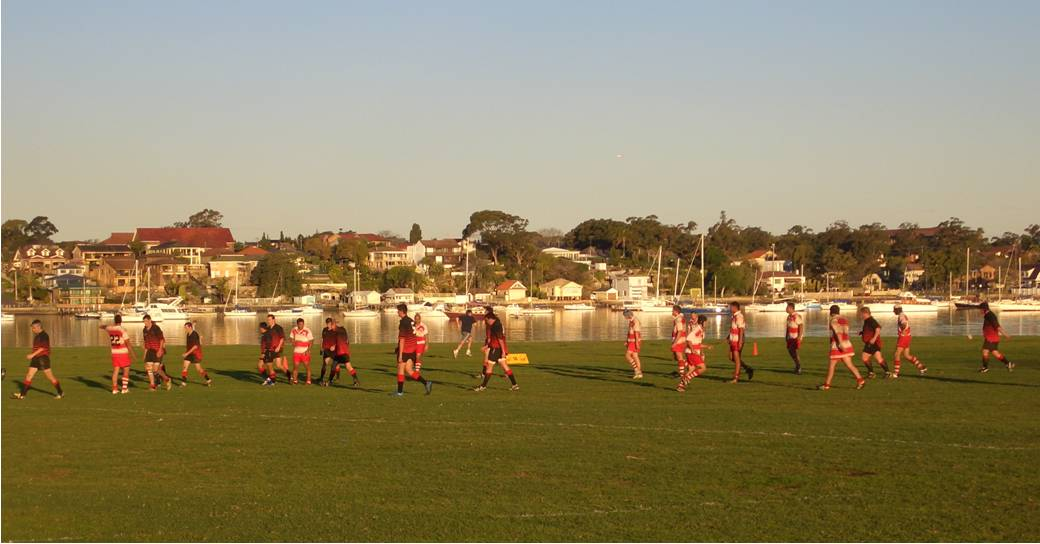
Rugby union match at Carss Bush Park
