= Georges River Council =

- Local government area
- Location in Metropolitan Sydney

- Coordinates: 33°58′S 151°08′E
- Country: Australia
- State: New South Wales
- Region: Metropolitan Sydney
- Established: 12 May 2016
- Council seat: Civic Centre, Hurstville

Government
  - Mayor: Elise Borg
  - State electorates: Kogarah; Oatley; Rockdale
  - Federal divisions: Banks; Barton; Cook

Area
  - Total: 38.36 km^{2} (14.81 sq mi)

Population
  - Total: 152,274 (2021 census) (47th)
  - Density: 3,969.6/km^{2} (10,281.2/sq mi)
- Website: Georges River Council
LGAs around Georges River Council
Canterbury Bankstown	Canterbury Bankstown	Bayside
Canterbury Bankstown	Georges River Council	Bayside
Sutherland	Sutherland	Bayside

Georges River Council is a local government area located in the St George region of Sydney located south of the Sydney CBD, in New South Wales, Australia. The Council was formed on 12 May 2016 from the merger of the Hurstville City Council and Kogarah City Council.

The Council comprises an area of 38.36 square kilometres (14.81 sq mi) and as at the 2021 census had a population of 152,274.

The mayor of Georges River Council is Elise Borg, who was elected by the council on 14 October 2024.

== History ==
=== Early history ===
The traditional Aboriginal inhabitants of the land now in the Georges River Council area were thought to be the Cadigal and Biddegal indigenous people.

=== Local government history ===
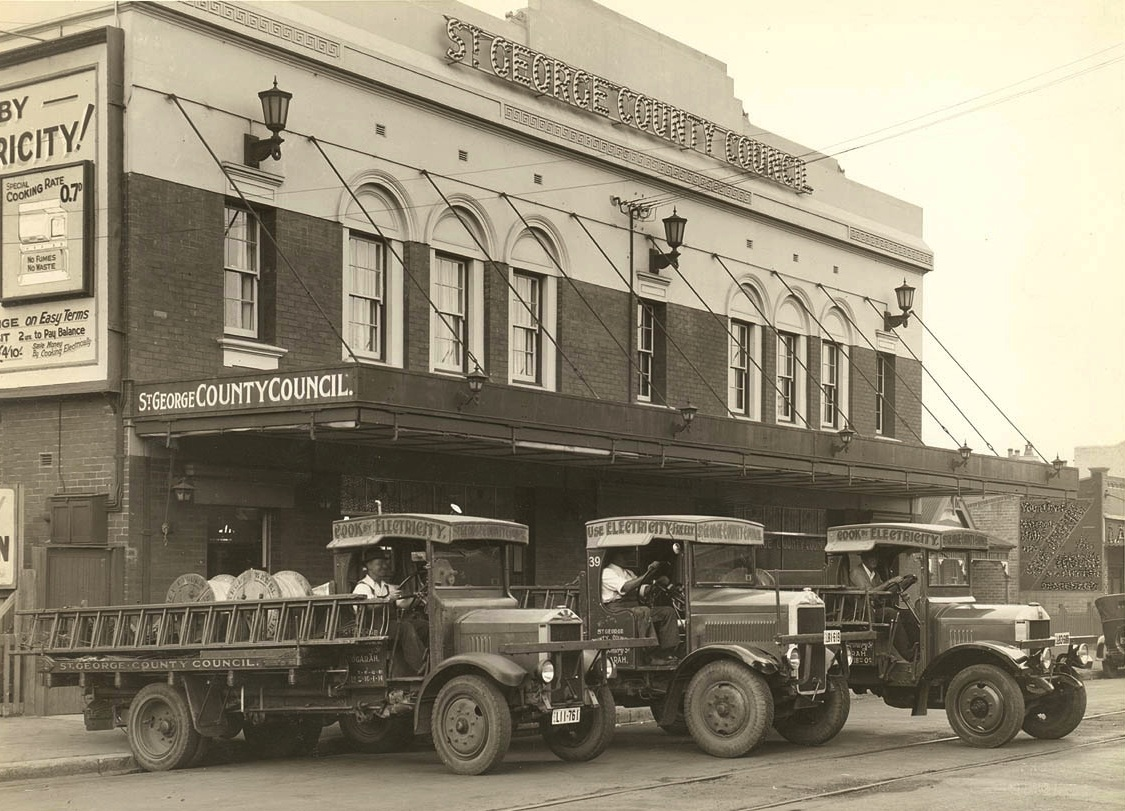
The St George County Council building in Montgomery St, Kogarah, c. 1937.

The "Municipal District of Kogarah" was proclaimed on 23 December 1885 and the District’s boundaries commenced at the intersection of the Illawarra Railway Line with the northern shore of George’s River. The Municipal District was re-named the "Municipality of Kogarah" following the passage of the Municipalities Act, 1897 on 6 December 1897. On 22 December 1916 and 1 January 1969, parts of Rockdale Municipality were transferred to Kogarah. In 1993, following the passing of the new Local Government Act, the Municipality of Kogarah became known as "Kogarah Council". Kogarah Council was proclaimed a city in 2008.

In December 1920, Kogarah combined with the councils of Rockdale, Hurstville, and Bexley to form the St George County Council. The elected County Council was established to provide electricity to the Kogarah, Rockdale, Hurstville, and Bexley areas and ceased to exist when it was amalgamated with the Sydney County Council on 1 January 1980.

On 25 March 1887 the NSW Government Gazette published a proclamation declaring the "Municipal District of Hurstville". On 28 June 1900, a further proclamation declared Bexley Ward of Hurstville be separated and named the Borough of Bexley. On 28 June 1900 a new proclamation declared the "Municipality of Hurstville". On 2 August 1922, a part of Hurstville was transferred to the Sutherland Shire, on 5 December 1924 part of Canterbury Municipality was transferred to Hurstville, and on 1 January 1931 part of Hurstville was given to Kogarah Municipality. On 25 November 1988 Hurstville was proclaimed a city, becoming the "Hurstville City Council".

Efforts to bring about a unified council for the St George area were raised regularly since 1901 and the 1946 Clancy Royal Commission into local government boundaries recommended the amalgamation of the municipalities of Hurstville, Kogarah, Rockdale and Bexley. In the following act of parliament passed in December 1948, the Local Government (Areas) Act 1948, the recommendations of the commission were modified, leading only to the merger of Bexley and Rockdale councils. A merger was again considered in the 1970s, but 1977 plebiscites run in Hustville and Kogarah rejected the idea. A further idea of amalgamating Kogarah and Hurstville with Sutherland Shire to the south was raised in 1999 but did not progress.

=== Establishment of Georges River Council ===
A 2015 review of local government boundaries by the NSW Government Independent Pricing and Regulatory Tribunal recommended that Kogarah merge with Hurstville to form a new council with an area of 38 square kilometres (15 sq mi) and support a population of approximately 147,000. However these proposals met with some opposition, including those in favour of a single "St George Council" combining Hurstville, Kogarah and Rockdale (which was to amalgamate with the City of Botany Bay). Despite these concerns however, on 12 May 2016, with the release of the Local Government (Council Amalgamations) Proclamation 2016, the Georges River Council was formed from Hurstville and Kogarah city councils, with former Sutherland Shire General Manager, John Rayner as administrator. The first meeting of the Georges River Council was held at Kogarah Civic Centre on 19 May 2016.

== Suburbs and localities in the local government area ==
Suburbs in the Georges River Council area are:

- Allawah
- Beverley Park
- Beverly Hills (parts are located within the City of Canterbury Bankstown)
- Blakehurst
- Carlton (parts are located within Bayside Council)
- Carss Park
- Connells Point
- Hurstville
- Hurstville Grove
- Kingsgrove (parts are located both within the City of Canterbury Bankstown and Bayside Council areas)
- Kogarah (parts are located within Bayside Council)
- Kogarah Bay
- Kyle Bay
- Lugarno
- Mortdale
- Mortdale Heights
- Narwee (parts are located within the City of Canterbury Bankstown)
- Oatley
- Peakhurst
- Peakhurst Heights
- Penshurst
- Ramsgate (parts are located within Bayside Council)
- Riverwood (parts are located within the City of Canterbury Bankstown)
- Sans Souci (parts are located within Bayside Council)
- South Hurstville

Georges River Council also manages and maintains the following localities:

- Bald Face
- Boggywell Creek
- Carss Point
- Connells Bay
- Edith Bay
- Gertrude Point
- Gungah Bay
- Hurstville Bay
- Jew Fish Bay
- Jew Fish Point
- Harness Cask Point
- Kingsway
- Lime Kiln Bay
- Lime Kiln Head
- Neverfail Bay
- Oatley Bay
- Oatley West
- Shipwright Bay
- Soilybottom Point
- Tom Uglys Point

== Demographics ==
At the 2016 census, there were 146,841 people resident in the Georges River local government area; of these 48.9 per cent were male and 51.1 per cent were female. Aboriginal and Torres Strait Islander people made up 0.5 per cent of the population; significantly below the NSW and Australian averages of 2.9 and 2.8 per cent respectively. The median age of people in Georges River Council was 37 years; marginally lower than the national median of 38 years. Children aged 0 – 14 years made up 16.8 per cent of the population and people aged 65 years and over made up 15.3 per cent of the population. Of people in the area aged 15 years and over, 53.1 per cent were married and 9.1 per cent were either divorced or separated.

At the 2016 census, the proportion of residents in the Georges River local government area who stated their ancestry as Australian or Anglo-Saxon approached 29 per cent of all residents. In excess of 51 per cent of all residents in Georges River Council nominated a religious affiliation with Christianity at the 2016 census, which was below the national average of 57.7 per cent. Meanwhile, as at the census date, compared to the national average, households in the Georges River local government area had a significantly higher than average proportion (56.1 per cent) where two or more languages are spoken (national average was 22.2 per cent); and a lower proportion (42.3 per cent) where English only was spoken at home (national average was 72.7 per cent).

Selected historical census data for Georges River Council local government area
Census year		2016
Population	Estimated residents on census night	146,841
Population	LGA rank in terms of size within New South Wales	19th
Population	% of New South Wales population	1.96%
Population	% of Australian population	0.63%
Cultural and language diversity		
Ancestry, top responses	Chinese	22.8%
Ancestry, top responses	English	13.3%
Ancestry, top responses	Australian	12.6%
Ancestry, top responses	Greek	6.0%
Ancestry, top responses	Irish	4.8%
Language, top responses (other than English)	Mandarin	14.4%
Language, top responses (other than English)	Cantonese	9.9%
Language, top responses (other than English)	Greek	5.4%
Language, top responses (other than English)	Arabic	3.6%
Language, top responses (other than English)	Nepali	3.4%
Religious affiliation		
Religious affiliation, top responses	No religion, as described	27.4%
Religious affiliation, top responses	Catholic	21.3%
Religious affiliation, top responses	Eastern Orthodox	10.0%
Religious affiliation, top responses	Anglican	8.7%
Religious affiliation, top responses	Not stated	7.5%
Median weekly incomes		
Personal income	Median weekly personal income	$640
Personal income	% of Australian median income	96.68%
Family income	Median weekly family income	$1,817
Family income	% of Australian median income	104.79%
Household income	Median weekly household income	$1,654
Household income	% of Australian median income	115.02%

== Council ==
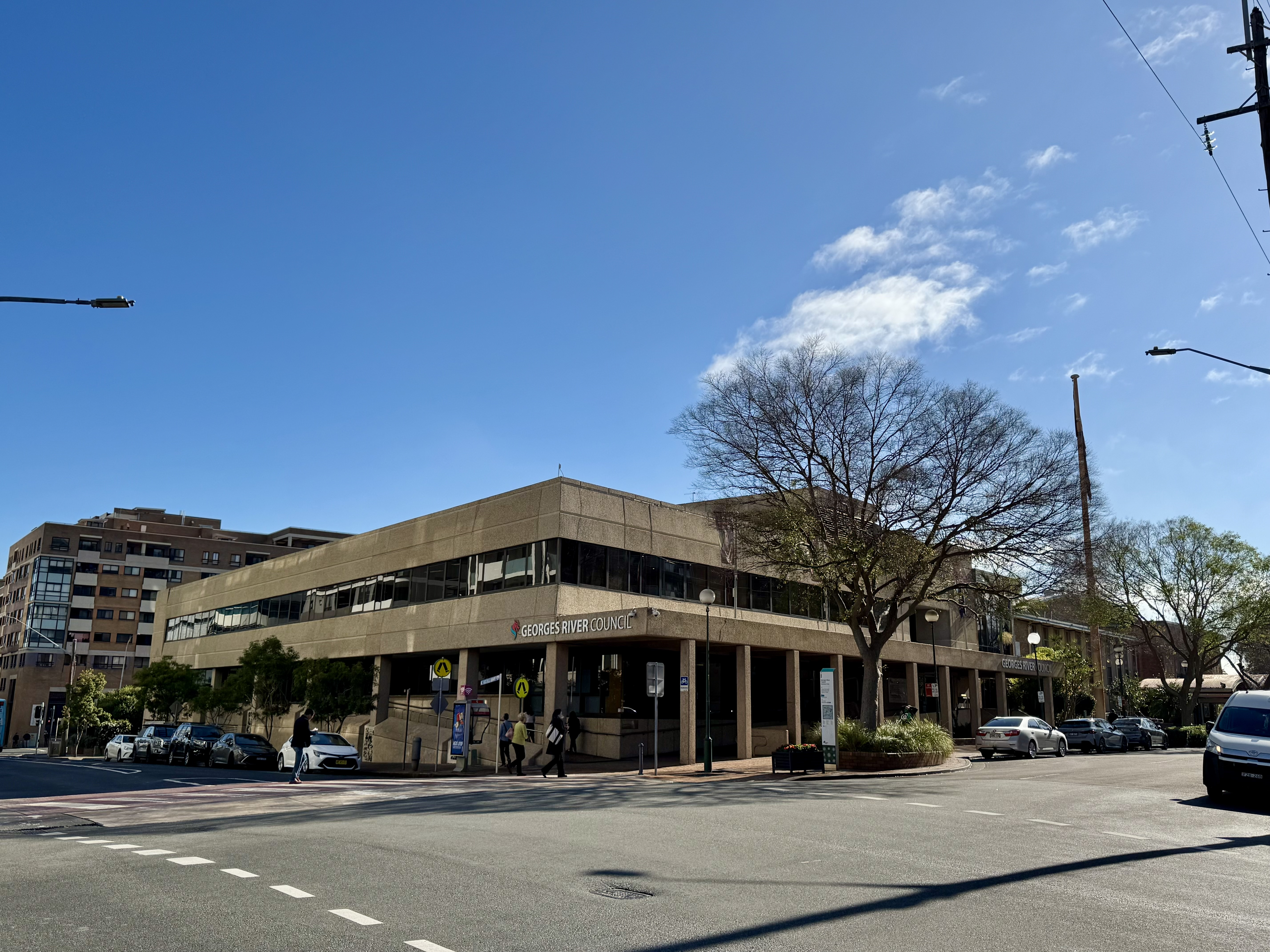
Georges River Civic Centre, MacMahon Street, Hurstville.

Georges River Council comprises fifteen Councillors elected proportionally, with three Councillors elected in five wards. Councillors are elected for a fixed four-year term of office, with the first term to last for three years. The Mayor is elected by Councillors for a period of two years, the Deputy Mayor is elected for one year. The council first met in the Kogarah Civic Centre on 19 May 2016 and the new seat of the council is the Georges River Civic Centre (formerly Hurstville Civic Centre) in MacMahon Street, Hurstville.

Mayor	Term	Notes
John Rayner PSM (Administrator)	12 May 2016 – 25 September 2017	Shire Clerk/General Manager of Sutherland Shire 1982–2015
Kevin Greene (ALP)	25 September 2017 – 30 December 2021	MP for Georges River and Oatley 1999–2011
Nick Katris (ALP)	30 December 2021 – 25 September 2023	
Sam Elmir (LIB)	25 September 2023 – 14 October 2024	
Elise Borg (GRRP)	14 October 2024 – present	
Deputy Mayor	Term	Notes
Kathryn Landsberry (ALP)	25 September 2017 – 24 September 2018	
Sam Elmir (LIB)	24 September 2018 – 23 September 2019	
Con Hindi (LIB)	23 September 2019 – 28 September 2020	
Stephen Agius (LIB)	28 September 2020 – 30 December 2021	
Kathryn Landsberry (ALP)	30 December 2021 – 25 September 2023	
Elise Borg (GRRP)	25 September 2023 – 14 October 2024	
Nancy Liu (LIB)	14 October 2024 – 26 September 2025	
Sam Stratikopoulos (LIB)	26 September 2025 – present	
General Manager	Term	Notes
Gail Connolly	12 May 2016 – April 2022	General Manager of Ryde 2015–2016
David Tuxford	April 2022 – present	Director of Business & Corporate Services at GRC 2018 – 2022

=== Current composition ===
The most recent full council election was held on 14 September 2024, and the makeup of the council by order of election, following the expulsion of Councillor Landsberry from the Labor Party in 2026, is as follows:

Party	Councillors
Georges River Residents and Ratepayers Party	5
Labor	5
Liberal	3
Independent	2
Total	15

Ward	Councillor	Party	Notes
Blakehurst Ward	Natalie Mort	GRRRP	Elected 2021
Blakehurst Ward	Oliver Dimoski	Liberal	Elected 2024
Blakehurst Ward	Kathryn Landsberry	Independent	Elected 2017; Kogarah Middle Ward Councillor 2004–2016; Deputy Mayor 2017–2018, 2021–2023. Labor until 2026.
Hurstville Ward	Leon Pun	Labor	Elected 2024
Hurstville Ward	Nancy Liu	Liberal	Elected 2017; Hurstville Ward Councillor 2008–2016; Deputy Mayor 2024–2025
Hurstville Ward	Benjamin Wang	Independent	Elected 2021
Kogarah Bay Ward	Thomas Gao	Labor	Elected 2024
Kogarah Bay Ward	Elise Borg	GRRRP	Elected 2021; Deputy Mayor 2023–present; Mayor 2024–present
Kogarah Bay Ward	Sam Stratikopoulos	Liberal	Elected 2017; Kogarah City Councillor 2012–2016; Deputy Mayor 2025–present
Mortdale Ward	Tom Arthur	Labor	Elected 2024
Mortdale Ward	Gerard Hayes	Labor	Elected at a countback election held on 8 July 2025 following the resignation of Ash Ambihaipahar on 27 May 2025.
Mortdale Ward	Christina Jamieson	GRRRP	
Peakhurst Ward	Elaina Anzellotti	Labor	Elected 2024
Peakhurst Ward	Peter Mahoney	GRRRP	
Peakhurst Ward	Matthew Allison	GRRRP	Elected 2024

== Election results ==
=== 2024 ===
2024 Georges River Council election: Ward results
Party	Votes	%	Swing	Seats	Change
Labor	30,247	39.06	+6.66	6	▲1
Residents and Ratepayers	24,389	31.49	+10.09	5	▲1
Liberal	16,281	21.02	−7.98	3	▼2
Georges River Association	3,607	4.66	+1.96	1	Steady
Kogarah Residents' Association	1,065	1.38	+1.38	0	Steady
Libertarian	553	0.71	+0.71	0	Steady
Greens	474	0.61	+0.61	0	Steady
Public Education	82	0.11	+0.11	0	Steady
Independents	741	0.96	−12.34	0	Steady
Formal votes	77,439	92.9			
Informal votes	5,928	7.1			
Total	83,367	100.0		15	
Registered voters / turnout	96,882	86.1			

=== 2021 ===
2021 New South Wales local elections: Georges River
Party	Votes	%	Swing	Seats	Change
Labor	25,064	32.4	−5.7	5	▼1
Liberal	22,459	29.0	−4.6	5	Steady
Residents and Ratepayers	16,607	21.4	+21.4	4	▲4
Independents	10,279	13.3	−5.1	0	▼3
Georges River Association	2,105	2.7	+2.7	1	▲1
Kogarah Residents' Association	919	1.2	−3.4	0	▼1
Communist League	17	0.0	+0.0	0	Steady
Formal votes	77,450	94.56			
Informal votes	4,456	5.44			
Total	81,906	100.00			

== Council logo ==
On 3 April 2017, Georges River Council adopted its new logo and branding as required by the NSW state government proclamation. The logo, one of three designed by council staff, was adopted following a community consultation process which looked at the three options. The successful choice, featuring a dragon (which is representative of the St George region and appeared on the former Hurstville City Council logo and coat of arms), was chosen due to "perceived meaning, diversity, relevance to the local area including connections to St George and the logo’s representation to the community including links to multiculturalism and sport".

The consultations resulted in several changes before its unveiling, including changing the direction of the dragon, the adoption of the red colour from the interim council typeface logo used since amalgamation, and the addition of a Port Jackson fig tree leaf motif, to represent the indigenous heritage of the area.

== Heritage listings ==
The Georges River Council has a number of heritage-listed sites, including:

- Beverly Hills, East Hills railway: Beverly Hills railway station
- Blakehurst, 9 Stuart Crescent: Thurlow House
- Carss Park, 74 Carwar Avenue: Carss Cottage
- Oatley, Illawarra railway: Oatley railway station
- Oatley, over Georges River: Old Como railway bridge
- Penshurst, 663-665 King Georges Road: West Maling
- Penshurst, Laycock Road: Penshurst Reservoirs

== See also ==
- Local government areas of New South Wales
