= Kogarah Bay =

- Suburb
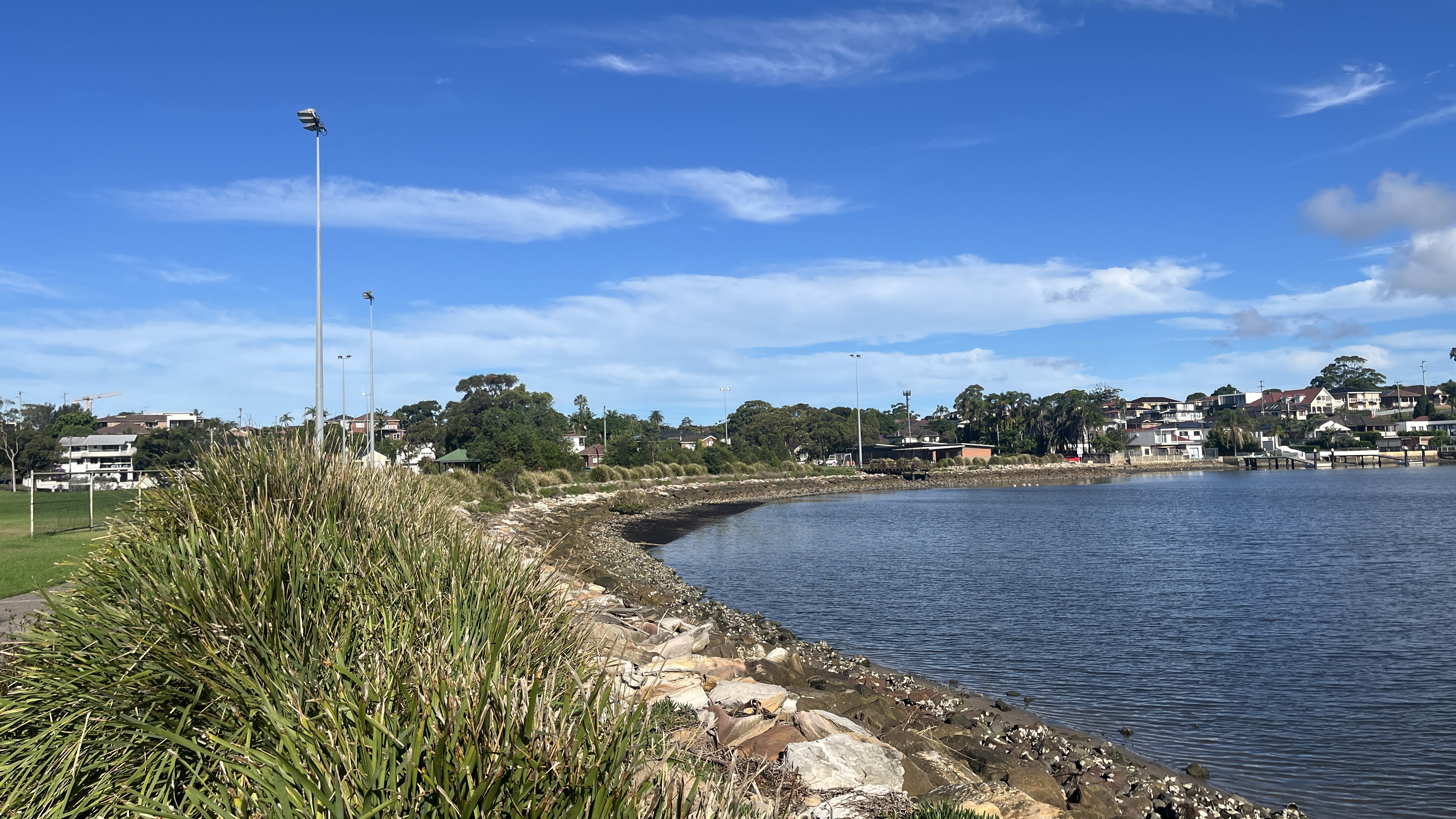
- Kogarah Bay shoreline

- Interactive map of Kogarah Bay
- Country: Australia
- State: New South Wales
- City: Sydney
- LGA: Georges River Council
- Location: 16 km (9.9 mi) south of Sydney CBD

Government
  - State electorate: Kogarah
  - Federal division: Barton
- Elevation: 17 m (56 ft)

Population
  - Total: 2,102 (2021 census)
- Postcode: 2217
Suburbs around Kogarah Bay
Carlton	Carlton	Beverly Park
Blakehurst	Kogarah Bay	Sans Souci
Carss Park	Carss Park	Carss Park

Kogarah Bay is a suburb in southern Sydney, in the state of New South Wales, Australia 16 kilometres south of the Sydney central business district. It is part of the St George area. Kogarah Bay is in the local government area of the Georges River Council.

Kogarah Bay takes its name from the small bay on the northern shore of the Georges River. The suburb is surrounded by the suburbs of Carss Park, Blakehurst, Carlton, Beverley Park and Sans Souci. A small group of shops is located on the intersection of Park Road and the Princes Highway.

== History ==
Kogarah is from an aboriginal word meaning rushes or place of reeds. It had also been written as 'coggera' or 'cogerah' but the current spelling was settled when the railway line came through the area in the 1880s. Kogarah Bay and Beverley Park were originally part of the suburb of Kogarah.

== Parks ==
- Harold Frazer Reserve
- Parkside Drive Reserve

== Churches ==
- Kogarah Bay Congregational Church

== Population ==
According to the 2021 census of Population, there were 2,102 people usually resident in Kogarah Bay. 64.3% of people were born in Australia. 51.3% of people only spoke English at home. Other languages spoken at home included Greek 12.8%, Arabic 6.3% and Cantonese 4.9%. The most common responses for religious affiliation were Eastern Orthodox 26.3%, Catholic 24.7%, No Religion 18.1% and Anglican 6.9%.
