= Sydney Sailors' Home =

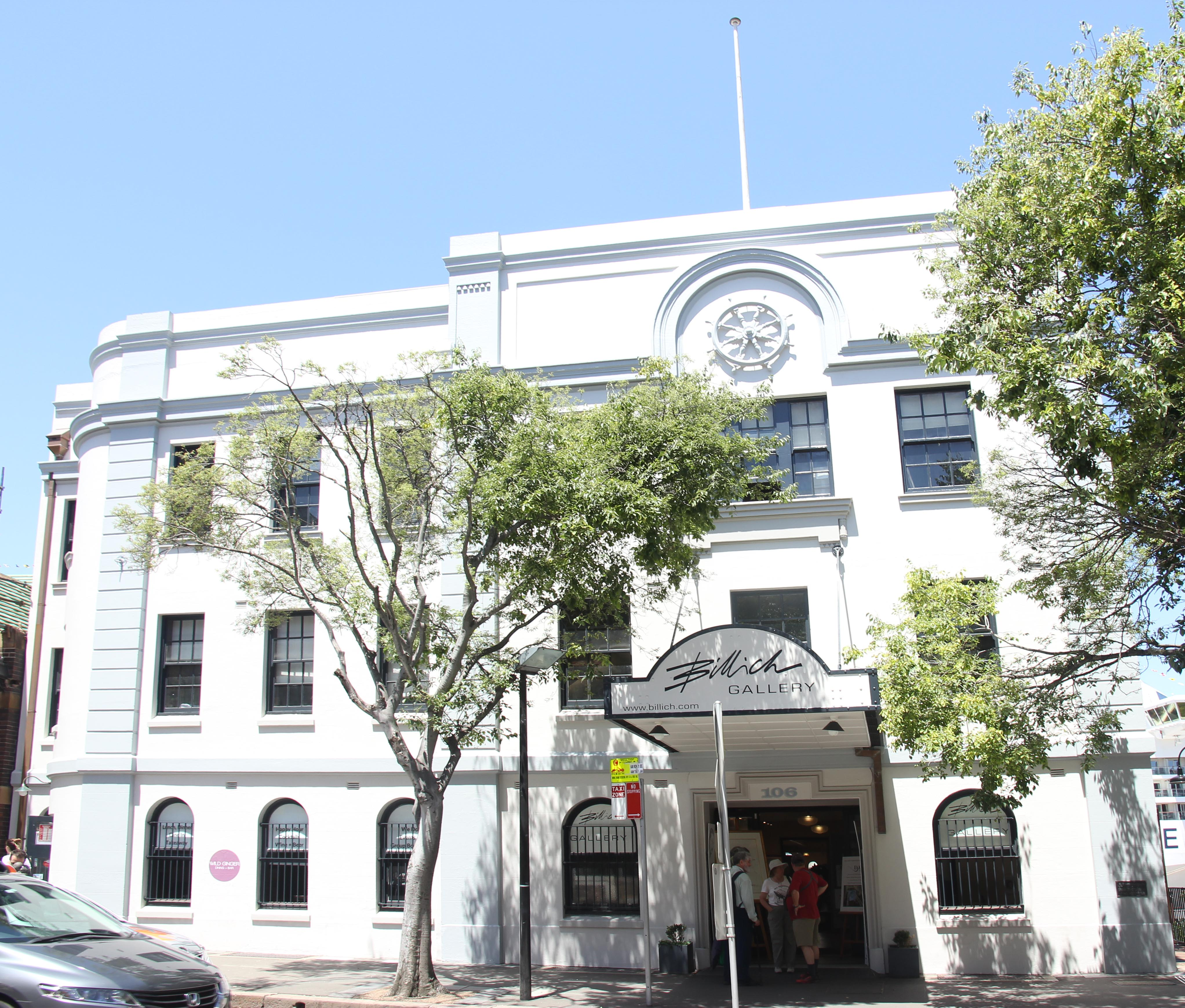
- Sydney Sailors' Home, pictured in 2019

- Location within Sydney Location within Australia
- 33.8587°S 151.2093°E
- Location: 106–108 George Street, The Rocks, City of Sydney, New South Wales, Australia

History
- Built: 1864–1926

Site notes
- Architects: Weaver & Kemp (1864); Spain and Cosh (1926)
- Architectural styles: Victorian Italianate (1864); Inter-War Free Classical (1926)
- Owner: Property NSW

New South Wales Heritage Register
- Official name: Sailor's Home (former); Sailors' Home; Marionette Theatre; The Rocks Heritage and Information Centre
- Type: State heritage (built)
- Designated: 10 May 2002
- Reference no.: 1576
- Type: Barracks & housing
- Category: Defence

The Sydney Sailors' Home is a heritage-listed former sailors' home, theatre and visitor's centre, located at 106–108 George Street, in The Rocks in the City of Sydney local government area of New South Wales, Australia. It was designed and built in two stages: in 1864 by Weaver & Kemp and in 1926 by Spain and Cosh. It is also known as the former Marionette Theatre and The Rocks Heritage and Information Centre. The property is owned by Placemaking NSW, an agency of the Government of New South Wales. It was added to the New South Wales State Heritage Register on 10 May 2002.

== History ==
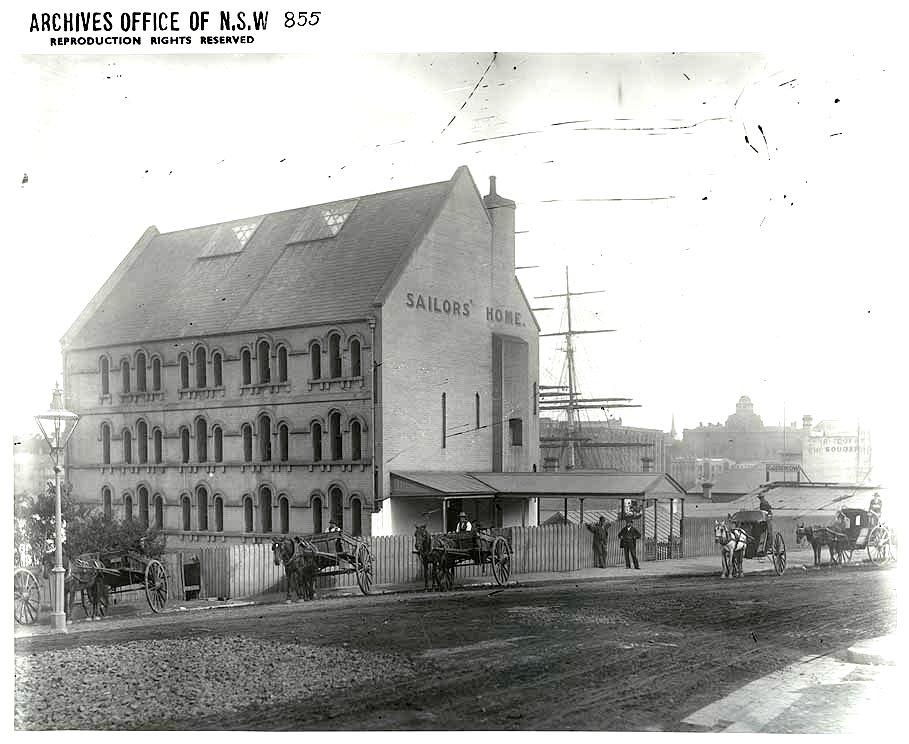
Sydney Sailors' Home, undated.

In 1860, the Colonial Government decided to grant the Committee of the Sydney Sailors' Home a site at Circular Quay. The original site was once a series of sandstone ledges and a sandy beach. It extended both to the north and to the south of the present boundaries, to include Cadman's Cottage, and a portion of the land on which the former City Coroner's Court now stands. The Water Police used the site from 1846–53, and renovated Cadman's Cottage for use as a court with jail cells. The Dead House (morgue) was constructed at the northern end of the site. The location was considered suitable for the Home as it was close to the Quay and to the recently established Mariners Church.

The Home had its origins in a benevolent movement dedicated to the elevation of the Sailors' condition and character, and by the 1860s such institutions were considered essential to any sizeable British port. It provided clean, comfortable and inexpensive board and lodging for sailors and other persons of all nationalities employed in sea-going ships and vessels. Architects Messrs. Weaver and Kemp of 181 Pitt Street Sydney were appointed and by April 1860, Kemp had produced an extensive design, similar in form, scale and proportion to that of the Brunswick Maritime Establishment in London's Docklands. The northern wing was completed in 1864 and the building made provision for the future construction of Weaver & Kemp's extensive scheme. The building stood four storeys high. The sandstone basement contained kitchen and dining facilities. The storeys above were brickwork with sandstone detailing to the window sills, corbels, arched heads and string courses.

A bequest in 1916 enabled the Carss Wing to be added to the Home, and in 1925 Sydney City Council approved plans for a major extension designed by Spain & Cosh. An L-shaped structure, the new wing, completed in 1926, abutted the 1864 building and presented a Federation Free Classical facade to George Street.

The history of the Sailors' Home is inextricably linked with the adjacent Cadmans Cottage. The first Superintendent restored the Cottage as a residence in 1865 and it was used as such until 1926, when the new extension to the Home provided a residence for the Superintendent and his family. The cottage was used as an overflow for sailors accommodation until the late 1950s, when it was vacated and fell into disrepair.

In 1970, the Sydney Cove Redevelopment Authority (now Placemaking NSW) resumed the site. Cadmans Cottage was gazetted under the National Parks and Wildlife Act as a Historic Site. About this time, sailors' wages increased dramatically, and with this their expectations of standard of accommodation, so attendance at the home dropped.

In 1980–81, plans were prepared by Hall, Bowe and Webber Pty Ltd Architects to adapt the building for use by the Marionette Theatre of Australia, approved by Council in 1983. This work involved substantial structural changes and the removal of significant fabric. This use ceased in the later 1980s. In 1993 conservation works were completed by the Sydney Cove Redevelopment Authority reversing many of the 1983 changes and the Heritage and Information Centre opened in the building in the following year. Later this was replaced with the Sydney Visitor Centre. In 1995, level 1 and part of level two were adapted to restaurant use and leased to a private operator. In 2005 the Sydney Visitor centre moved out of the building.

The building subsequently housed a Charles Billich commercial art gallery. Billich was named Artist of the 1996 Summer Olympics. He is the recipient of the 2000 Sport Artist of the Year Award presented annually by the American Sport Art Museum and Archives. He was named Designated Artist 2001 Centenary Nobel Peace Prize. Inspired by his work entitled The Beijing Cityscape, the official image for the successful Beijing bid to host the 2008 Olympic Games, Billich conceived a series of images based on the Bing Ma Yong Terracotta warriors. The Bing Ma Yong images are represented on a collection of 16 postage stamps currently in circulation in China. The gallery closed in 2024.

== Description ==
The building known as The Sailor's Home currently stands as two attached structures located on the eastern side of George Street. A four-storey L-shaped block fronts George Street returning along the northern side of the site to partially enclose a rectangular block of similar height. The L-shaped block is finished in Classical Revival style whilst the rectangular block features Romanesque style window openings and associated stringer courses. A continuous parapet in Classical Revival style links the blocks.

Style

- 1864 – Victorian Italianate
- 1926 – Inter-War Free Classical
- Four storeys

Roof Cladding

- 1863 – Slate
- 1926 – Membrane

Floor Frame

- Timber

=== Condition ===
As at 7 December 1999, good physical condition. Archaeology Assessment Condition: Mostly disturbed. Assessment Basis: Floors terraced into hill slope from Circular Quay West. Sandstone bedrock visible on side adjacent to Cadman's Cottage. Investigation: Watching Brief.

=== Modifications and dates ===
In 1926 major additions were carried out to the building. An L-shaped addition was added along the George Street (west) side and north side of the building, almost doubling its volume. The gabled roof of the 1870s rectangular building was removed and the whole roof was made flat, behind parapets. In 1983 the 200 seat Marionette Theatre was opened following conversion for an auditorium, foyers, rehearsal rooms and workshops involving substantial structural changes and incorporation of stringent fire requirements, costing over $0.5m. The mezzanine gallery and its supporting structure was removed at this time. During its adaptation as The Rocks Heritage and Information Centre (later Sydney Visitor Centre) in 1991-3, the mezzanine gallery, its supporting columns and a sailor's cubicle in the 1880s block were reinstated. This work was based on documentary and physical evidence. Adaptations included an internal stair linking the gallery levels 2, 3, and 4, and the commercial kitchens and restaurant fitouts on level 1 and level two in the north western corner. The Heritage Centre exhibition and retail fit-out in 1993 and subsequent additions to the fitout in 1996 and 1998 were designed to be reversible. The building was again refurbished in 2006 for use as an art gallery.

== Heritage listing ==
Since 2002, the Sydney Sailors' Home and site are of State heritage significance for their historical and scientific cultural values. The site and building are also of State heritage significance for their contribution to The Rocks area which is of State Heritage significance in its own right. The Sailors' Home is significant primarily because it provides an important historical record of changing attitudes to social welfare in the 19th and 20th centuries.

The building fabric records the foundation and changing operation of a comfortable home ashore for transiting sailors of all nationalities. The physical fabric retains evidence of the meagre expectations of the working class, in particular seamen, during 19th century, and through its expansion and ongoing use provides evidence of a continuing acceptance of these standards, well into the 20th century. Internally and externally, sufficient detailed fabric remains to provide a physical record of the building's earliest use. The fabric and history of the Sailors' Home records changing social values of the 20th century, with the construction and subsequent removal of racially segregated facilities, and with the eventual lapse of interest in the Home following the reassessment of seamen's wages in the 1970s.

The construction of the 1860s block as part of a grand overall scheme highlights both an awareness of the growing importance of Sydney in the mid 19th century, and a competitive desire to match the "mother country" amongst the Colony's citizenry. This desire is further evidenced in the original design through its obvious derivation from a British model. The Sailors' Home is thus a good illustration of Australia's dependence on British architectural trends at that time. The history and significance of the Sailors' Home is inextricably linked with its location. The Home's long association with Cadman's Cottage, The Mariners' Church, Circular Quay and the general fabric of The Rocks area (and in particular the hotels), render the building historically significant. The original Sailors' Home, designed by Weaver & Kemp is one of the earliest Sydney examples of the Romanesque Revival Style. The 1920s additions by Spain & Cosh are a remarkable example of contextual design.

The Sydney Sailor's Home was listed on the New South Wales State Heritage Register on 10 May 2002 having satisfied the following criteria.

The place is important in demonstrating the course, or pattern, of cultural or natural history in New South Wales.

The Sailors Home and site are of State heritage significance for their historical and scientific cultural values. The site and building are also of State heritage significance for their contribution to The Rocks area which is of State Heritage significance in its own right (see item no. 4500458).

The Sailors' Home is significant primarily because it provides an important historical record of changing attitudes to social welfare in the 19th and 20th centuries.

The building fabric records the foundation and changing operation of a comfortable home ashore for transiting sailors of all nationalities. The physical fabric retains evidence of the meagre expectations of the working class, in particular seamen, during 19th century, and through its expansion and ongoing use provides evidence of a continuing acceptance of these standards, well into the 20th century. Internally and externally, sufficient detailed fabric remains to provide a physical record of the building's earliest use. The fabric and history of the Sailors' Home records changing social values of the 20th century, with the construction and subsequent removal of racially segregated facilities, and with the eventual lapse of interest in the Home following the reassessment of seamen's wages in the 1970s.

The construction of the 1860s block as part of a grand overall scheme highlights both an awareness of the growing importance of Sydney in the mid 19th century, and a competitive desire to match the "mother country" amongst the Colony's citizenry. This desire is further evidenced in the original design through its obvious derivation from a British model. The Sailors' Home is thus a good illustration of Australia's dependence on British architectural trends at that time. The history and significance of the Sailors' Home is inextricably linked with its location. The Home's long association with Cadman's Cottage, The Mariners' Church, Circular Quay and the general fabric of The Rocks area (and in particular the hotels), render the building historically significant.

The place is important in demonstrating aesthetic characteristics and/or a high degree of creative or technical achievement in New South Wales.

The original Sailors' Home, designed by Weaver & Kemp, is one of the earliest Sydney examples of the Romanesque Revival Style. The 1920s additions by Spain & Cosh are a remarkable example of contextual design

== See also ==
- Australian non-residential architectural styles
- Old Coroner's Court
