= City of Rockdale =

Australian local government area, 1995–2016

- Local government area
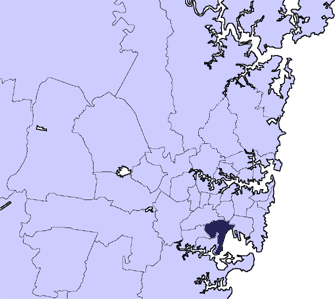
- Location in Metropolitan Sydney

- Coordinates: 33°55′S 151°15′E
- Country: Australia
- State: New South Wales
- Region: St George
- Established: 13 January 1871
- Abolished: 9 September 2016
- Council seat: Rockdale Town Hall

Area
  - Total: 28 km^{2} (11 sq mi)

Population
  - Total: 97,340 (2011)
  - Density: 3,476.4/km^{2} (9,004/sq mi)
- Parish: St George
- Website: City of Rockdale
LGAs around City of Rockdale
Canterbury-Bankstown	Inner West	City of Botany Bay
Georges River	City of Rockdale	Botany Bay
Georges River	Sutherland	Sutherland

The City of Rockdale was a local government area in southern and St George regions of Sydney, in the state of New South Wales, Australia. The city centre was located 12 kilometres (7.5 mi) south-west of the Sydney central business district, on the western shores of Botany Bay. First proclaimed on 13 January 1871, Rockdale was formerly known as the Municipality of West Botany until 1887 and the Municipality of Rockdale before being proclaimed as a City in 1995. Rockdale was amalgamated with the neighbouring City of Botany Bay on 9 September 2016 to form the new municipality of Bayside Council.

The last mayor of the City of Rockdale at amalgamation was Mayor Bill Saravinovski, a member of the Labor Party.

Mayor Bill Saravinovski was elected the following year as first mayor of Bayside Council.

== Suburbs and localities in the local government area ==
Suburbs in the City of Rockdale were:

- Arncliffe
- Banksia
- Bardwell Park
- Bardwell Valley
- Bexley
- Bexley North
- Brighton-Le-Sands
- Carlton (parts are located in Georges River Council)
- Dolls Point
- Kingsgrove (parts are located in the City of Canterbury-Bankstown & Georges River Council)
- Kogarah (parts are located in Georges River Council)
- Kyeemagh
- Monterey
- Ramsgate
- Ramsgate Beach
- Rockdale
- Sandringham
- Sans Souci (parts are located in Georges River Council)
- Turrella
- Wolli Creek

The City of Rockdale also managed and maintained the following localities:

- Bardwell Creek
- Cooks Cove
- Lady Robinson Beach
- Muddy Creek
- Rocky Point
- Sandringham Bay
- St Kilda Point

== History ==
=== West Botany ===
The City of Rockdale was originally proclaimed as the "Municipal District of West Botany" on 13 January 1871 and covered 23 square kilometres (9 mi^{2}) with two Wards, West Botany Ward and Arncliffe Ward. The proclamation followed a petition signed by 85 residents calling for incorporation that was published in the Government Gazette on 22 August 1870. The first election was held on 8 February 1871 at the Tempe Family Hotel on Rocky Point Road. The mayor of Marrickville, Charles St Julian, was appointed Returning Officer for the first election of six aldermen and two auditors, which was declared on 14 February 1871:

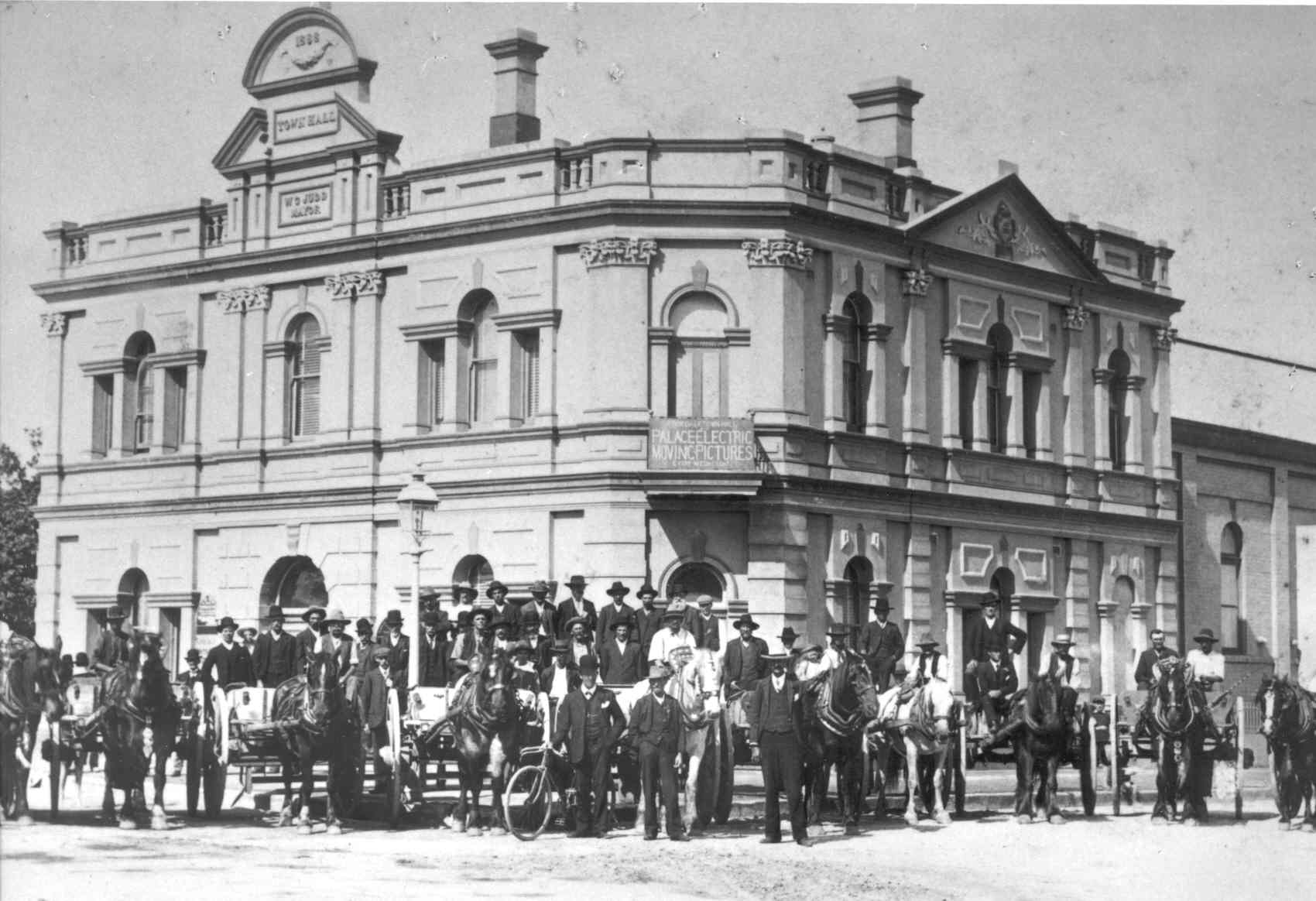
The first Rockdale Town Hall (1888) on the corner of Rocky Point Road and Bryant Street, Rockdale, c. 1890, was demolished in 1940 to make way for the new Town Hall.

Seat	Alderman	Notes
Arncliffe Ward	Thomas Woolacott	Freeholder, Tempe.
Arncliffe Ward	William Yates	Freeholder, Rosebrook, Tempe. Elected Mayor.
Arncliffe Ward	John McInnes	Publican of the "Tempe Family Hotel", Arncliffe.
West Botany Ward	James Beehag	Freeholder, Marsh Street, West Botany.
West Botany Ward	Elias Godfrey	Gardener, West Botany Street, West Botany.
West Botany Ward	Charles Napper	Freeholder, West Botany.
Auditors	Isaac Beehag	Freeholder, Beach Street, West Botany.
Auditors	John Beaumont Mills	Teacher, Arncliffe.

On 28 February 1871, Frederick Keene was appointed the first Clerk. Thomas Willmot was appointed Clerk on 13 August 1872. Thomas Leeder was appointed Clerk on 7 August 1877. Percival Somerville was appointed Clerk on 23 March 1905. On 17 December 1886, West Botany Ward was split in two, adding Rockdale Ward and Scarborough Ward and bringing the number of Aldermen from six to nine. Among the main developers during this period was Frederick Jamison Gibbes, a member of parliament whose name is perpetuated by Gibbes Street in Banksia. From 1872, Council met in the first Council Chambers, a small purpose-built stone building on the western side of Rocky Point Road, Arncliffe built by Christopher Bush of St Peters. It continued in use until 11 December 1888, when a new Town Hall was opened by the mayor, William George Judd, on the corner of Rocky Point Road and Bryant Street, Rockdale. The old Council Chambers building was eventually sold in 1904.

=== Rockdale Municipality ===
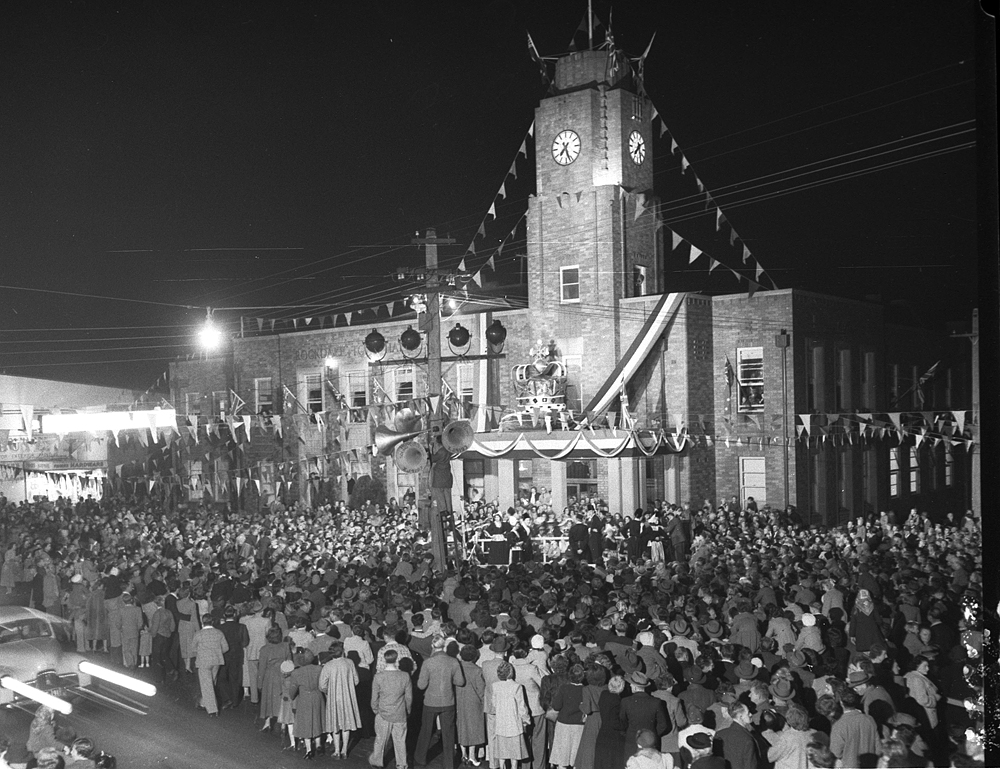
The second Rockdale Town Hall (1940), built on the site of the first Town Hall, on 2 June 1953 during celebrations for the Coronation of Queen Elizabeth II.

The name "Rockdale" for the West Botany area was first suggested in 1878, and that name gained more credence when the local railway station on the new Illawarra rail line, opened on 15 October 1884, was also given the name Rockdale. However, by the time the neighbouring Boroughs of Botany and North Botany (Mascot from 1911) were proclaimed on 29 March 1888, it was clear that a name change was desirable. On 17 May 1888 the Parliament of New South Wales passed the Rockdale Municipality Naming Act (No.33, 1888), and West Botany became the "Municipal District of Rockdale". On 31 December 1900, a fourth ward was added, Hopetoun Ward, named after the soon-to-be first Governor-General of Australia, bringing the number of aldermen to twelve. The 1887 Town Hall was replaced by the current Rockdale Town Hall in 1940, and was designed by Rockdale architect Douglas Gardiner.

The area of the municipality was reduced when the mouth of Cooks River was moved further south of its original position in the mid-1940s, to allow for the extension of Sydney Airport at Mascot. Under the Local Government (Areas) Act 1948, the Municipality of Bexley, which was located immediately to the West and had separated from Hurstville in 1900, became the First Ward of Rockdale Municipality. Rockdale was declared a city in 1995 as the "City of Rockdale".

=== 2002 corruption inquiry ===
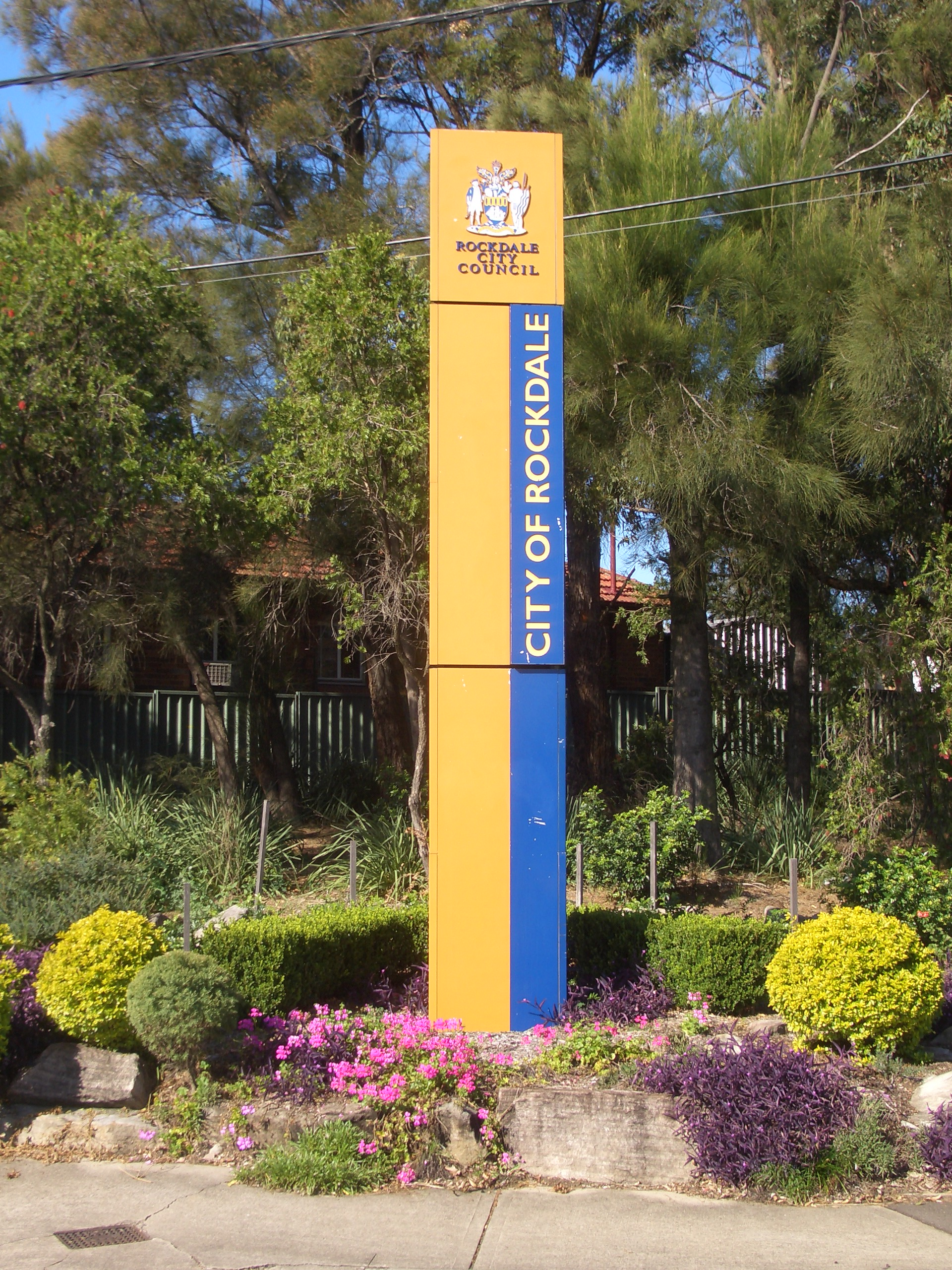
City of Rockdale signpost, Stoney Creek Road, Kingsgrove

During 2002, two elected officials of Rockdale City Council were at the centre of an Independent Commission Against Corruption (ICAC) inquiry. The inquiry revealed that the deputy mayor, Adam McCormick (Labor) and Councillor Andrew Smyrnis (Liberal) engaged in corrupt conduct with two property developers Con Chartofillis and Terry Andriotakis via two intermediaries, Manuel Limberis and Tony Retsos. The ICAC recommended to the New South Wales Office of the Director of Public Prosecutions (DPP) that charges be laid against all six individuals under the Crimes Act 1900 (NSW) and the ICAC Act 1998 (NSW) s 87. Both councillors resigned from council and a by-election was held on 31 August 2002 to replace the two disgraced councillors.

Following consideration of the briefs and evidence involved, the DPP commenced action. It was successful in recording convictions, and the known determinations made by the Courts are as follows:

- Smyrnis was sentenced to two years periodic detention.
- Retsos was fined $80,000 and sentenced to three years periodic detention.
- McCormick, protested his innocence; with Smyrnis agreeing to testify against him. McCormick was sentenced to a maximum of five years in custody for receiving $70,000 in bribes in return for delivering Labor Party support for a development application and for lying to the inquiry.

=== Amalgamation ===
A 2015 review of local government boundaries by the NSW Government Independent Pricing and Regulatory Tribunal recommended that the City of Botany Bay merge with the City of Rockdale to form a new council with an area of 50 square kilometres (19 sq mi) and support a population of approximately 153,000. In response to the merger proposal, Rockdale Council indicated their preference to merge with the City of Kogarah and the City of Hurstville, forming a single "St George Council".

With the proclamation of the majority of council amalgamations on 12 May 2016, Botany Bay Council appealed the decision in the Supreme Court of New South Wales, thereby delaying the proposed amalgamation until a decision was made by the Court. The Supreme Court rejected the appeal in early September 2016, and the Minister for Local Government, Paul Toole, moved quickly to proclaim the formation of Bayside Council on 9 September 2016, with the general manager of Rockdale since 2011, Meredith Wallace, appointed as the new general manager of Bayside Council. On 9 September 2017, the first council consisting of fifteen councillors across 5 wards was elected, and the former mayor of Rockdale, Bill Saravinovski, was elected as the first mayor on 27 September.

== Demographics ==
At the 2011 Census, there were 97,340 people in the Rockdale local government area, of these 49.4% were male and 50.6% were female. Aboriginal and Torres Strait Islander people made up 0.6% of the population. The median age of people in the City of Rockdale was 36 years. Children aged 0 – 14 years made up 17.4% of the population and people aged 65 years and over made up 15.1% of the population. Of people in the area aged 15 years and over, 50.9% were married and 10.8% were either divorced or separated.

Population growth in the City of Rockdale between the 2001 Census and the 2006 Census was 5.09%; and in the subsequent five years to the 2011 Census, population growth was 5.66%. When compared with total population growth of Australia for the same periods, being 5.78% and 8.32% respectively, population growth in the Rockdale local government area was on par with the national average. The median weekly income for residents within the City of Rockdale was on par with the national average.

The proportion of residents who stated their ancestry was Macedonian was 6.5 times the New South Wales and national averages; the proportion of households where Macedonian is spoken at home is in excess of eight times the state and national averages; and the proportion of residents who stated an affiliation with Eastern Orthodox religion was in excess of six times the state and national averages.

Selected historical census data for Rockdale local government area
Census year		2001	2006	2011
Population	Estimated residents on Census night	87,657	92,126	97,340
Population	LGA rank in terms of size within New South Wales			
Population	% of New South Wales population			1.41%
Population	% of Australian population	0.47%	▼0.46%	▼0.45%
Cultural and language diversity				
Ancestry, top responses	Australian			12.4%
Ancestry, top responses	English			12.2%
Ancestry, top responses	Chinese			10.0%
Ancestry, top responses	Greek			9.2%
Ancestry, top responses	Lebanese			6.1%
Language, top responses (other than English)	Greek	9.7%	▼9.4%	▼9.2%
Language, top responses (other than English)	Arabic	8.3%	▲9.0%	9.0%
Language, top responses (other than English)	Mandarin	3.2%	▲4.3%	▲5.1%
Language, top responses (other than English)	Macedonian	6.3%	▼5.4%	▼5.0%
Language, top responses (other than English)	Cantonese	4.5%	4.5%	▲4.6%
Religious affiliation				
Religious affiliation, top responses	Catholic	25.6%	▼24.2%	▼23.3%
Religious affiliation, top responses	Eastern Orthodox	19.2%	▼18.9%	▼18.3%
Religious affiliation, top responses	No religion	9.5%	▲11.2%	▲13.7%
Religious affiliation, top responses	Islam	8.2%	▲9.7%	▲10.6%
Religious affiliation, top responses	Anglican	12.9%	▼10.3%	▼8.6%
Median weekly incomes				
Personal income	Median weekly personal income		A$457	A$555
Personal income	% of Australian median income		98.1%	96.2%
Family income	Median weekly family income		A$1,035	A$1,443
Family income	% of Australian median income		100.8%	97.4%
Household income	Median weekly household income		A$1,163	A$1,276
Household income	% of Australian median income		99.3%	103.4%

== Council ==
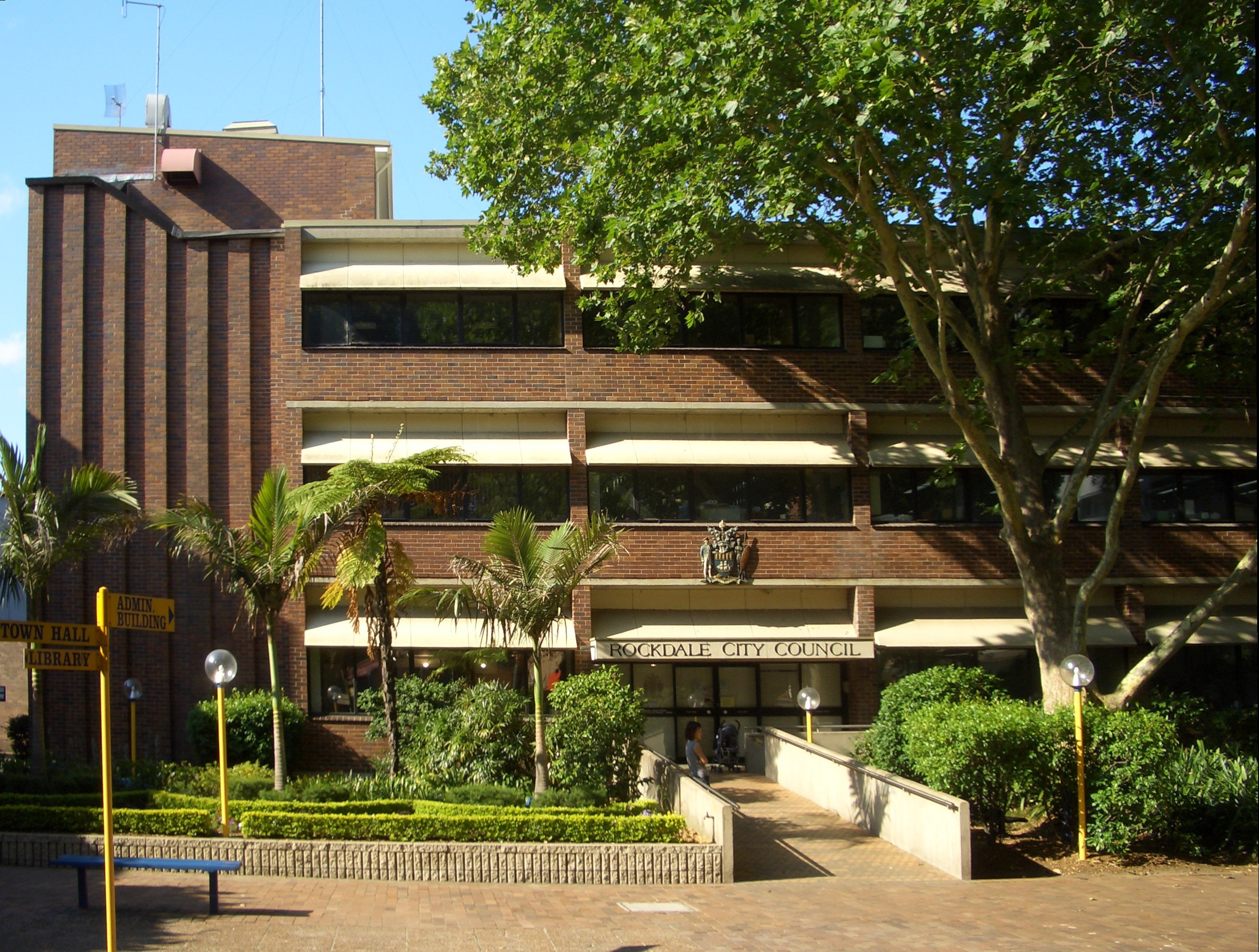
Rockdale City Council administration building

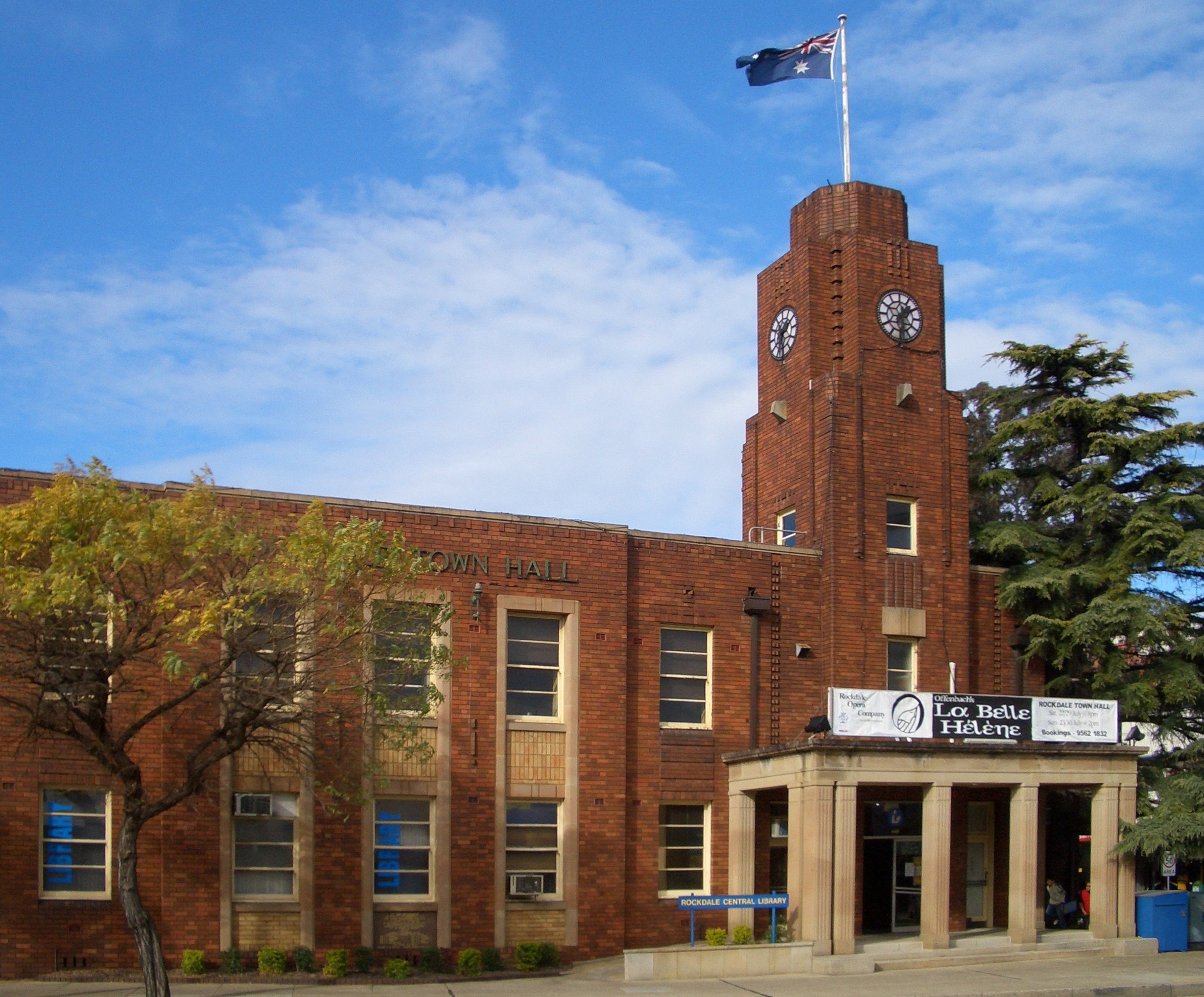
Rockdale City Council Town Hall

=== Final composition and election method ===
Rockdale City Council was composed of fifteen councillors elected proportionally as five separate wards, each electing three councillors. All councillors were elected for a fixed four-year term of office. The mayor was elected by the councillors at the first meeting of the council. The last election was held on 8 September 2012, and the final makeup of the council was as follows:

Ward	Councillor	Party	Notes
First Ward	Andrew Tsounis	Labor	
First Ward	Peter Poulos	Liberal	Deputy Mayor 2008–2009
First Ward	Mark Hanna	Independent	
Second Ward	Tarek Ibrahim	Labor	Elected to Bayside Mascot Ward, 2016.
Second Ward	Nicholas Mickovski	Liberal	
Second Ward	Michael Nagi	Independent	Deputy Mayor 2015–2016. Elected to Bayside Mascot Ward, 2016.
Third Ward	Petros Kalligas	Liberal	Elected to Bayside Rockdale Ward, 2016.
Third Ward	Lydia Sedrak	Liberal	
Third Ward	Bill Saravinovski	Labor	Mayor 1995-1996, 2006-2007, 2008-2009, 2010-2012, 2015–2016. Deputy Mayor 2005–2006 Sep-Dec 2009. Elected to Bayside Rockdale Ward, 2016.
Fourth Ward	Liz Barlow	Independent	Deputy Mayor 2002–2004 2012–2015. Elected to Bayside Bexley Ward, 2016.
Fourth Ward	Paul Sedrak	Liberal	Elected to Bayside Port Botany Ward, 2016.
Fourth Ward	Joe Awada	Labor	Elected to Bayside Bexley Ward, 2016.
Fifth Ward	Ron Bezic	Liberal	Elected to Bayside Bexley Ward, 2016.
Fifth Ward	Shane O'Brien	Labor	Mayor 2012–2015
Fifth Ward	James Macdonald	Independent	Deputy Mayor 2010–2011. Elected to Bayside Botany Bay Ward, 2016.

== Mayors ==
Mayor	Party	Term	Notes
William Yates	Independent	14 February 1871 – 15 February 1872	
James Beehag	Independent	15 February 1872 – 11 February 1874	
Elias Godfrey	Independent	11 February 1874 – 10 February 1875	
James Beehag	Independent	10 February 1875 – 12 February 1877	
James Collins	Independent	12 February 1877 – 12 February 1878	
John Bowmer	Independent	12 February 1878 – 7 February 1885	
William George Judd	Independent	7 February 1885 – 31 July 1889	
Edwin Godfrey	Independent	31 July 1889 – 12 February 1891	
Alfred George Carruthers	Independent	12 February 1891 – 2 May 1892	
William Taylor	Independent	2 May 1892 – 12 February 1895	
John Horatio Clayton	Independent	12 February 1895 – February 1898	
William George Judd	Independent	February 1898 – 5 March 1900	
John Francis Hegerty	Independent	5 March 1900 – 12 February 1902	
Joseph Henry Trevarthen	Independent	12 February 1902 – 11 February 1904	
William Taylor	Independent	11 February 1904 – February 1909	
Henry George Broe	Independent	February 1909 – 12 February 1914	
William Monahan KC	Independent	12 February 1914 – 1 February 1917	
Alfred Edward Green	Independent	8 February 1917 – July 1918	
Henry George Broe	Independent	July 1918 – 16 July 1920	
George Edward Fortescue	Independent	July 1920 – December 1926	
Edward John Gardiner	Independent	December 1926 – 6 December 1928	
Ernest George Barton	Independent	6 December 1928 – 6 December 1934	
Frederick William Beehag	Independent	6 December 1934 – 27 April 1939	
John Banks Burrows	Independent	4 May 1939 – 2 December 1940	
George James McGuire	Independent	2 December 1940 – 11 December 1941	
Enoch Jones	Independent	11 December 1941 – December 1946	
Norman Cecil Guess	Independent	December 1946 – 22 December 1948	
Enoch Jones	Independent	22 December 1948 – 14 December 1953	
Ronald Thorneycroft Gosling MBE	Independent	14 December 1953 – December 1956	
		–	
Ronald William Rathbone	Independent	December 1968 – September 1972	
		September 1972 – September 1980	
Ronald William Rathbone	Independent	September 1980 – September 1983	
Phil Lang	Labor	September 1983 – September 1984	
		September 1984 – September 1985	
Ronald William Rathbone OAM	Independent	September 1985 – September 1987	
Steve Holroyd		September 1987 – September 1989	
		September 1989 – September 1992	
Ronald William Rathbone OAM	Independent	September 1992 – September 1993	
		September 1993 – September 1994	
Ronald William Rathbone OAM	Independent	September 1994 – September 1995	
Bill Saravinovski	Labor	September 1995 – September 1996	
Peter Bryant		September 1996 – September 1997	
Brian Simpson		September 1997 – September 1998	
Geoff Hedge		September 1998 – September 1999	
Kent Johns	Labor	September 1999 – September 2000	
Shaoquett Moselmane	Labor	September 2000 – September 2002	
Yvonne Bellamy	Independent	September 2002 – March 2004	
John Flowers	Liberal	April 2004 – September 2005	
Shaoquett Moselmane	Labor	September 2005 – September 2006	
Bill Saravinovski	Labor	September 2006 – September 2007	
John Flowers	Liberal	September 2007 – September 2008	
Bill Saravinovski	Labor	September 2008 – September 2009	
Shaoquett Moselmane	Labor	September 2009 – December 2009	
Bill Saravinovski	Labor	January 2010 – September 2012	
Shane O'Brien	Labor	September 2012 – 16 September 2015	
Bill Saravinovski	Labor	16 September 2015 – 9 September 2016	

== Library ==
Rockdale first tried to establish a library service in the late 1880s, with the council appointing the first Librarian, William Henry Hardwick, on 31 October 1890. The Rockdale Free Library was officially opened in the Town Hall by Sir Henry Parkes on 10 April 1893 with a modest collection of 200 books. This library, however did not see much use and by 1900 the library's books were described that they would go mouldy but for the moving they get when the attendant dusts them." Rockdale Council therefore resolved to divest council of the library and move the collection to the Rockdale School of Arts.

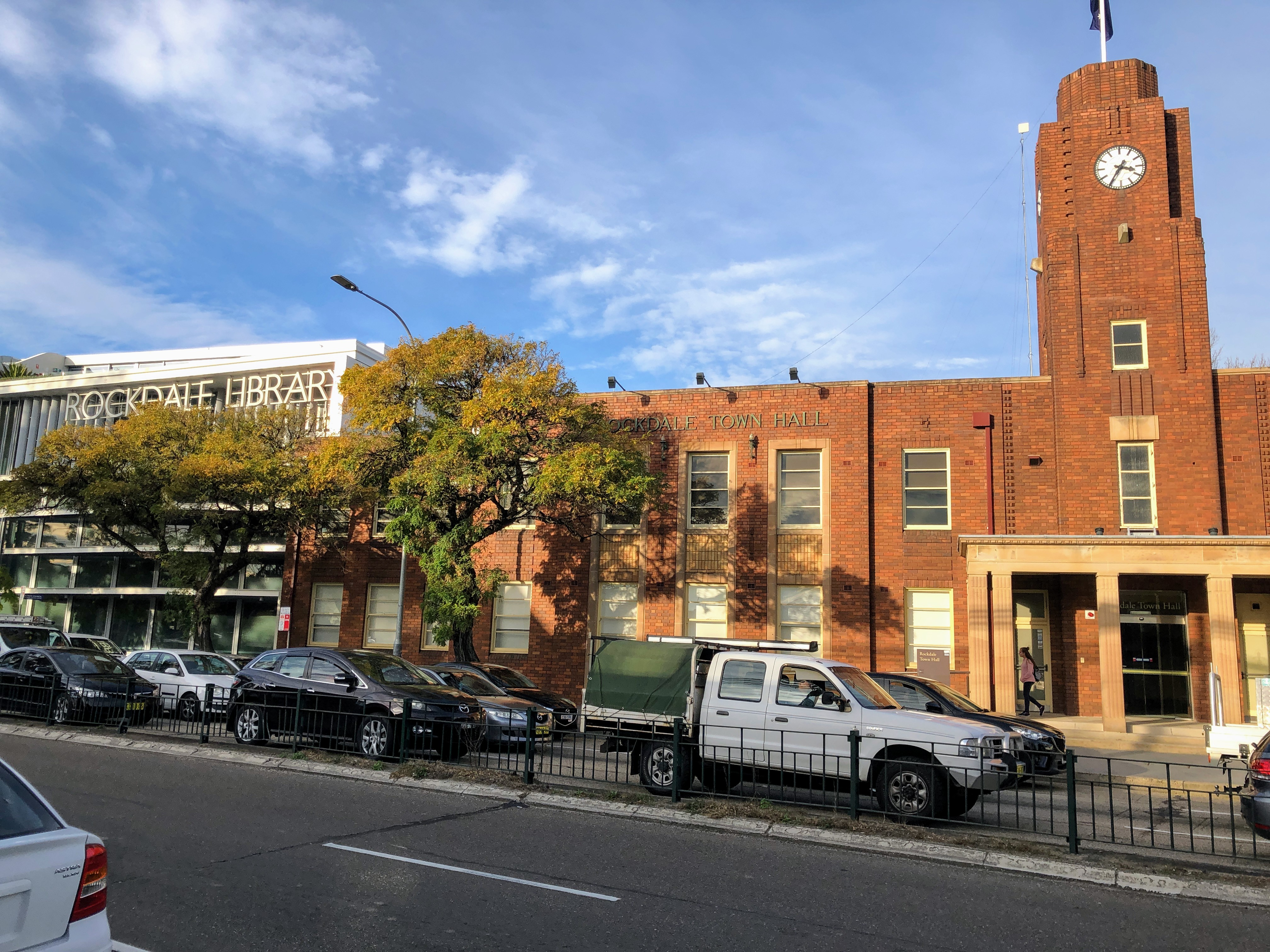
The new Rockdale Library (left) next to the Town Hall, opened in 2016.

Despite several attempts to recreate this library service, Rockdale Council did not devote any time to the project until 1954 when it decided to start a 'Mobile Library' service as a first act to gauge the level of public interest.

Beginning in November 1955, the Rockdale mobile library, with five stops and 9,500 books, was funded through a special library levy on ratepayers of 25 pence in the pound. With more than 2500 borrowers registered in the first five weeks, the demand required council to increase the number of stops from five to eleven and employ two extra library staff. This demand continued to grow and Rockdale moved to re-establish a permanent library, opening the first Rockdale library in February 1958 with a stock of 8,002 books. Located behind the Town Hall, in September 1983 the library building was demolished to make way for the Rockdale Council Administration Centre and the Town Hall was refurbished for the Rockdale Central Library opened in September 1984.

The Rockdale Central Library remained in the Town Hall in a northern wing dedicated for the purposed until this section was demolished to make way for a new library, designed by Brewster Hjorth Architects. The new Rockdale Library fronting the Princes Highway was officially opened on 30 July 2016 as the central library for the new Bayside Council.

== Coat of arms ==
Coat of arms of City of Rockdale

Notes
The arms of the City of Rockdale were granted in 1971 by the College of Arms and designed by H. Ellis Tomlinson.
Motto
"Crescit Eundo" (It thrives by progress)
Symbolism
The blue field and the gold wavy chief represent Botany Bay and the beaches of the municipality. The inclusion of Captain James Cook, who arrived at Botany Bay in 1770, as a supporter, and his ship the HM Bark Endeavour in the compartment is also in reference to this. The other supporter depicts the local Darug Aborigines. The Banksia flower was first seen here and named after Sir Joseph Banks, the Cook expedition's botanist. The five banksia flowers represent the five wards of the municipality in 1969 and the torch in the crest was the original seal of Rockdale. The two blue wings with stars refer to Kingsford Smith, Sydney's international airport. The compartment, with red sandstone 'rock' on a grassy 'dale' is a pun on the name of the City.

== Sister cities ==
- Takéo, Cambodia
- Tianjin, Tanggu, China
- Bitola, North Macedonia
- Glyfada, Greece
- (United States) Rockdale, Texas, US
- Bint Jbeil, Lebanon
- Yamatsuri, Fukushima, Japan
- Gilgandra, New South Wales, Australia
