= Shaoquett Moselmane =

Australian politician

Assistant President of the Legislative Council of New South Wales
- In office 7 May 2019 – 6 April 2020
- President: John Ajaka
- Preceded by: Fred Nile
- Succeeded by: Rod Roberts

Member of Legislative Council of New South Wales
- In office 3 December 2009 – 3 March 2023
- Preceded by: Henry Tsang

Mayor of Rockdale
- In office September 2009 – December 2009
- Preceded by: Bill Saravinovski
- Succeeded by: Bill Saravinovski
- In office September 2005 – September 2006
- Preceded by: John Flowers
- Succeeded by: Bill Saravinovski
- In office September 2000 – September 2002
- Preceded by: Kent Johns
- Succeeded by: Yvonne Bellamy

Personal details
- Born: 1965 (age 60–61) Konin, Lebanon
- Party: Australian Labor Party
- Spouse: Mika Fukuta Moselmane
- Children: Joseph Moselmane
- Education: The University of Sydney; Macquarie University; University of New South Wales
- Occupation: Solicitor
- Website: shaoquettmoselmane.com.au

Shaoquett Chaher Moselmane (born 1965) is an Australian former politician who was a member of the New South Wales Legislative Council from 2009 to 2023 as a member of the parliamentary New South Wales Labor Party. He was assistant president of the Legislative Council from May 2019 to April 2020.

== Early years and background ==
Moselmane was born in Konin, southern Lebanon. He arrived in Australia from Lebanon in 1977 with his parents, Chaher Mouslimani and Jawaher Mohanna Mouslimani, and ten siblings. He attended Rockdale Public School and James Cook Boys' High School before graduating with a Bachelor of Arts (politics and government administration) from the University of Sydney. He obtained a Master degree in politics from Macquarie University and went on to complete a Bachelor of Laws at the University of New South Wales. In 1999, Moselmane commenced practising as a solicitor.

== Political career ==
In 1995, Moselmane was elected to Rockdale City Council in Sydney's south and served as mayor from 2001 to 2003, from 2005 to 2006, and again in 2009 until his appointment to the Legislative Council. Moselmane retired from Rockdale Council at the 2012 NSW Local Government Elections.

On 3 December 2009, Moselmane was appointed to the Legislative Council to fill a vacancy created by the resignation of Henry Tsang. He was the first Muslim member of the New South Wales Parliament.

In September 2012, Moselmane instituted the Multicultural and Indigenous Media Awards and in June 2014, he launched the National Indigenous Human Rights Awards.

In May 2017, Moselmane and two other Labor MPs voted with the Shooters, Fishers and Farmers Party, the Liberal Party and National Party to defeat a bill to decriminalise abortion in the state.

On 7 May 2019, Shaoquett Moselmane was elected as Assistant President of the NSW Legislative Council. He lost Labor preselection at the 2023 New South Wales state election.

== Controversy ==
=== Palestine and Israel ===
In March 2013, Moselmane made a parliamentary speech in which he described Gaza as "the world's largest open-air prison camp" and praised resistance groups who fought against the Israeli occupation in Lebanon, comparing them to resistance against Nazi Germany. Israeli media said that his speech had "sparked uproar". Also in 2013, Moselmane made a speech in support of a motion by students at the University of Sydney asking the university to boycott the Israeli university Technion. Labor leader John Robertson said Moselmane's views were "not in accordance with Labor policy". In 2017 Moselmane retweeted former Ku Klux Klan leader David Duke. Labor MP Walt Secord, a member of the NSW Parliament's Friends of Israel group, also criticised the boycott proposal. The Australasian Muslim Times criticised the "witch-hunt by pro-Israel lobbyists because of [Moselmane's] proactive support for justice to Palestinians and South Lebanese against Israeli aggression".

=== China ===
In 2019 and 2020, Moselmane drew criticism for his links to figures connected with the Chinese Communist Party (CCP). The Sydney Morning Herald reported that Moselmane had hired John Zhang as a staff member in 2019. In 2013, Zhang attended a training course at the Chinese Academy of Governance, a high-level training institution for officials of the Chinese Communist Party. Dr Anthony Pun from the Chinese Community Council of Australia wrote a letter to Labor leader Jodi McKay in support of Moselmane saying, “we are indebted to the Hon Shaoquett Moselmane MLC, who have shown empathy and compassion to our difficulties, particularly to racists taunts, racially vilification and hate speech. He has shown a deep understanding of the Chinese Australian community that has won our hearts and to be called a “good friend” of the community".

In a February 2020 opinion piece published by the East China Normal University, Moselmane praised the Chinese government's response to the COVID-19 pandemic, and noted "the dregs of White Australianism from the past... are resurfacing to bring about a resurgence of the Yellow Peril mythology". In March 2020, Moselmane also praised Xi Jinping, General Secretary of the Chinese Communist Party, for his "unswerving leadership" in responding to the COVID-19 pandemic and said that the "combined phenomenal effort of the state and the people in the fight to contain the virus was breath taking". He compared the Chinese response to the Australian government response which he described as "slow, and at times baffling and confused". McKay criticised the comment as "inappropriate" while Stephen Conroy and Federal Minister for Home Affairs Peter Dutton called for Moselmane's resignation. Following criticism of his remarks, Moselmane resigned his position as assistant president of the NSW Legislative Council in April 2020.

On 26 June 2020, Moselmane's home in Sydney was searched by Australian Federal Police as part of an investigation by the Australian Security Intelligence Organisation (ASIO) into allegations that his office had been infiltrated by covert Chinese government agents. His car was also searched. McKay described the allegations as "dreadfully concerning". Moselmane was subsequently suspended from the New South Wales Labor Party. Writing in the CCP-owned Global Times tabloid, Chen Hong, professor and director of the Australian Studies Centre, East China Normal University, said that Moselmane had become a scapegoat. On 8 September 2020, ABC News reported that four senior Chinese journalists and academics were drawn into the investigation, including the Australia bureau chief of China News Service, Tao Shelan; China Radio International's Sydney bureau chief Li Dayong; prominent Chinese scholar and media commentator Professor Chen Hong; and another leading Australian studies scholar, Li Jianjun. Chinese media accused Australia of "severely infring[ing] on the legitimate rights of Chinese journalists" and "hypocrisy in upholding so-called 'freedom of the press'". It said the investigation "proved that the Chinese journalists did not engage in activities incompatible with their identities".

Moselmane took leave from the NSW parliament in June while the investigation was being conducted. He returned to parliament on 22 October 2020 after being cleared by the Parliamentary Privileges Committee. He stated that he had not been questioned in the four months since his house was searched in June and that "I have never [been] accused of any wrongdoing. No charges laid against me, and no allegations of any criminal offence have been directed to me". In November 2020, a former policy adviser to Moselmane, John Zhang, was reported to be under investigation for money laundering and serving as an agent of foreign influence. In November 2020, Moselmane was reinstated in the Labor Party.
