= NSW Premier's Multicultural Communication Awards =

The NSW Premier's Multicultural Communication Awards (PCMAs), formerly Multicultural Media Awards, Multicultural and Indigenous Media Awards (MIMA) and NSW Premier's Multicultural Media Awards, are Australian journalism awards held each year at New South Wales Parliament.

== History ==
The Multicultural Media Awards were founded by Lebanese-born Australian Parliamentarian Shaoquett Moselmane. They were established in 2012 to recognise outstanding journalism covering multicultural issues in Australia. To clarify an equal onus on Indigenous media, the awards were formally amended in 2014 to include Indigenous in the title.

In 2017 they were called the NSW Premier's Multicultural Media Awards, and in 2022 the name was NSW Premier's Multicultural Communication Awards.

== Description ==
According to the website as of September 2022, the NSW Premier's Multicultural Communications Awards, or PMCAs, "recognise excellence in the multicultural media and marketing industry".

== Media Awards 2012 ==
- Journalist of the Year - joint winners: Pawan Luthra and Majida Abboud
- Coverage of Community Affairs Abroad - Tammy Lee
- Coverage of Indigenous Affairs - Gerry Georgatos (National Indigenous Times)
- Editorial/News Reporting - Pawan Luthra
- Investigative Reporting/Feature Writing - Gerry Georgatos
- Contribution to Social Inclusion and Multiculturalism - Lina Lee
- Photographer of the Year - Jojo Lee
- Online Innovation in News Blog or News Website Design - Pawan Luthra

== Media Awards 2013 ==
- Journalist of the Year - Gerry Georgatos
- Coverage of Community Affairs in Australia - Linna Lee
- Coverage of Indigenous Affairs - Gerry Georgatos
- Investigative Reporting - Gerry Georgatos
- Photographer of the Year - Jojo Lee
- Online Coverage - Steve Giannakouras
- Feature Writing - Helen Velissanis
- News Reporting - Tammy Lee
- Contribution to Social Inclusion - Jan Smith
- Online Innovation of News Blog or News Website Design - Pawan and Rajni Luthra
- Editorial Cartoon - Joel Mapayo
- Hall of Fame - Syed Zafar Hussain Shah

== Media Awards 2014 ==
- Journalist of the Year - joint winners: Malarndirri McCarthy and Kumud Merani
- Editorial Reporting - joint winners: Marcus Woolombi Waters and Gerry Georgatos
- Photographer of the Year - joint winners: Romeo Cayabyab and Freedy Handa
- News Reporting - joint winners: Geoff Bagnall and Maja Jovic
- Coverage of Community Affairs - Lok Hei Lai
- Online News Coverage - Mohamad Taha
- Hall of Fame - Paolo Rajo

== Media Awards 2015 ==
- Journalist of the Year - Natalie Ahmat
- Coverage of Community Affairs - Violi Calvert
- Young Journalist of the Year - Arijit Banarjee
- Photographer of the Year - Sachin Wakhare
- New Reporting - Pawan Luthra
- Online News Coverage - Shant Soghomonian
- Editorial Reporting - Margherita Angelucci
- Encouragement Award - Natalie Sukkarieh
- Hall of Fame - Anwar Harb
- Hall of Fame - Sachin Wakhare

== Media Awards 2016 ==
- Journalist of the Year - Susana Lolohea and Usha Arvind
- Young Journalist of the Year - Nami Gohil
- Coverage of Community Affairs - Raymond Selvaraj
- Editorial Reporting - Mike Sweet
- News Reporting - Laura Murphy-Oates
- Online News Coverage - Ana Sevo
- Photographer of the Year - Nerses Baliozian
