= Lady Robinsons Beach =

Beach in Sydney, Australia

- Beach
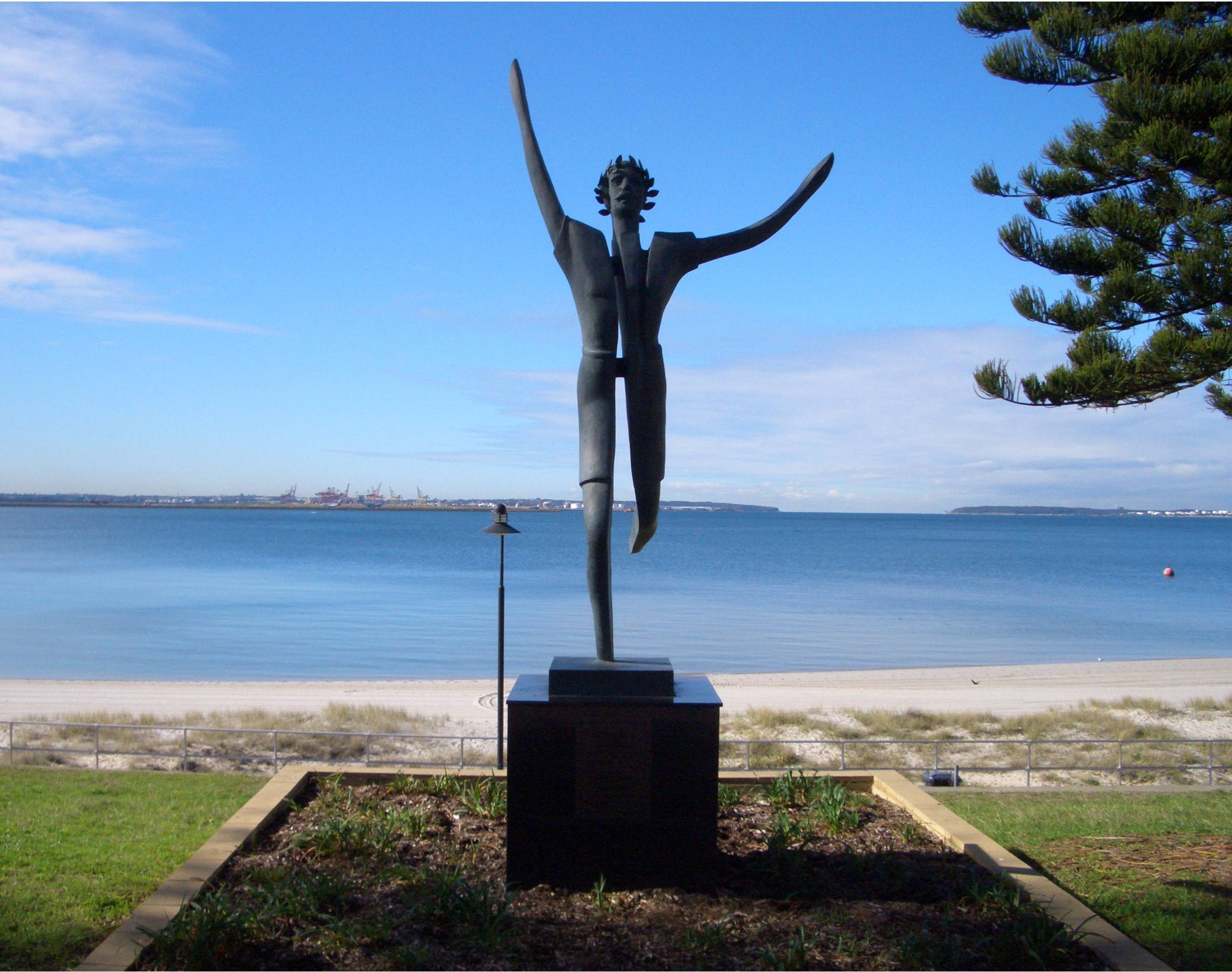
- First Fleet monument in Brighton-Le-Sands beach
- Interactive map of Lady Robinsons Beach
- Coordinates: 33°58′31″S 151°09′03″E
- Location: St. George
- Water bodies: Botany Bay

Dimensions
  - Length: 5 kilometres (3.1 mi)
- Hazard rating: 1/10 (least hazardous)
- Access: The Grand Parade

Lady Robinsons Beach is the stretch of beach between the mouth of the Cooks River and the mouth of Georges River on the western shore of Botany Bay in Sydney, New South Wales, Australia. Originally known as Seven Mile Beach, it was renamed after the wife of the then Governor, Sir Hercules Robinson. Isolated settlements separated from the beach by sand dunes were also given the name of Lady Robinson's Beach as their postal address.

Being Sydney's longest beach, Lady Robinsons Beach is the eastern boundary of the area known as the St George District. It is also the eastern boundary of the Municipality of Rockdale and of the suburbs of Kyeemagh, Brighton-Le-Sands, Monterey, Ramsgate Beach, Sans Souci, Dolls Point and Sandringham.

== Geology ==
Lady Robinsons Beach was formed by the erosion of the Hawkesbury sandstone which is still evident as rocky outcrops and cliffs located 1-3 kilometres west of the beach. The sand of the beach and its dunes is a pale yellow, almost white at parts (such as in Dolls Point), and is fine-grained. Nonetheless, it is the whitest beach in the Sydney area.

The beach is limited to the north and to the south by the Wianamatta shale through which the Cooks River and Georges River and their tributaries have carved their lower reaches and mouths. Marshes form and mangroves grow in the eroded shale. These marshes and mangroves restricted access from the north to what became the St George district south of Cooks River. In the early years of settlement these marshes caused numerous other problems for the nearby suburbs. These two types of rock form an integral part of the geological entity, the Sydney Basin SydneyBasin.

== Beaches ==
Lady Robinsons Beach has a number of prominent beaches on its stretch (from north to south):

- Kyeemagh Beach Baths
- Brighton-Le-Sands Beach
- Kite Beach, Monterey
- Ramsgate Beach
- Dolls Point Beach

== Ecology ==
The underwater sand flats adjacent to the beach were the habitat of a number of mollusc species, including sand-snails (Uber species), wedge-pipis (Amesodesma species) and Bankivia. Their shells littered the beach. After their habitat was destroyed by a storm in 1966 these species disappeared. The shells found on the beach after this disaster were those of molluscs inhabiting the mudflats of the Georges River and southern part of Botany Bay. These include the Sydney cockle (Anadara trapezia), the large Sydney whelk also known as the Hercules club shell (Pyrazus australis) and a similar, smaller whelk, (Velacumantis ebininus).

Before the third runway of Sydney Airport was extended in the late 1950s, nereid worms were abundant on sand flats at the northern end of the beach. These sand flats were covered with very shallow water which warmed in the sun during daylight hours, encouraging the colourful worms to emerge from their burrows.

== History ==
=== 1770—1880 ===
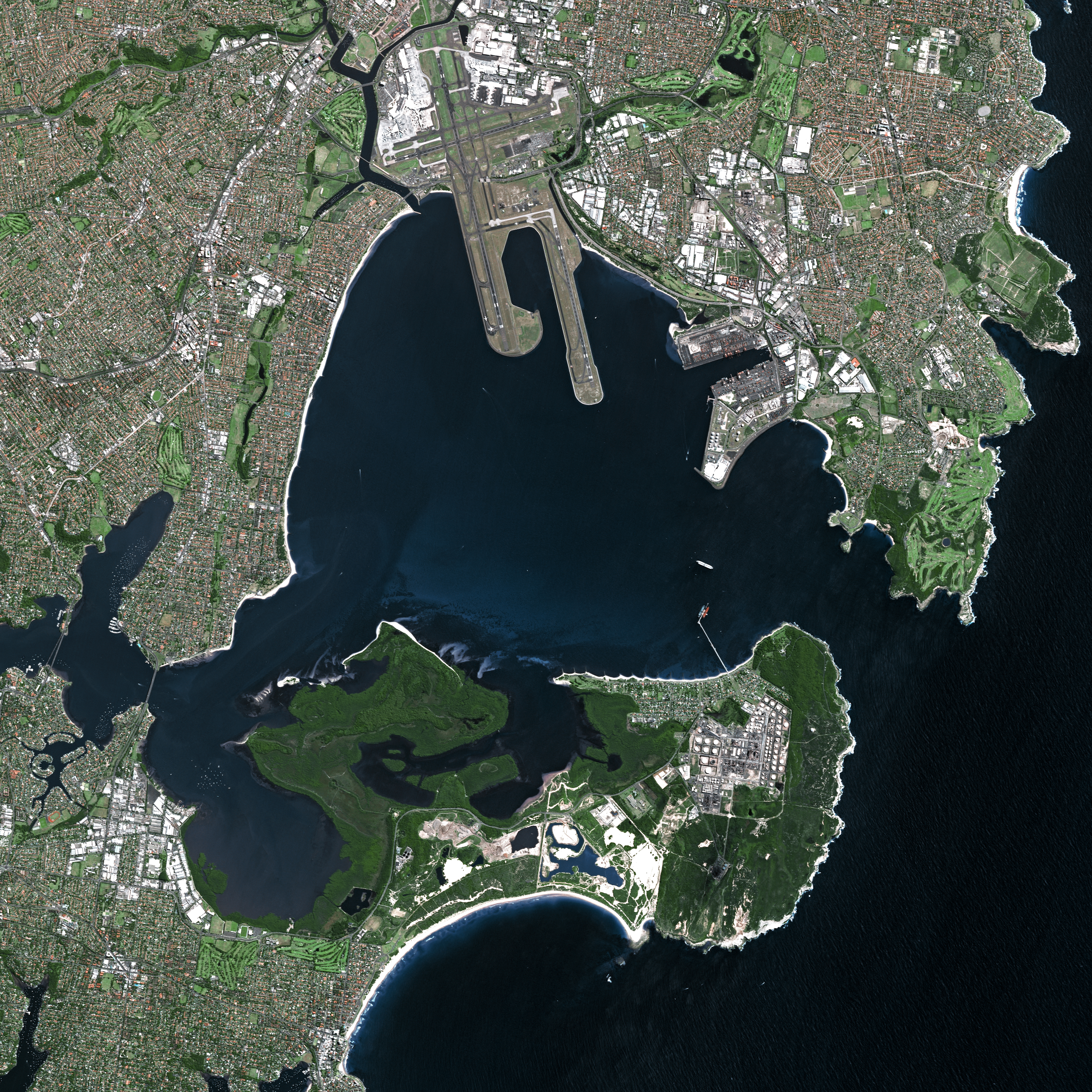
Lady Robinsons Beach is approximately 5 km long, starting from Kyeemagh in the north to Sandringham in the south. It is located on the western shores of Botany Bay, or to the left of Sydney Airport on the map.

Although they didn't land there, this beach is one of the first landmarks that Captain James Cook and his crew in 1770, and later Captain Arthur Phillip and his crew in 1788, would have seen as they sailed through the mouth of Botany Bay. In 1839 a dam with a carriageway was constructed across the Cooks River from what are now Tempe to Arncliffe. This dam remained the major access to the district south of the river for approximately the next fifty years. About five years later Rocky Point Road was built from the tiny settlement south of the dam to Rocky Point on Georges River. This new road meant land access was now closer to Seven Mile Beach.

It took longer still for the pioneers to cut their way further east to reach the coast and Seven Mile Beach. Timber harvesting assisted in pushing tracks through to the coast. When land grants were eventually made in the area it was found that for most of the land the scrub was difficult to clear and that the deep sandy soil was unsuitable for agriculture or grazing. The land was deemed suitable for pig-farming, poultry-farming and their associated industries. Also, swamps were soon found to exist only about one kilometre inland from the beach. By contrast, at the northern end of the area, Muddy Creek overflowed frequently, leaving behind a much richer alluvial soil which was suitable for the growing of vegetables. Market gardening along the eastern bank of Muddy Creek continued for over 130 years.

The abundance of shells on the beach meant the establishment of lime-burning facilities. Fishing in the area was very good in the relatively sheltered bay. Small settlements soon developed close to the beach.

In 1871 Rockdale was made a municipality. Local government assumed much of the responsibility for management of the district, including the settlements along the foreshore of the bay, collectively known as Lady Robinson's Beach. The opening of Rockdale Station on the new railway line in 1884 heralded considerable expansion for the coastline of the bay. Two roads linked Rocky Point Road to the beach: Bay Street to New Brighton and Sandringham Street (built in 1875 and gravelled in 1877) which led to a foreshore hotel near Dolls Point. In the mid-1880s Bestic Street, west of Muddy Creek and Goodes Road to its east were linked by a bridge over the creek and the road was extended to reach the beach. Initially Bestic Street was proposed as the site of the tramway. Instead the tramway was built along Bay Street, further extending access to the beach. At the beginning of this era the region was deemed to be semi-rural; but, during its last few years, the locale was up-graded to suburban status).

=== Modern history ===
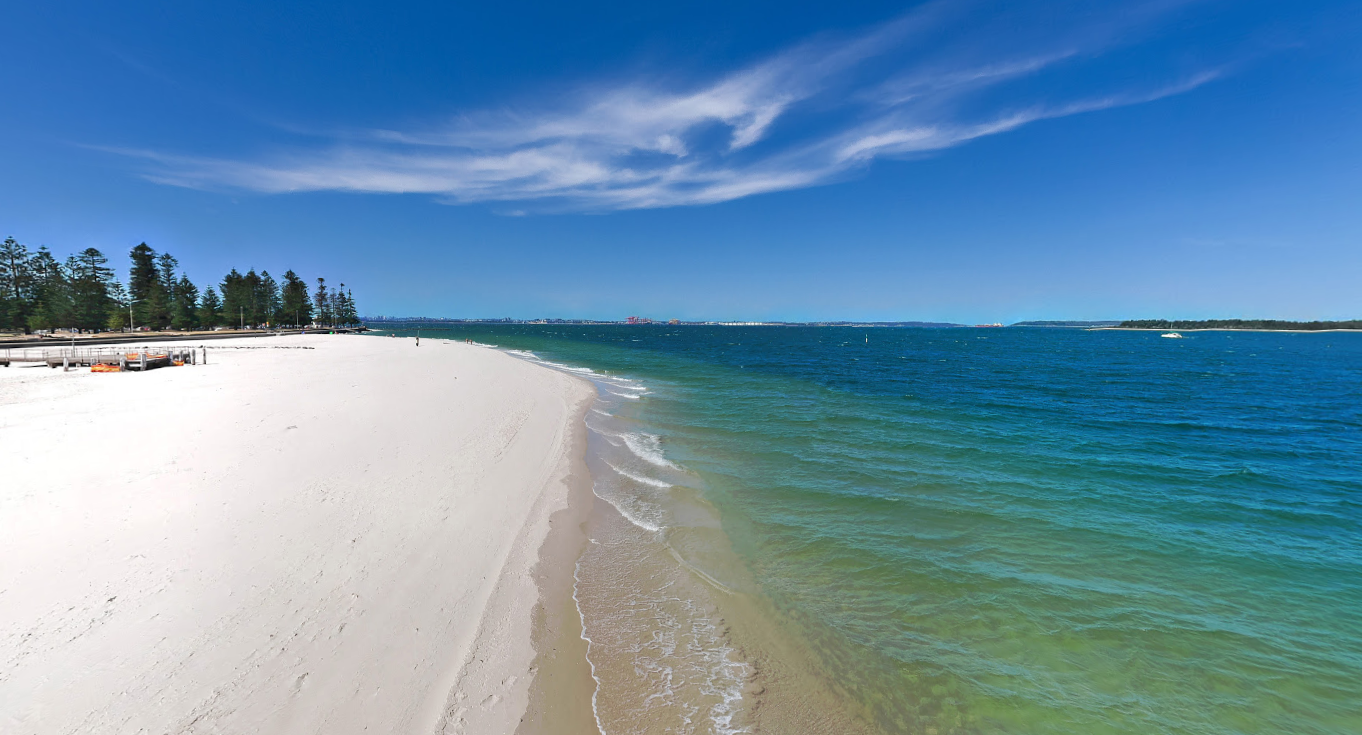
Dolls Point, which is situated in the southern periphery of Lady Robinsons Beach, on the mouth of Georges River.

When the Sydney postal service was extended to Rockdale the settlements along the coastline were collectively included in the Rockdale postal district, with the name of their sub-district, Lady Robinsons Beach, enclosed in brackets. At a later date the postal sub-district of Brighton-le-Sands (attached to the postal district of Rockdale) was extended to include the whole area from Cooks River to Sandringham Road. Gradually, over time, these settlements along the coastline increased in size until each was given its own post office and independent suburban status. The first of these were Brighton-le-Sands and Sandringham separated by President Avenue. Now there is contiguous development along the full length of the coastline. From north to south these suburbs are Kyeemagh, Brighton-Le-Sands, Monterey, Ramsgate Beach and Dolls Point.

Between Lady Robinsons Beach and The Grande Parade, which has housing along its western border only, lies Cook Park. Initially Grand Parade (as The Grand Parade is popularly called) ran north from Bay Street, Brighton-le-Sands to Selwood Street. Later the road was extended further north to Bestic Street. The Esplanade ran south from Bay Street, Brighton-le-Sands along the coast line to Burlington Street. Later The Esplanade was extended to Sandringham Street, Ramsgate (now Ramsgate Beach). Eventually the entire road from Bestic Street in the north to Sandringham Street in the south was named The Grand Parade.

The swimming baths at Brighton-le-Sands remained the only sea baths along this beach for over 60 years. In the 1950s the Cook Park Camp at Kyeemagh was closed and the high sand dunes were cleared so that a second swimming baths could be built. These baths also catered to people of the Mascot/Botany area as they could travel to the park by bus. Earlier the Kyeemagh sand dunes had also been used extensively for sand-boarding (sliding down the face of a dune on a polished wooden board). In the mid-1930s at Ramsgate, a recreation ground comprising a zoo and baths (concrete pools) suitable for competitive swimming and for the teaching of swimming and a toddlers' pool were constructed at the corner of Grand Parade and Ramsgate Road. When these baths were sold and a shopping precinct was erected on the site in the mid-1970s sea baths were built at the nearby beach and Cook Park in the area was developed as a picnic site.

In the mid-1940s it was decided to build a third runway for the Sydney Airport. This runway was to jut out into Botany Bay at the position of the mouth of the Cooks River. It took several years to relocate the mouth of the river to its current position and to landfill the former mouth of the river. This relocating of the mouth of the river allowed for widening and deepening of the mouth of the river and the now adjacent mouth of the river's tributary, Muddy Creek. The widened and deepened mouth of Muddy Creek was renamed Kyeemagh Canal. One consequence of this change in position of the mouth of the river also meant the shortening of and other modifications to Lady Robinsons Beach. The changes in Muddy Creek allowed boating facilities and so the Brighton Fishermans Club ( formerly the Brighton-le-Sands Amateur Fishmans Club) was formed.

== Incidents ==
Although regarded as a safe beach with a low hazard rating of 2, Dolls Point Beach has had a few incidents, such as the drowning of two young men in 2007 and a 5-year-old boy in 2013, and a near-drowning of an 8-year-old girl in 2015. As a result of these incidents, the locals called for the City of Rockdale to prohibit swimming at the hazardous section and install warning signs, with more than 4000 people signing a petition on change.org.

Consequentially, new signs were installed, encouraging people to swim in netted areas only as the nearby sand banks can create the semblance that waters are shallow, when there is actually a deep river channel with a strong current, which is the part of the beach that is deceptively dangerous with shifting sands, a big drop-off and rips. The Council said these incidents were caused by the staunch changes to the beach through erosion and sand build-up along the beachfront on Botany Bay, since the construction of the third runway at Sydney Airport. Lady Robinsons Beach has not been identified as a coastal erosion hotspot, due to the fact that there are no houses in the area that are threatened.

In January 2019, at the netted Brighton-Le-Sands beach, a shark was spotted swimming near the shore, causing a commotion among families with children. Bayside Council confirmed that the divers discovered a hole in the netting, which was then repaired by the next morning and the net was taken away to be investigated.

== Gallery ==
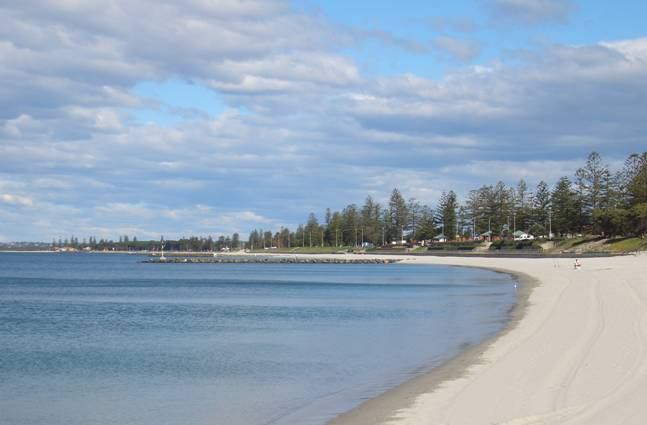
Lady Robinsons Beach, Monterey

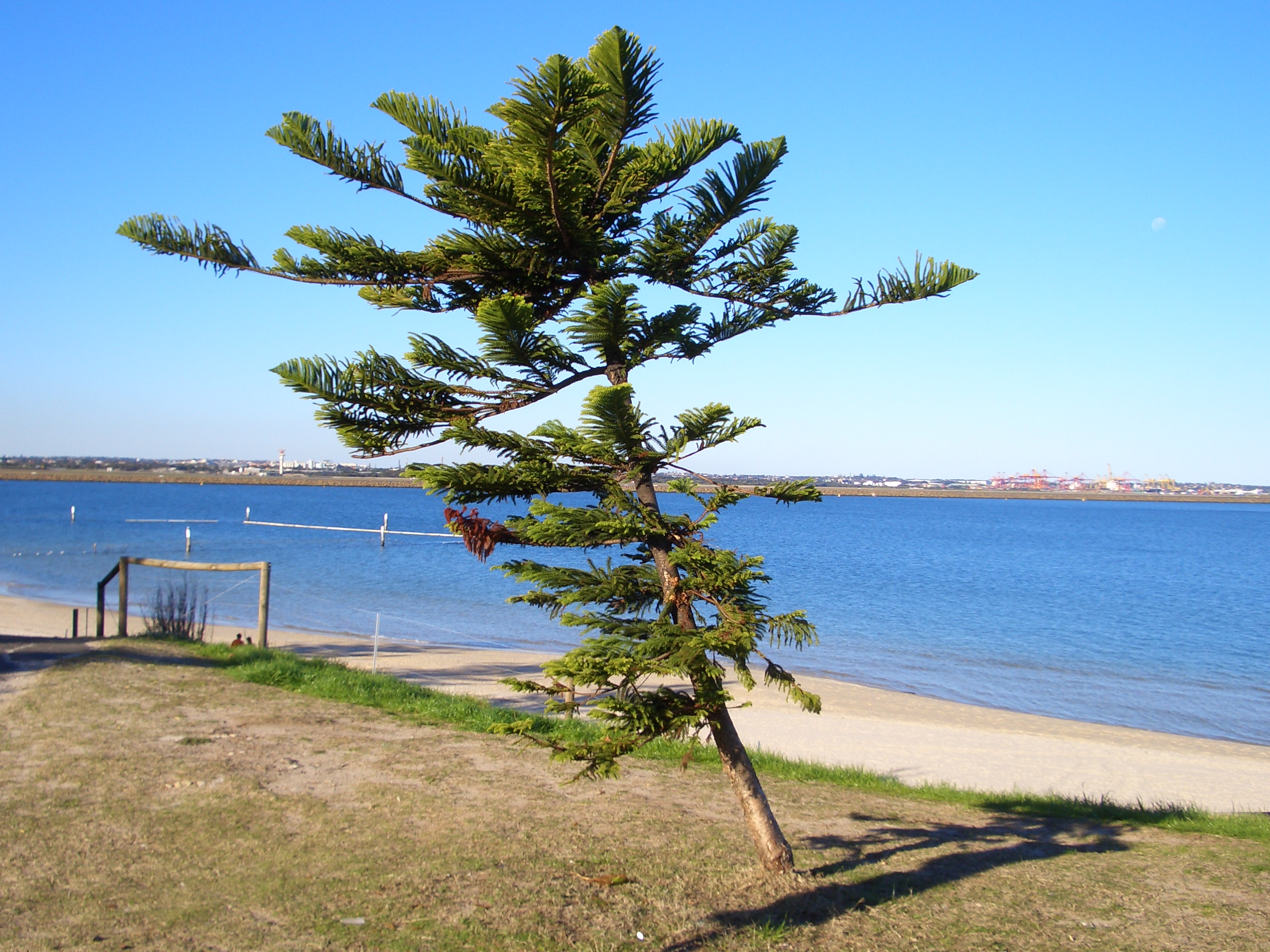
Lady Robinsons Beach, Kyeemagh

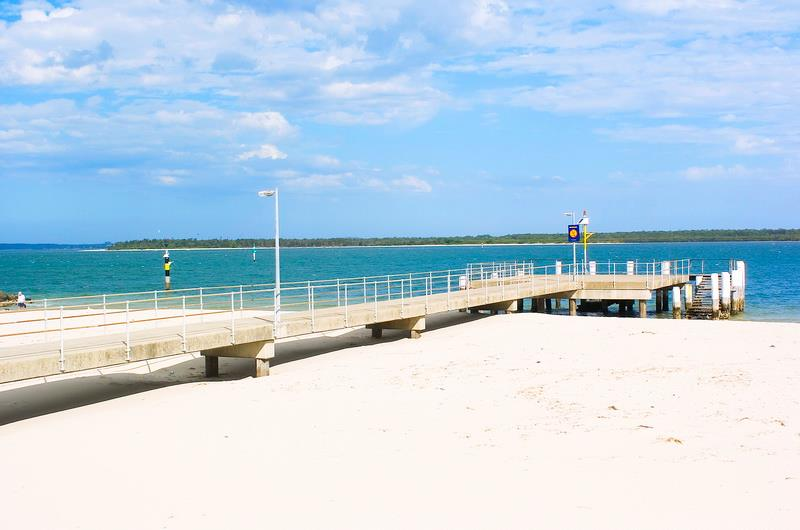
Brighton-Le-Sands wharf

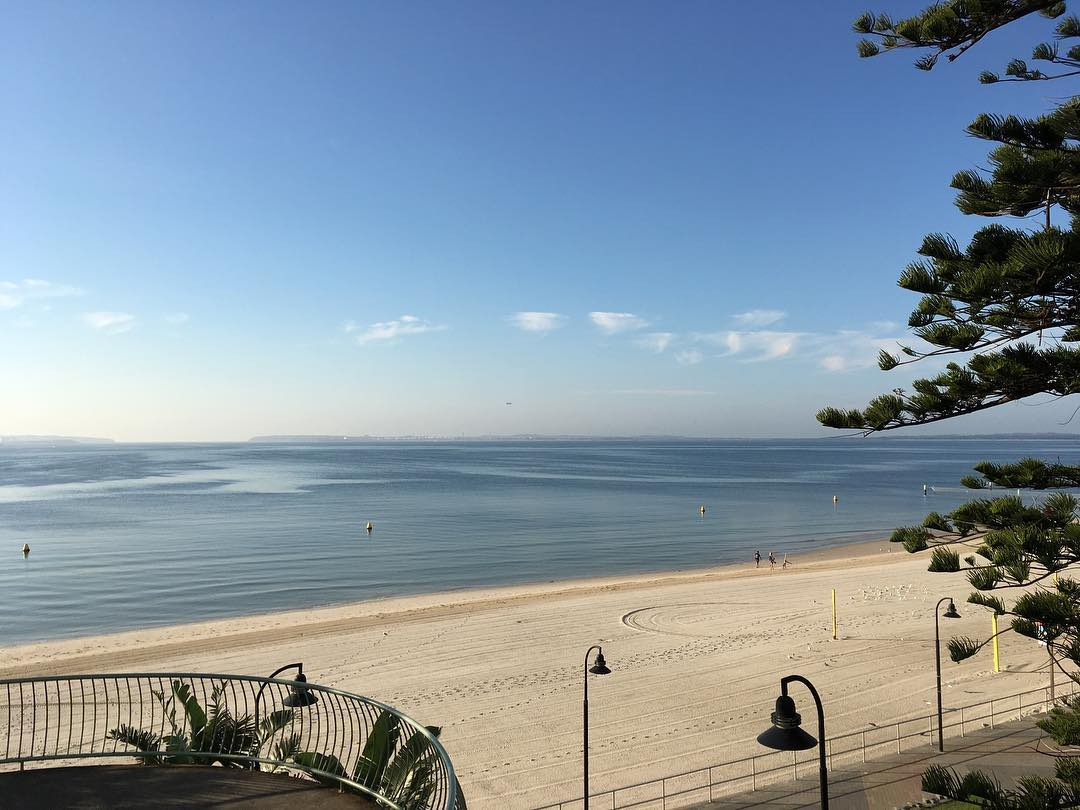
Beach view of Brighton-Le-Sands

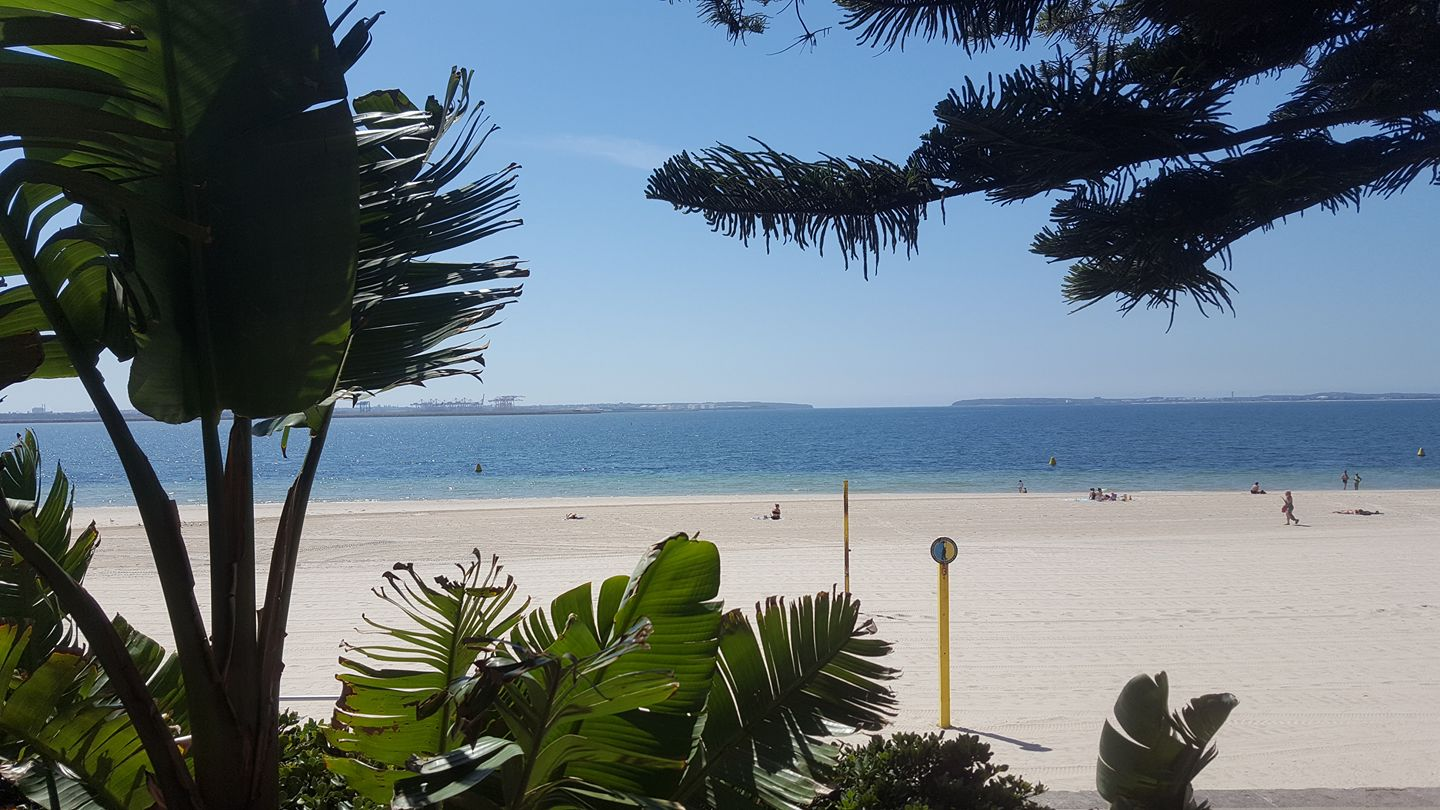
Closer view of Brighton-Le-Sands

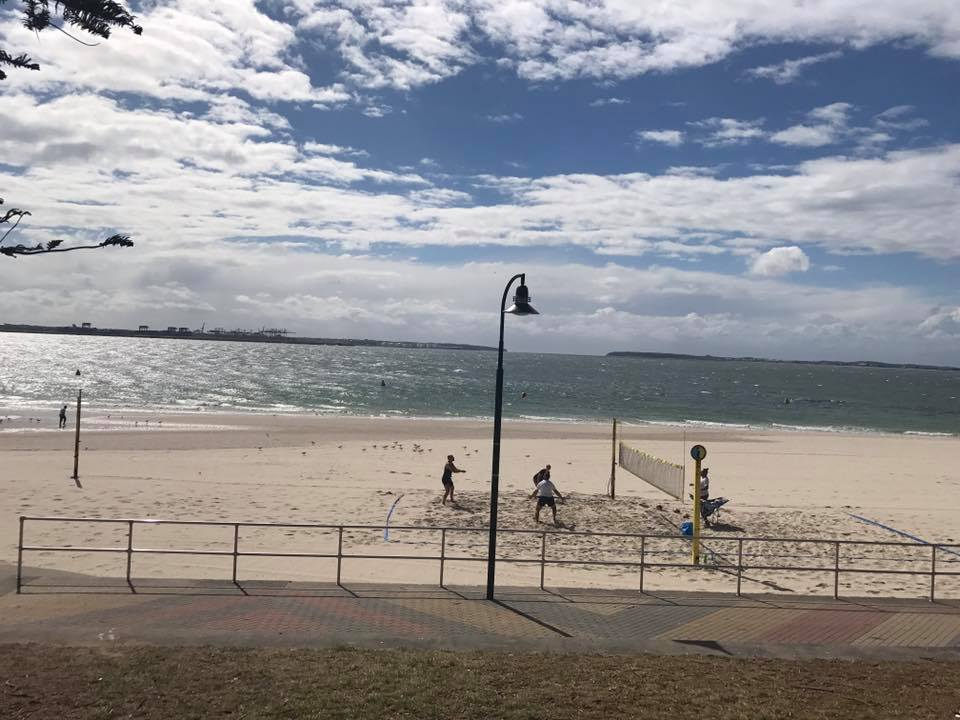
The beach during sunny breaks
