= Ramsgate Beach =

- Suburb
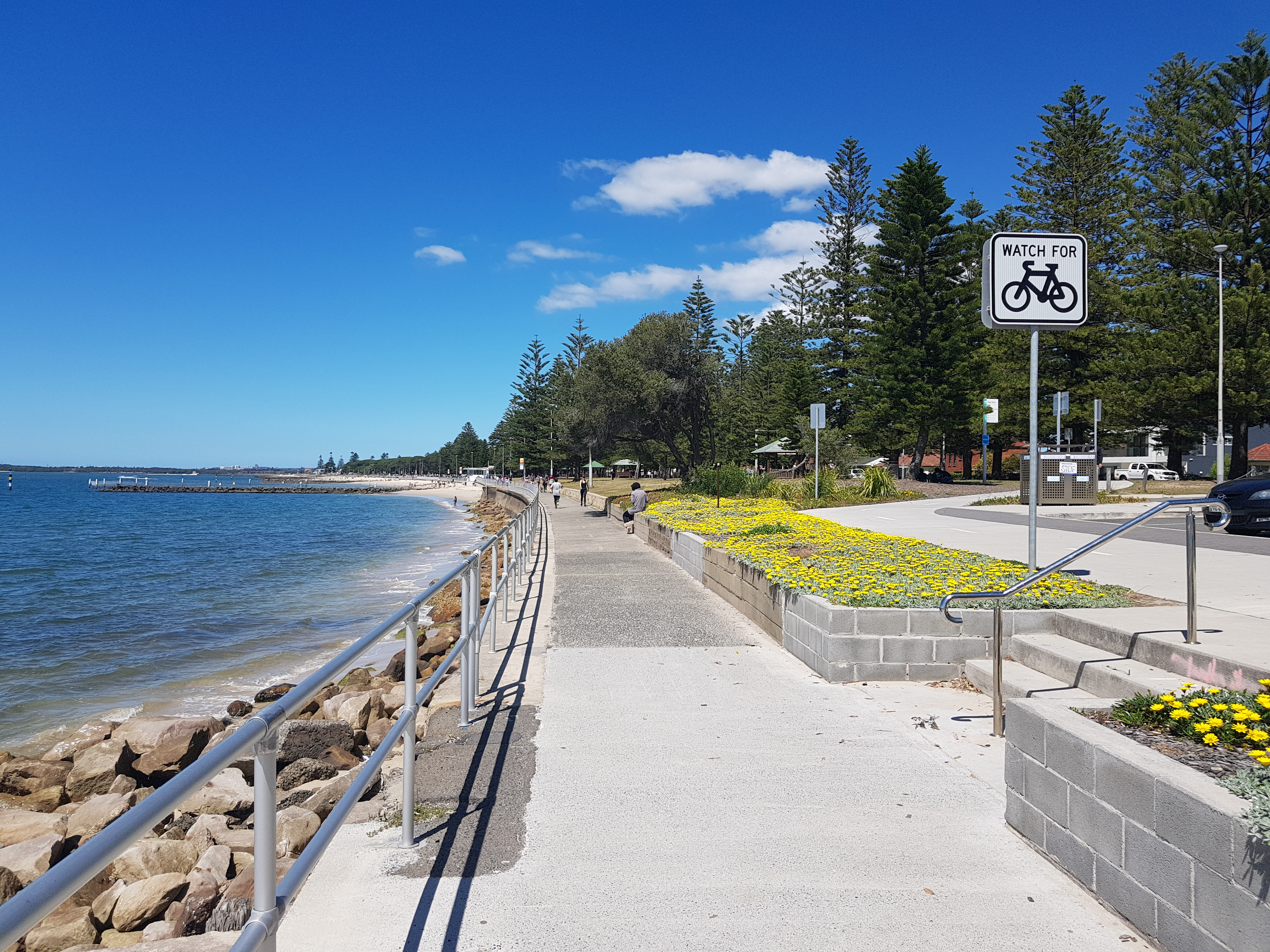
- Ramsgate Beach waterfront

- Interactive map of Ramsgate Beach
- Coordinates: 33°58′55″S 151°08′53″E
- Country: Australia
- State: New South Wales
- City: Sydney
- LGA: Bayside Council
- Location: 16 km (9.9 mi) south of Sydney CBD

Government
  - State electorate: Rockdale
  - Federal division: Kingsford Smith
- Elevation: 6 m (20 ft)

Population
  - Total: 1,734 (2021 census)
- Postcode: 2217
Suburbs around Ramsgate Beach
Kogarah	Monterey
Ramsgate	Ramsgate Beach	Botany Bay
Sans Souci	Sans Souci

Ramsgate Beach is a suburb in southern Sydney, in the state of New South Wales, Australia. Ramsgate Beach is located 16 kilometres south of the Sydney central business district, in the Bayside Council. It is a part of the St George area. The postcode is 2217. Ramsgate is a separate suburb, to the west.

== History ==
The area between the Cooks River and Georges River was originally known as Seven Mile Beach. It was changed to Lady Robinson's Beach in 1874 to honour Governor Sir Hercules Robinson's wife. Cook Park is named after Samuel Cook who advocated it as a public pleasure area. Ramsgate was named after the seaside resort in England. A model village was originally planned for the suburb but later abandoned.

== Geography ==
Ramsgate Beach is surrounded by the suburbs of Monterey, Ramsgate and Sans Souci. Lady Robinson Beach and Cook Park run along the eastern border of Ramsgate Beach, on Botany Bay. The suburb is mostly residential with a shopping strip including a supermarket on Ramsgate Road, near The Grand Parade. Another shopping strip, including the post office, is located in Ramsgate on Rocky Point Road, near the intersection of Ramsgate Road.

== Population ==
According to the 2021 census of Population, there were 1,734 people usually resident in Ramsgate Beach. 60.9% of people were born in Australia. 58.8% of people spoke only English at home. Other languages spoken at home included Greek at 10.9%. The most common responses for religious affiliation were Catholic 24.2%, No Religion 20.7%, Eastern Orthodox 20.0% and Anglican 10.1%.

== Landmarks ==
- Lady Robinsons Beach
- Cook Park
- Ramsgate Beach Baths
- Ramsgate Baptist Church
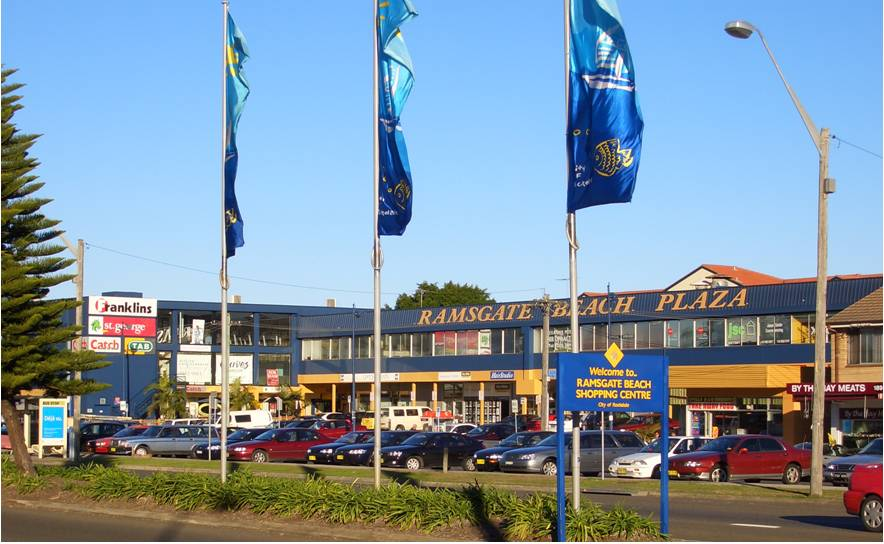
Ramsgate Beach Plaza, Ramsgate Road

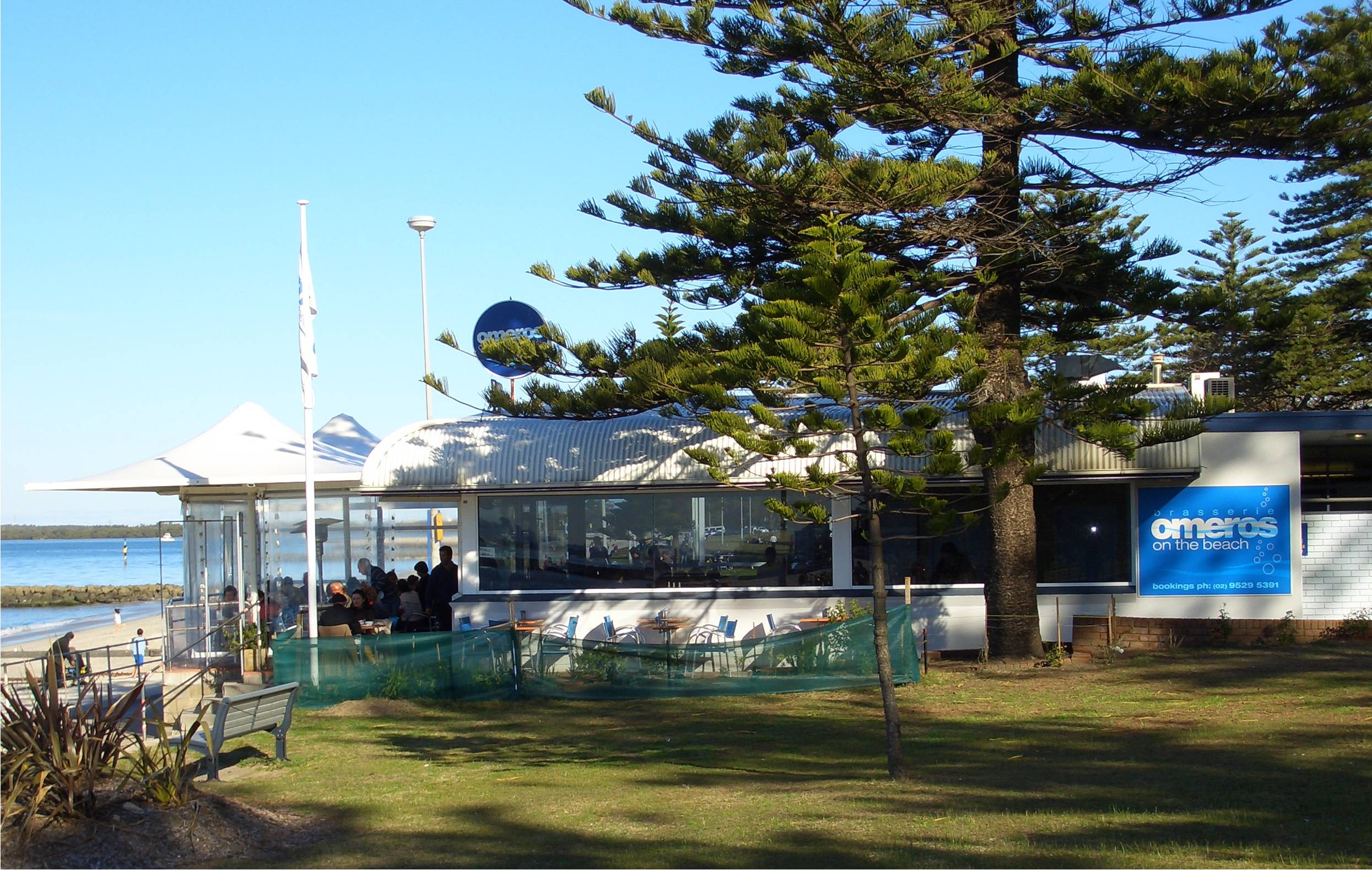
Restaurant, Cook Park

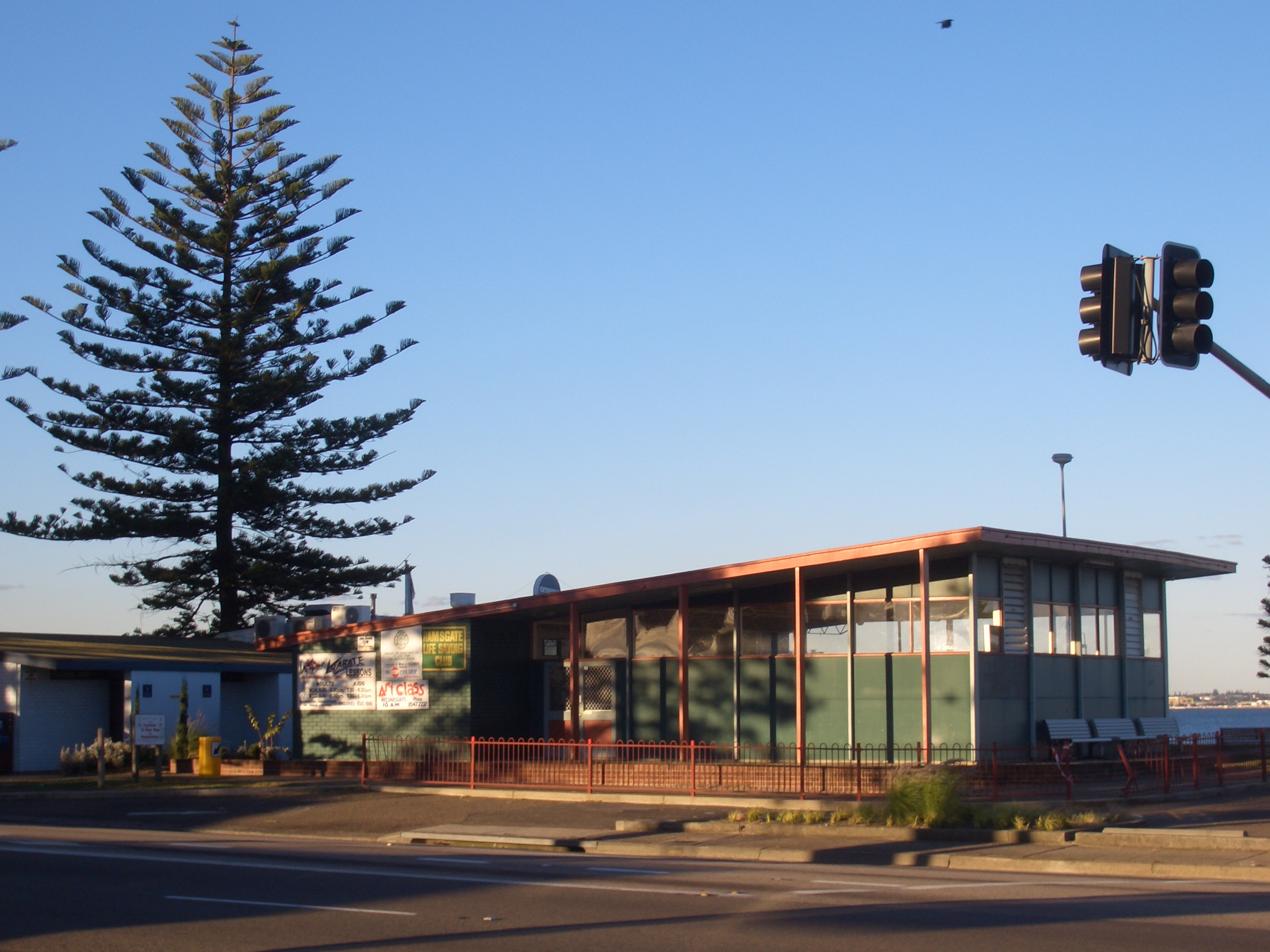
Life Saving Club, Cook Park

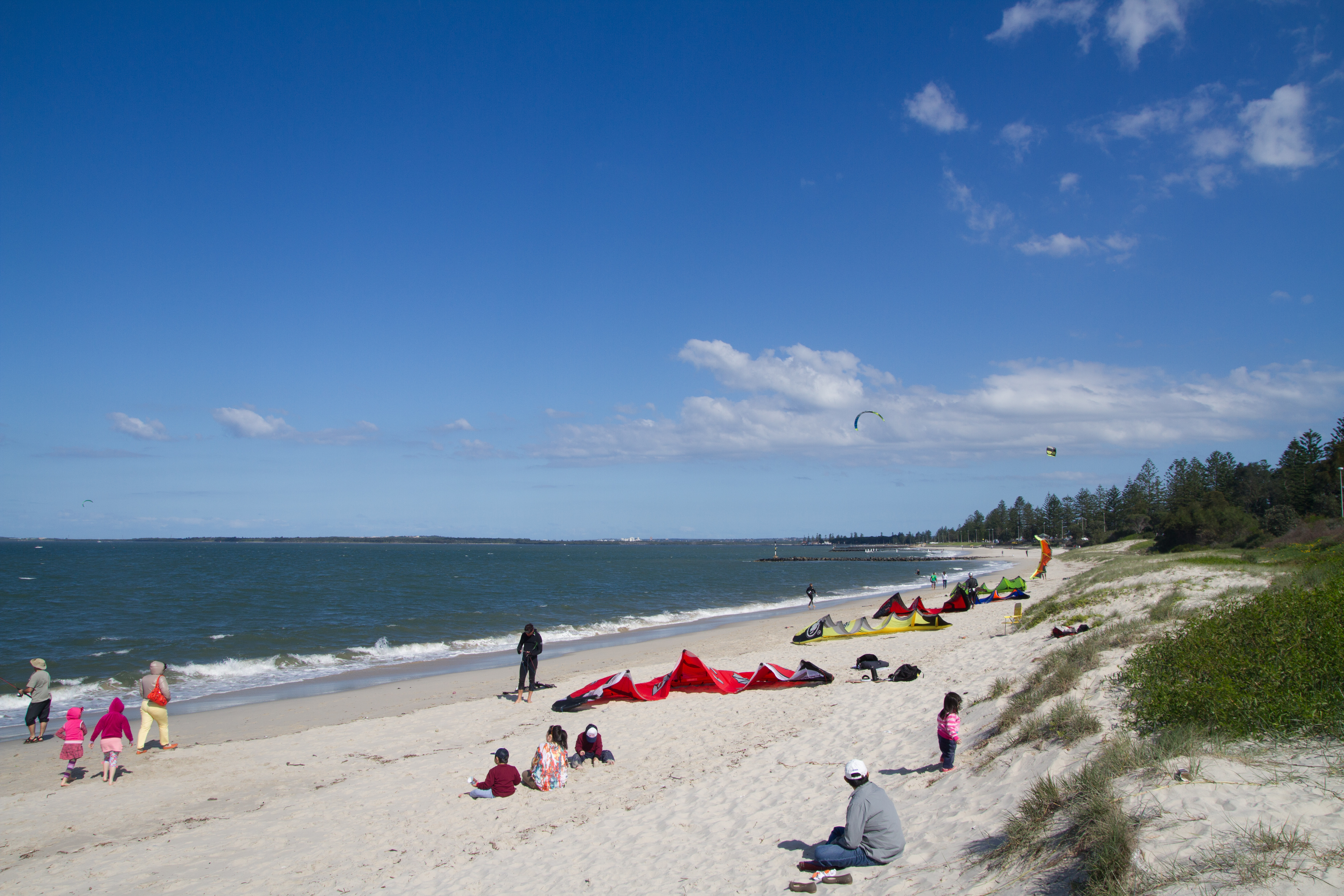
Lady Robinsons Beach
