= Monterey, New South Wales =

Monterey
- Suburb
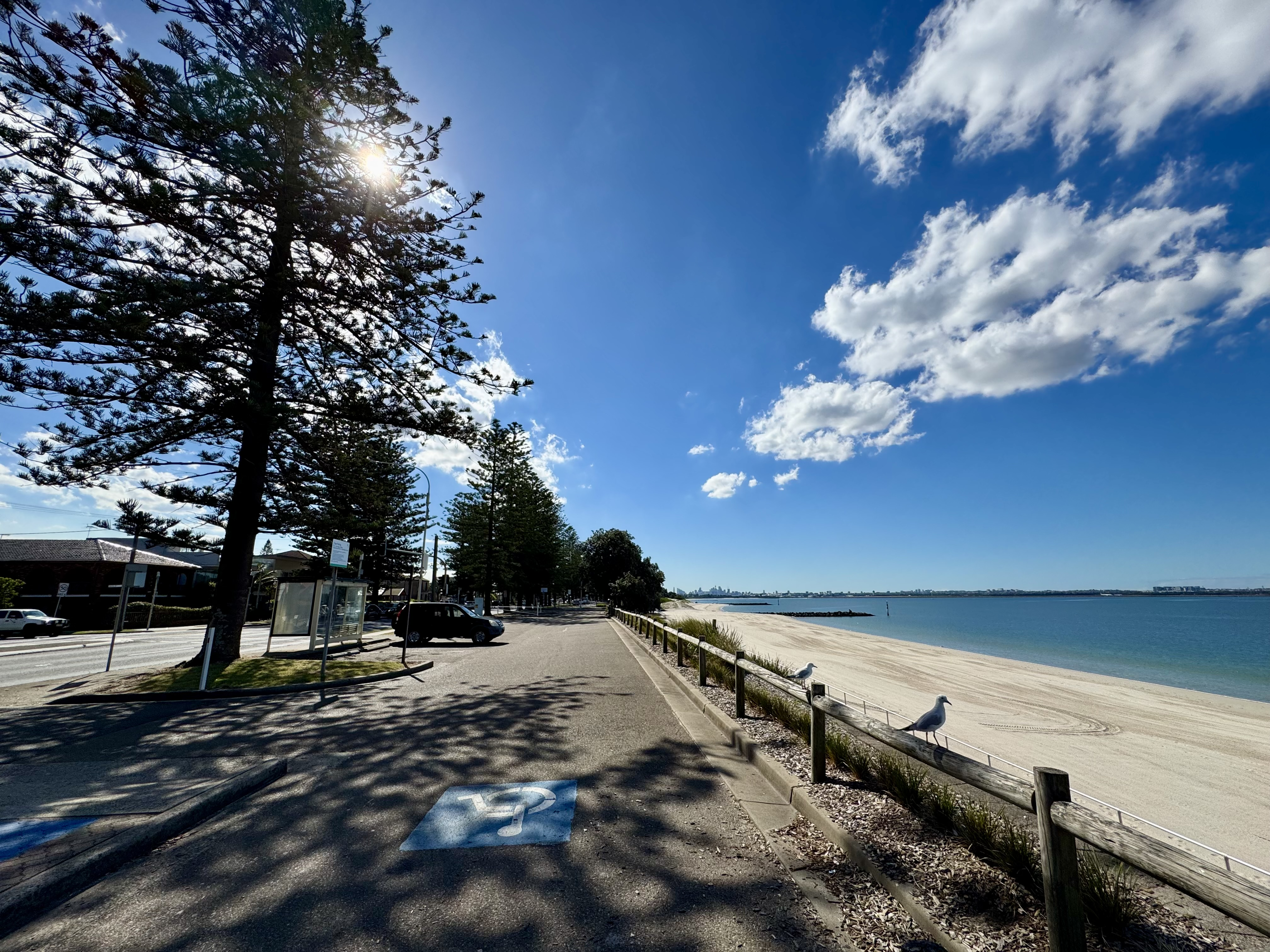
- Monterey Beach

- Interactive map of Monterey
- Coordinates: 33°58′26″S 151°08′52″E
- Country: Australia
- State: New South Wales
- City: Sydney
- LGA: Bayside Council
- Location: 15 km (9.3 mi) south of Sydney CBD
- Established: 1972

Government
  - State electorate: Rockdale
  - Federal division: Kingsford Smith
- Elevation: 17 m (56 ft)

Population
  - Total: 4,619 (2021 census)
- Postcode: 2217
Suburbs around Monterey
Rockdale	Brighton-Le-Sands
Kogarah	Monterey	Botany Bay
Ramsgate	Ramsgate Beach

Monterey (/ˌmɒntəˈreɪ/ MON-tə-RAY) is a suburb in southern Sydney, in the state of New South Wales, Australia 15 km south of the Sydney central business district and is part of the St George area. Monterey is in the local government area of the Bayside Council.

Monterey sits on the western shores of Botany Bay. Lady Robinsons Beach and Cook Park run along the eastern border. Scarborough Park, which features a pond, runs along the western border. The suburb is mostly residential with a small group of shops on Chuter Avenue, near the intersection of Scarborough Street.

The 1987 Music Video for Mental As Anything's single "He's just no good for you" was filmed in Scarborough Street, Monterey.

== History ==
Monterey was originally part of Brighton-Le-Sands and Ramsgate. As the area developed, street names with a Californian influence were selected such as Hollywood, Monterey, Pasadena and Culver. A small group of shops were built on Chuter Avenue, near Monterey Street. When the post office opened here it was known as the Monterey post office. Rockdale Council wanted to create a new suburb, although not everyone agreed with this name as some thought it was too American, especially with some of the street names already in the area. Since most people were in favour, Monterey was officially declared a suburb in 1972.

Scarborough Park was once part of Pat Moore's Swamp or Patmore Swamp. It was named by the Hon. Thomas Holt after the English coastal town of Scarborough, North Yorkshire.

== Demographics ==
According to the 2021 census of Population, there were 4,619 people usually resident in Monterey. 57.0% of people were born in Australia. The next most common countries of birth were Greece (5.9%) and Egypt (4.1%) as well as China (2.2%). 45.7% of people spoke only English at home. Other languages spoken at home included Greek (16.7%), Arabic (7.4%), Spanish (3.5%) and Macedonian (3.4%). The most common responses for religion were Eastern Orthodox (28.3%), Catholic (22.4%), No Religion (16.8%) and Islam (6.7%).

== Landmarks ==
- Scarborough Park, Tanner Reserve, Cook Park
- Lady Robinsons Beach
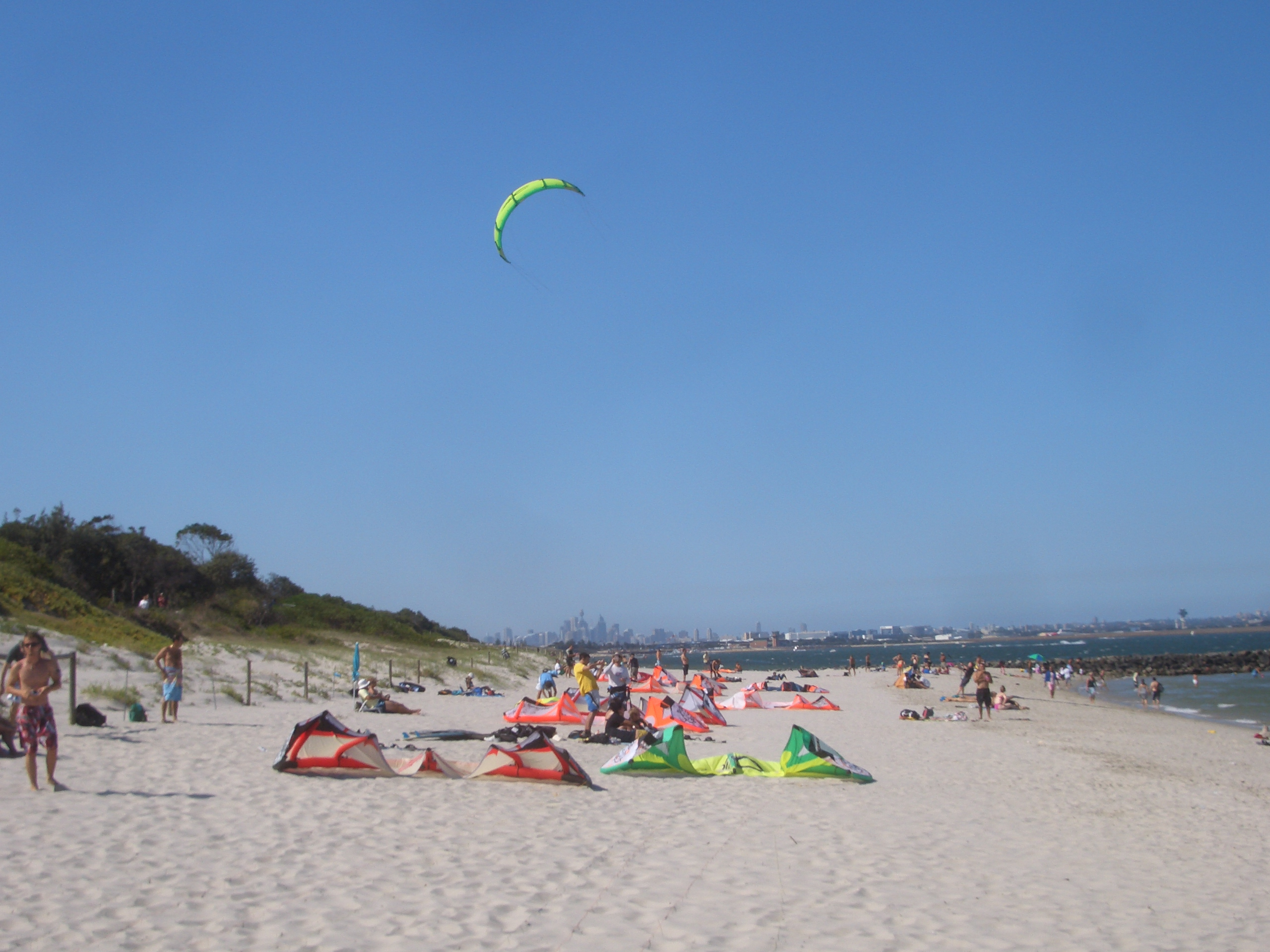
Kitesurfers on the beach

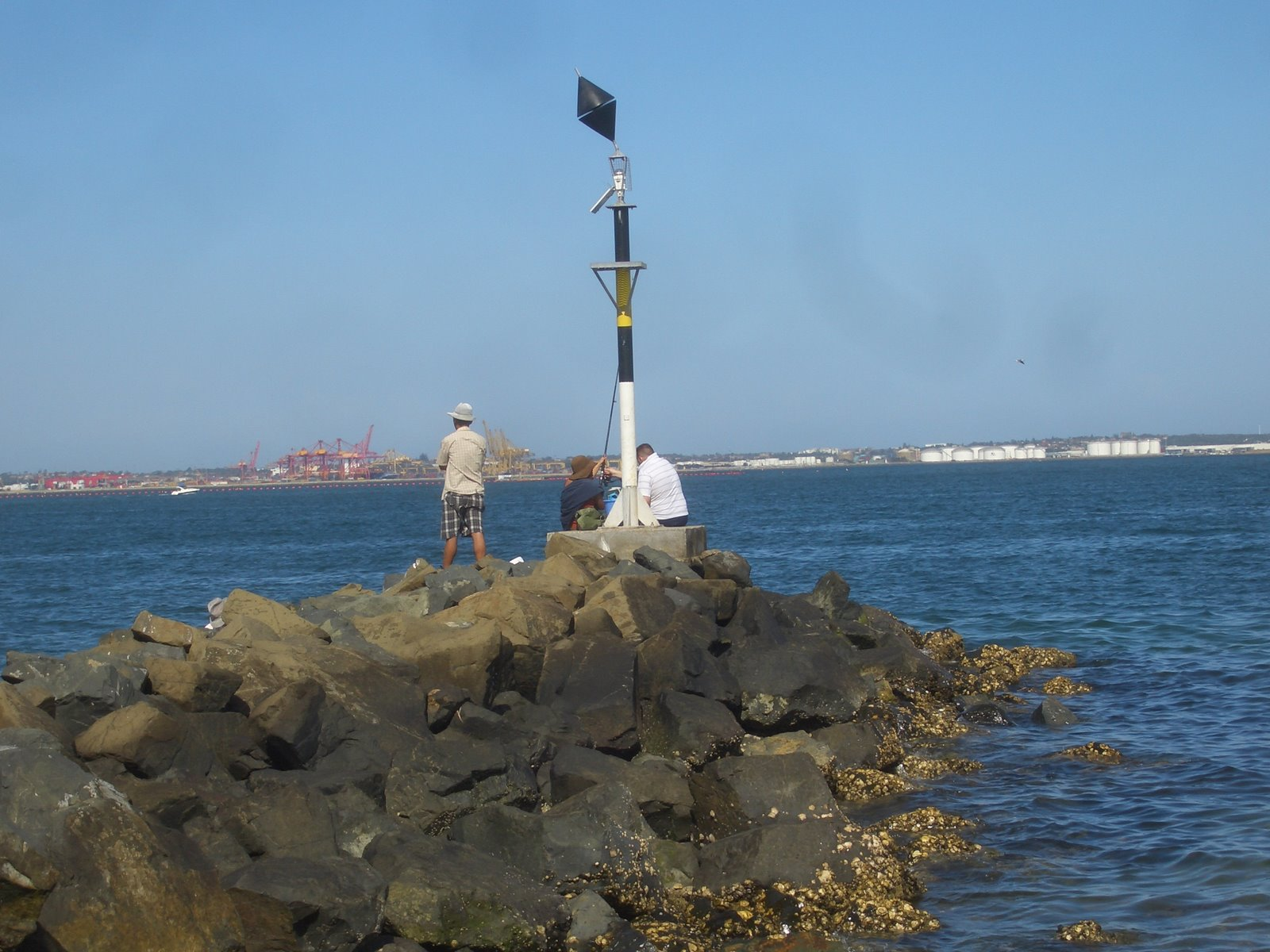
Rock wall on Botany Bay

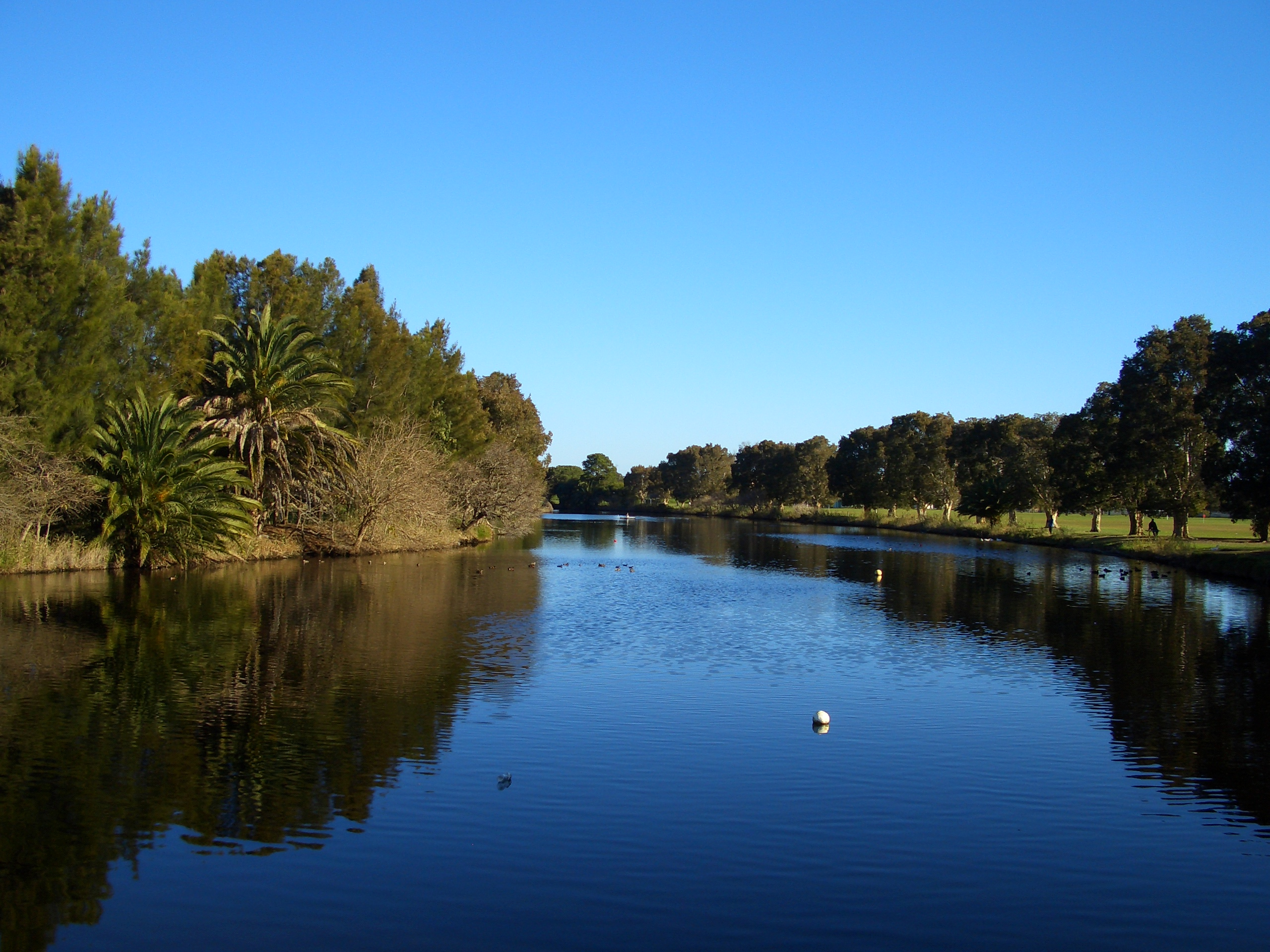
Scarborough Park

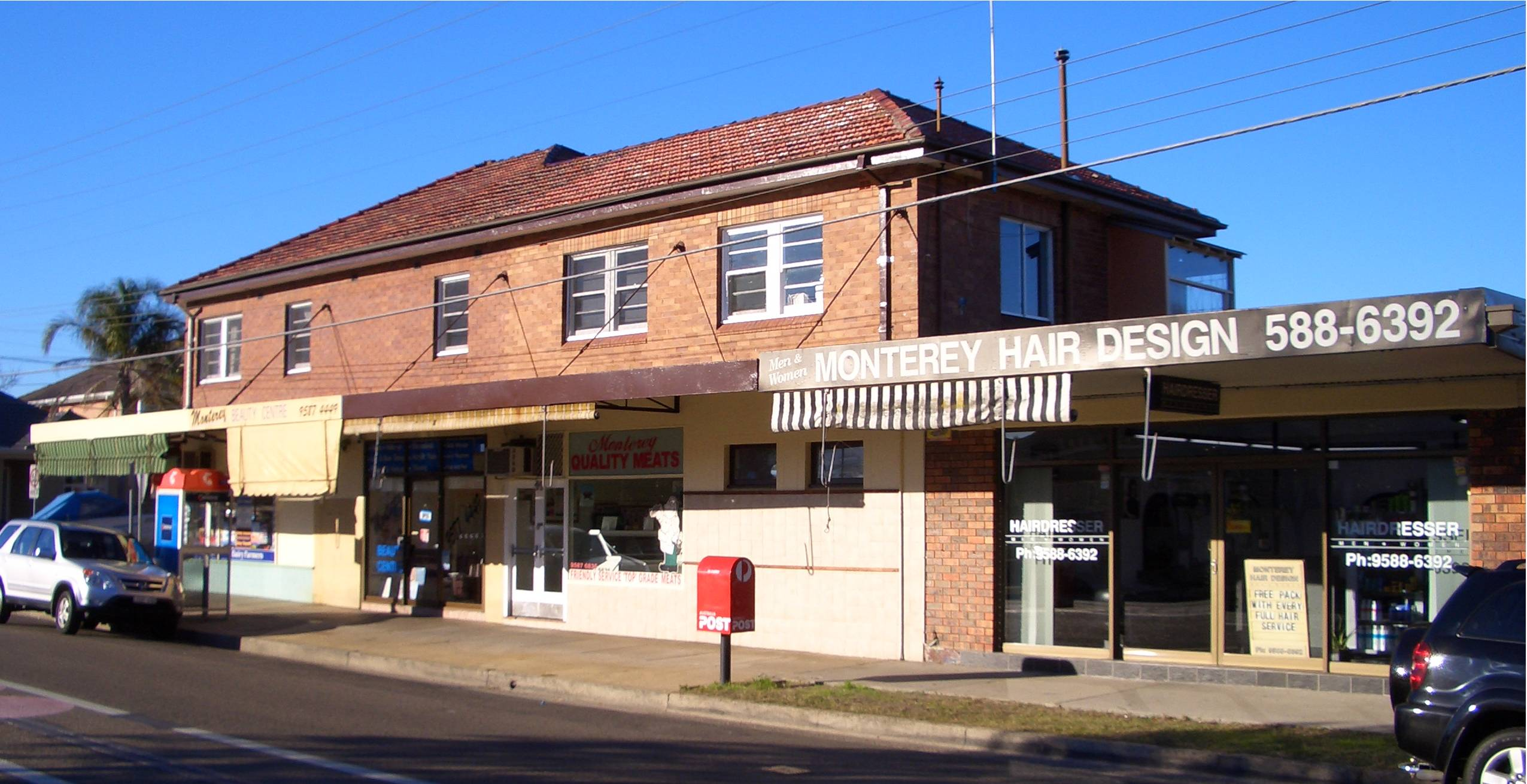
Chuter Avenue

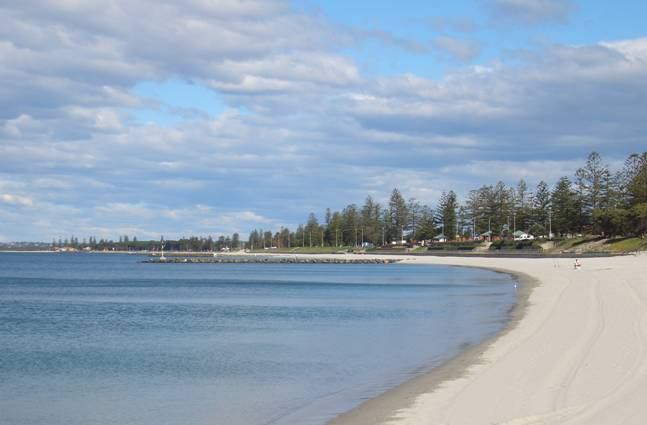
