= Ramsgate, New South Wales =

Ramsgate
- Suburb
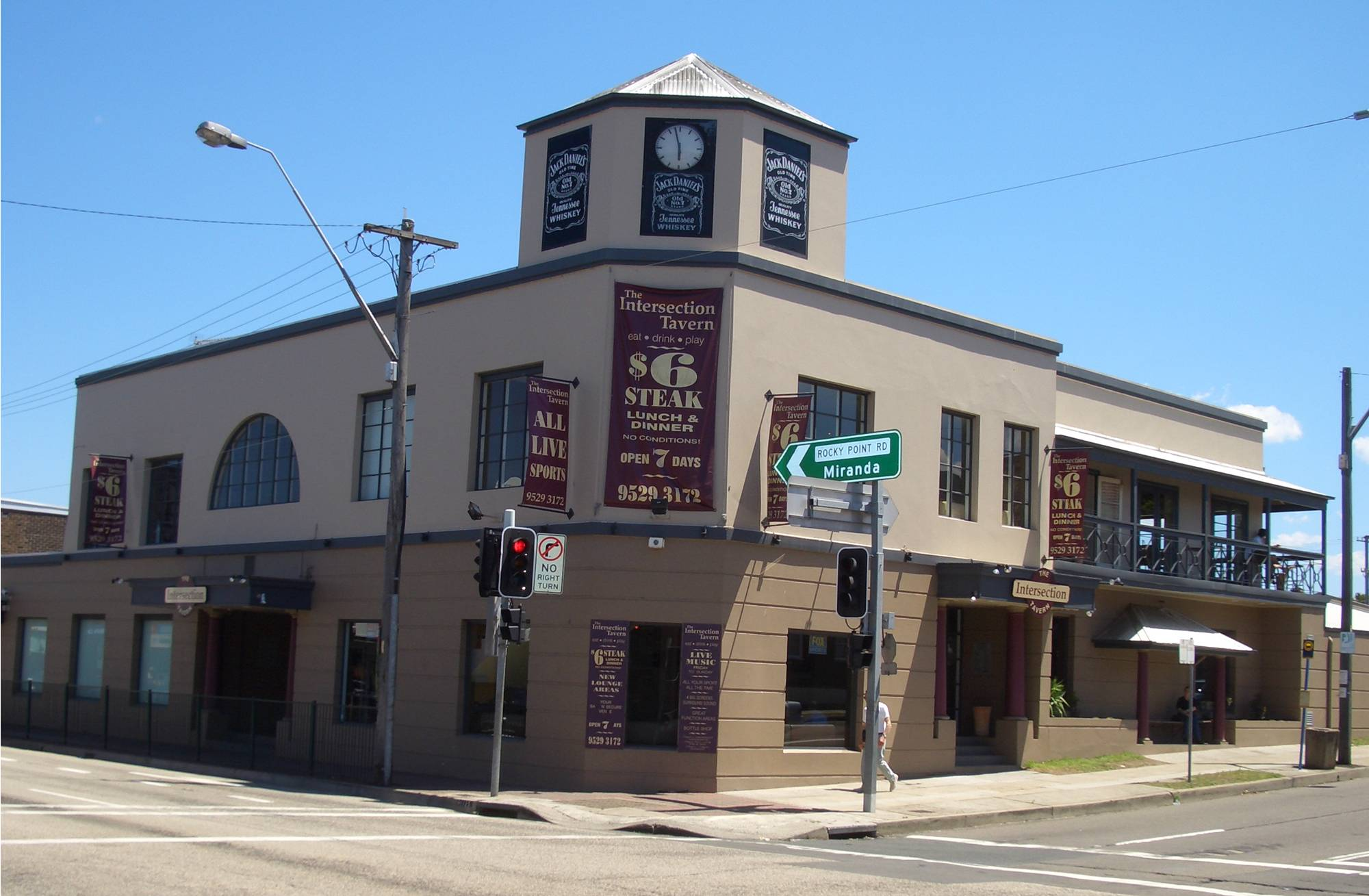
- Intersection Tavern, corner of Rocky Point Road and Ramsgate Road

- Interactive map of Ramsgate
- Coordinates: 33°58′55″S 151°08′24″E
- Country: Australia
- State: New South Wales
- City: Sydney
- LGAs: Bayside Council; Georges River Council
- Location: 16 km (9.9 mi) south of Sydney CBD

Government
  - State electorate: Rockdale
  - Federal divisions: Barton; Cook
- Elevation: 17 m (56 ft)

Population
  - Total: 1,151 (2021 census)
- Postcode: 2217
Suburbs around Ramsgate
| Kogarah | Kogarah | Monterey |
| Beverley Park | Ramsgate | Ramsgate Beach |
| Sans Souci | Sans Souci | Sans Souci |

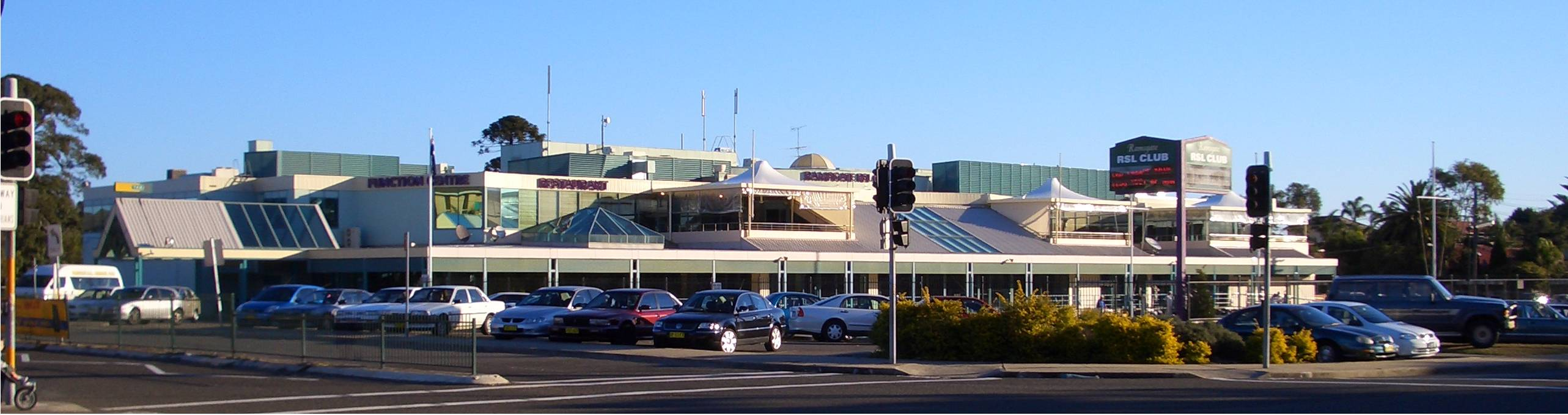
Ramsgate RSL

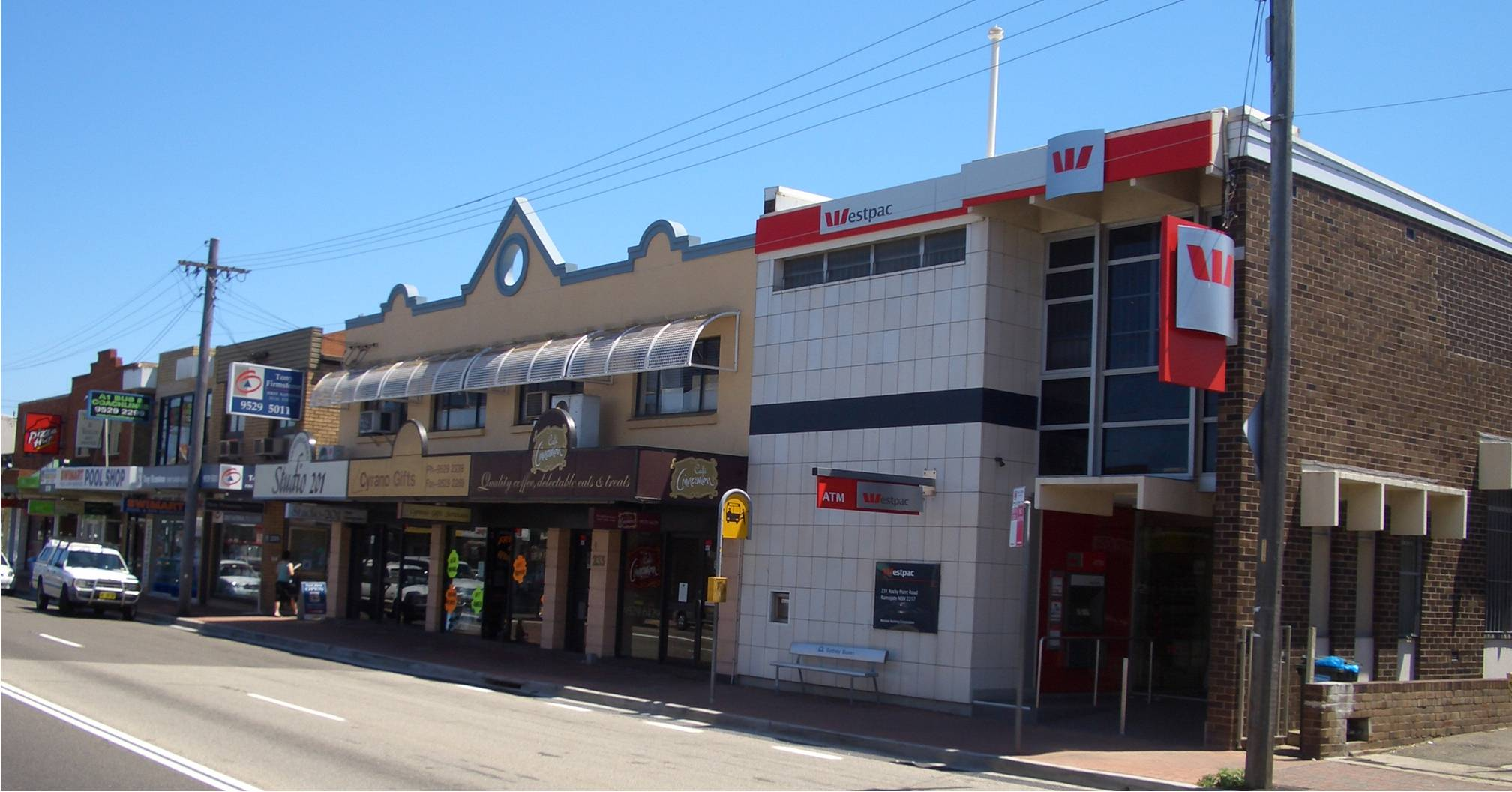
Rocky Point Road, Ramsgate

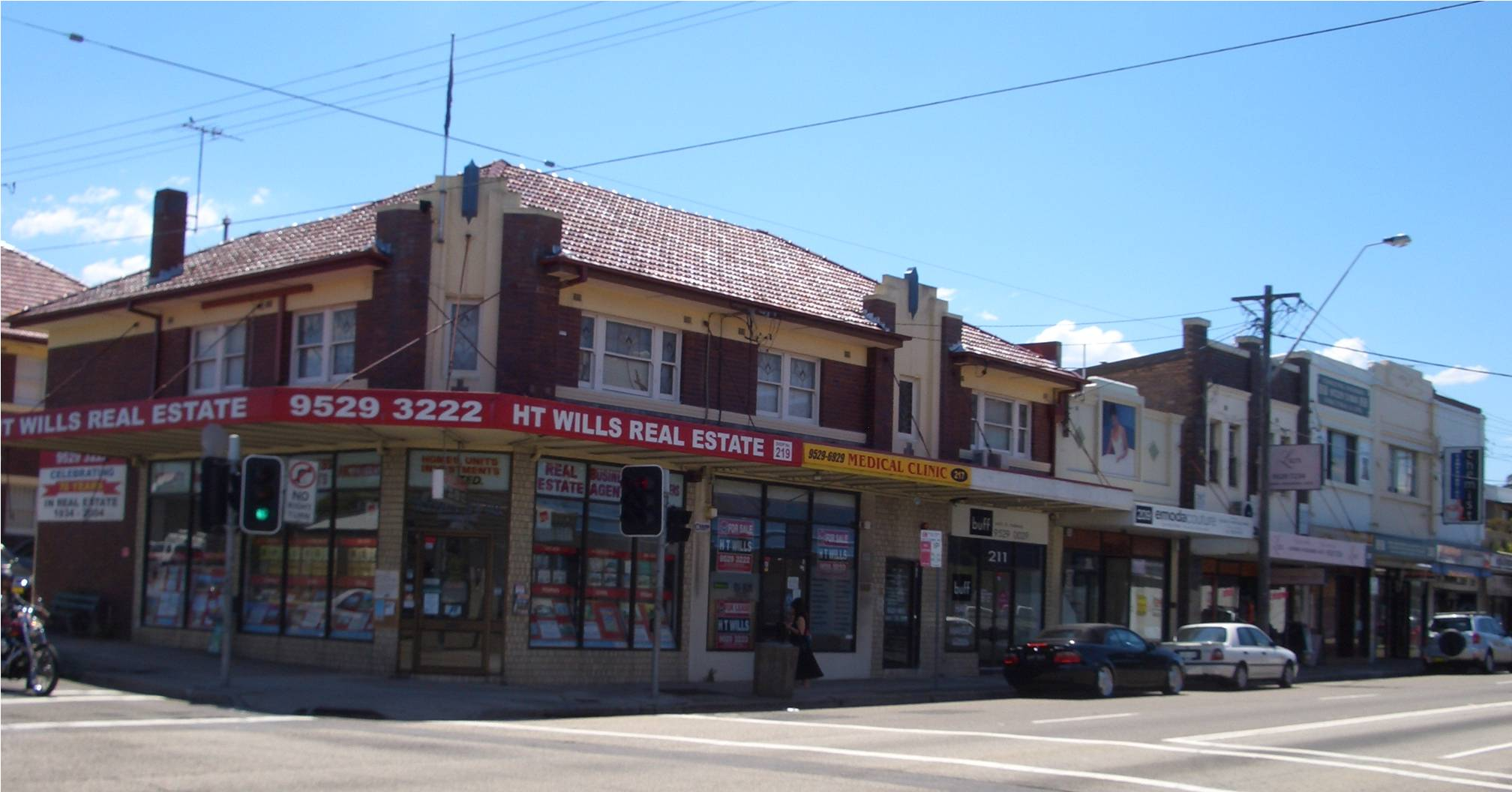
Rocky Point Road, Ramsgate

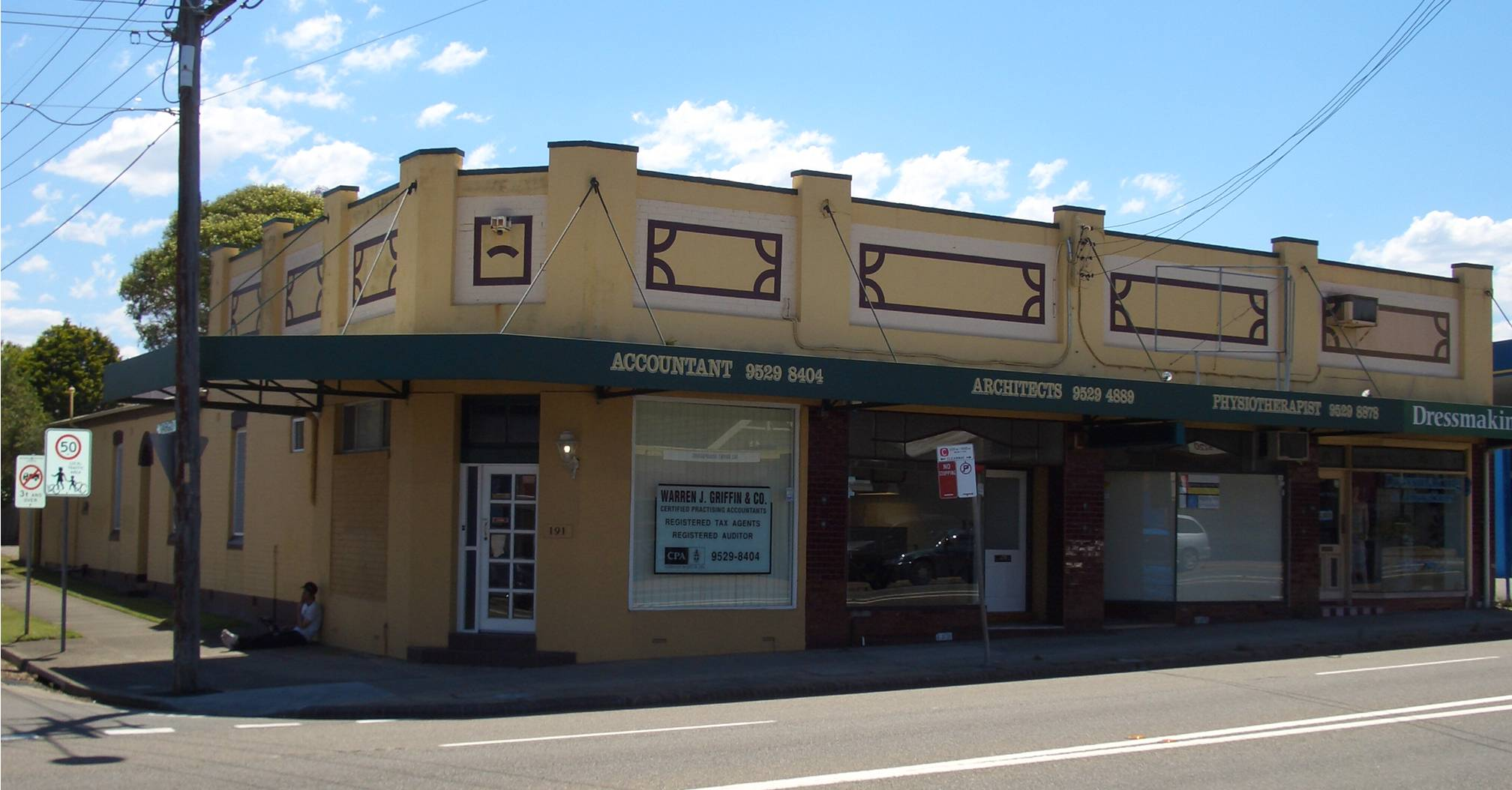
Rocky Point Road, Ramsgate

Ramsgate is a suburb in southern Sydney, in the state of New South Wales, Australia 16 km south of the Sydney central business district. It is part of the St George area. Divided by Rocky Point Road, part of Ramsgate to the east of Rocky Point Road is in the local government area of the Bayside Council, whilst properties to the west of Rocky Point Road are in the Georges River Council. Ramsgate Beach is a separate suburb, to the east.

Ramsgate is surrounded by the suburbs of Ramsgate Beach, Monterey, Kogarah, Beverley Park and Sans Souci.

== History ==
The area between Cooks River and Georges River was originally known as Seven Mile Beach. It was changed to Lady Robinson's Beach in 1874 to honour the wife of Governor Sir Hercules Robinson. Cook Park is named after Samuel Cook who advocated it as a public pleasure area. Ramsgate was named after the seaside resort in England. A model village was originally planned for the suburb but later abandoned.

Scarborough Park was created in the 1830s from part of Pat Moore's Swamp or Patmore Swamp. Patrick Moore was granted 60 acres (240,000 m^{2}) of land in 1812. It was named by the Hon. Thomas Holt after the English coastal town of Scarborough, Yorkshire and the First Fleet convict ship which was briefly anchored in Botany Bay in 1788.

== Commercial area ==
The suburb is mostly residential with a shopping strip on Rocky Point Road, near the intersection with Ramsgate Road. The strip includes the post office and a pub called The Intersection. Another shopping strip including a supermarket is located just over the border at Ramsgate Beach, on Ramsgate Road, near The Grand Parade. Ramsgate RSL Club is located on the border, near this shopping strip.

== Parks ==
- Scarborough Park, Leo Smith Reserve, Tonbridge St Reserve, Rotary Park.

== Landmarks ==
- Syd Frost Memorial Hall
- Ramsgate Primary School
- Ramsgate RSL

== Demographics ==
According to the 2021 Australian Census of Population, there were 1,151 people usually resident in Ramsgate. 61.8% stated they were born in Australia. The next most common countries of birth being Greece (4.1%), England (2.4%), China (2.2%), and Egypt (2.1%). English was stated as the only language spoken at home by 57.6% of residents and the most common other languages spoken were Greek (12.4%), Spanish (3.8%), Arabic (3.7%), and Mandarin (2.3%). The most common responses for religious affiliation were Catholic (22.6%), No Religion (21.7%), Orthodox (19.9%) and Anglican (10.3%).
