= Oyster farming on Georges River =

Aquaculture industry on Georges River, New South Wales, Australia

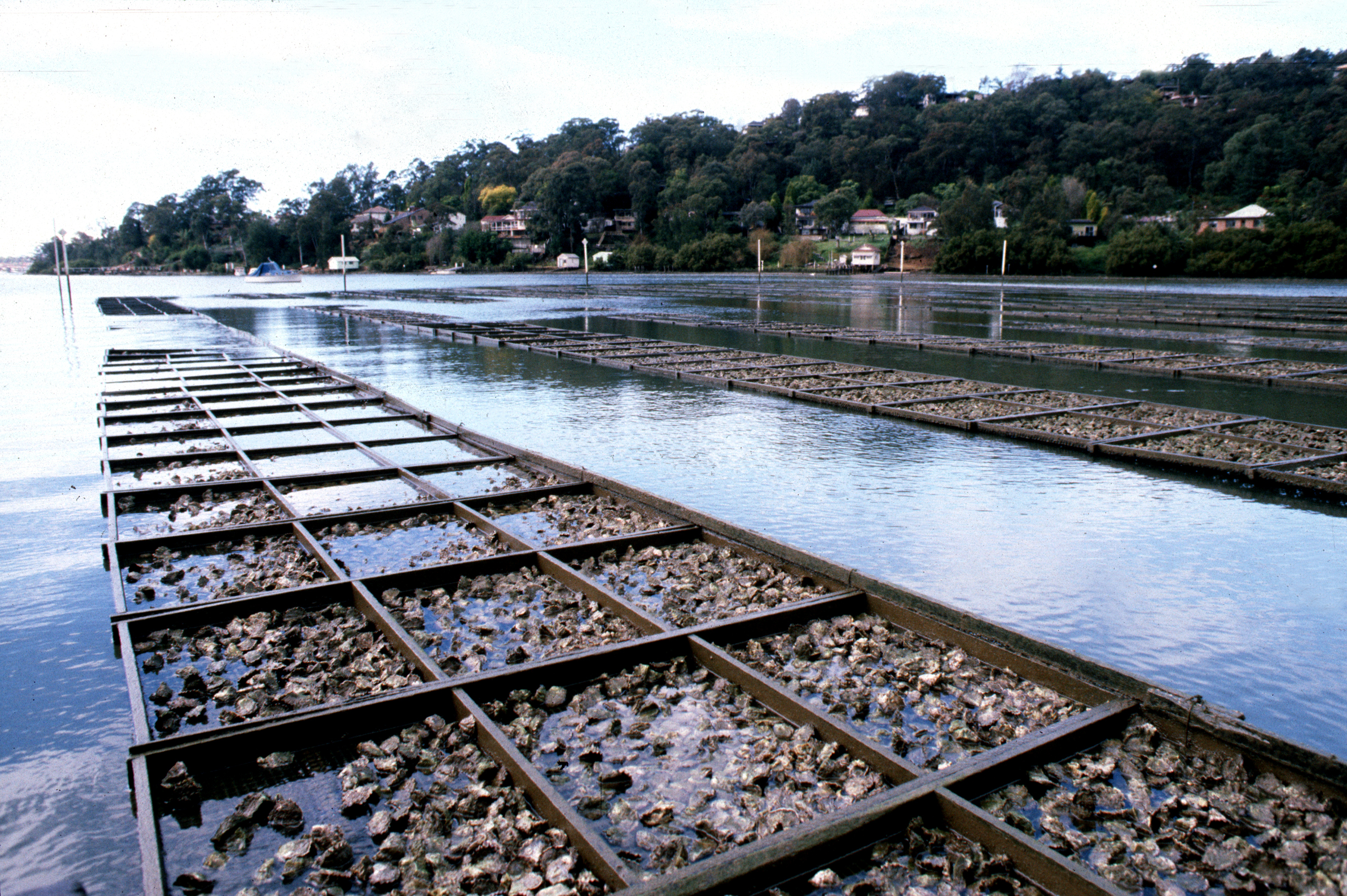
Oyster farm on Georges River (1989)

Oyster farming on Georges River, commercial aquaculture of Sydney Rock Oysters, in the Georges River estuary of New South Wales, Australia, occurred between around 1870 and 2023. Production peaked in the 1970s. In the financial year 1976–1977, the river produced 2,563 tonnes of oysters, over a quarter of the record statewide production total of 9,375 tonnes (the state total being equivalent to 204 million individual oysters). Following a series of setbacks after that year, an outbreak of QX disease in 1994, all but totally destroyed the industry on the Georges River; the development of QX-resistant strains came too late to save much of it. In 2023, the last oyster farm in the estuary was forced to close, and its future as an oyster growing area is now uncertain.

== Before commercial exploitation ==
Before the arrival of the first European colonists, Georges River was different in several ways to now. The land adjacent to its shores was not urbanised, nor had there been extensive land clearing within the river catchment. The river itself was less silted. Mangrove forests were not as extensive, and much of their ultimate area was salt marsh habitat, now vestigial and endangered in the estuary. There were also large, naturally occurring oyster reefs in the estuary and Botany Bay.

The extent of the natural oyster beds in New South Wales was mapped, as part of the work of a Royal Commission into the oyster industry in 1876, but these records were lost in the Garden Palace fire in 1882. It is known, however, that the natural beds in the Georges River estuary were once extensive; one natural bed, off Connells Point, was recorded as being a one-quarter mile (400 m) long by 150 yards (140 m) wide. The Royal Commission's report described the natural beds as, "close set clumps of five or six oysters and two or four clumps thick all over the bed, averaging about eighteen mature oysters beside spat on every 5 square inches over an unbroken bed of shell on a tolerably hard bottom".

The river was used as a food source by the Aboriginal people who lived along its shorelines. The harvesting of seafood from the estuary by the traditional owners had little if any impact on the otherwise pristine state of the estuary environment.

Oysters thrive in the waters downstream of Salt Pan Creek. In this part of the river, the right bank of the river (southern side) is a part of the traditional land of the Gweagal clan of Dharawal people. Opposite, on the left bank (northern side), are traditional lands belonging to either Dharug people or coastal Eora people, both of whom spoke a common language. Georges River Council acknowledges that the Biddegal/Bidjigal/Bedegal clan of the Eora are the original inhabitants and custodians of land and water in the Georges River LGA.

For people living by the estuary, oysters were an important food. Over thousands of years, large middens consisting largely of oyster shells accumulated near the river. The contents of the Aboriginal middens reveal the species of oysters that were present before colonisation. The middens contain a mixture of the Native oyster (Ostrea angasi), also known as the flat or mud oyster, and the Sydney Rock Oyster (Saccostrea glomerata). The Native oyster became locally extinct in the Georges River, in 1896.

The Aboriginal presence continued for many years after colonisation. An early oyster farmer recalled that there was a lone Aboriginal man living traditionally, in a rock shelter at Audrey Bay, Illawong, as late as the 1880s. There was also an unofficial Aboriginal settlement at Salt Pan Creek, until the early 1940s.

== Early commercial activities ==
=== Lime burning ===
The predominant bedrock of the Sydney region is Hawkesbury Sandstone and, in some areas, Wianamatta shale. The sandstone was useful as a source of stone blocks for building and the shale for making bricks. However, there was no limestone, conveniently near to Sydney, which could be burnt to create lime, used to make lime mortar for masonry building work. Lime was also needed to treat acid soils for agriculture.

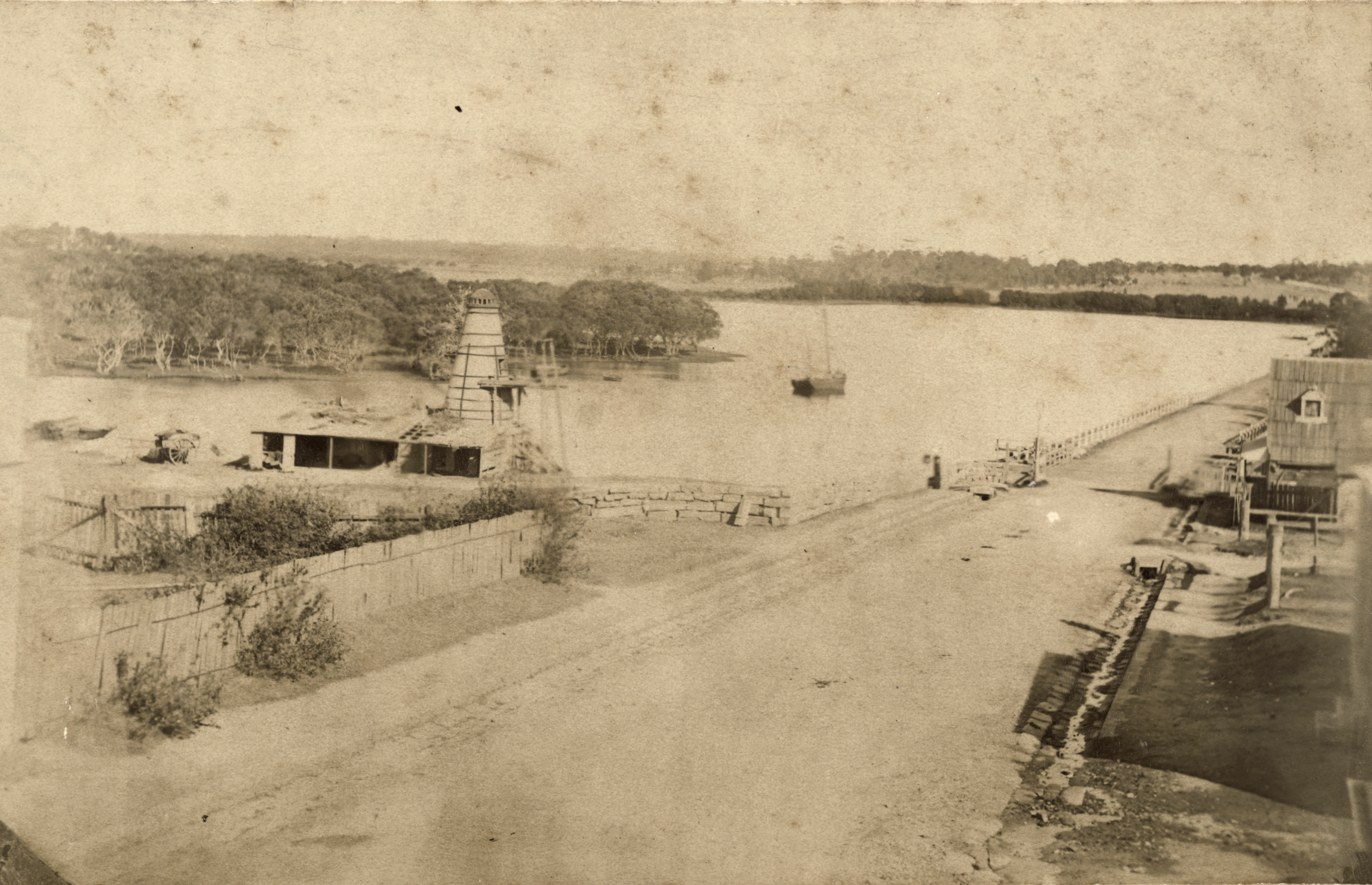
Lime kiln on Cooks River (1870s)

In the early decades of the colony of New South Wales, oyster shells were burnt to create lime. Because the Georges River was naturally endowed with oysters, some early colonists in the area were lime burners. One was John Alford, after whom Alfords Point is named, who supplied lime from the Georges River for the construction of the Landsdowne Bridge. The practice of lime burning gave rise to the name of Lime Kiln Bay, where there were lime kilns near the shore, in what is now Oatley Park. There were also lime kilns, on Cooks River, which used shells from Botany Bay and Georges River.

Because of its large and heavy shell the Native, flat, or mud oyster was preferred for lime production. Colonists had a preference for the taste of the 'cluster' or rock oyster, which also had better keeping characteristics. The sub-tidal oyster beds in the river contained mature oysters of both species.

Demand for lime outstripped what could be obtained from dead shells, and live oysters were dredged from the estuary, and burnt to make lime. In 1868, after sources of limestone had been found outside Sydney, and the oyster beds were becoming depleted, the colonial government banned the practice of dredging live oysters for lime. Lime burning continued, resulting in the destruction of some Aboriginal middens.

=== An early attempt at oyster farming ===
A colonial politician and landholder, Thomas Holt, had made a tour of the French oyster farming industry around 1863. After returning to Australia, he bought land on the estuary foreshore, in 1864. On that land, he attempted to emulate the French technique of oyster farming using claires, which are long rectangular ponds excavated into former salt marshes. The water in the claires was refreshed using tidal flows, but is also augmented by rain, keeping it slightly less saline than seawater and so more suitable for fattening oysters. Holt was intending to farm the Sydney Rock Oyster, but the method he used was possibly more appropriate to a sub-tidal species such as the Native flat or mud oyster (Ostrea angasi); although a different species, Ostrea angasi has a superficial resemblance to the European flat oyster (Ostrea edulis), which when finished in claires becomes the renowned Belon oyster.

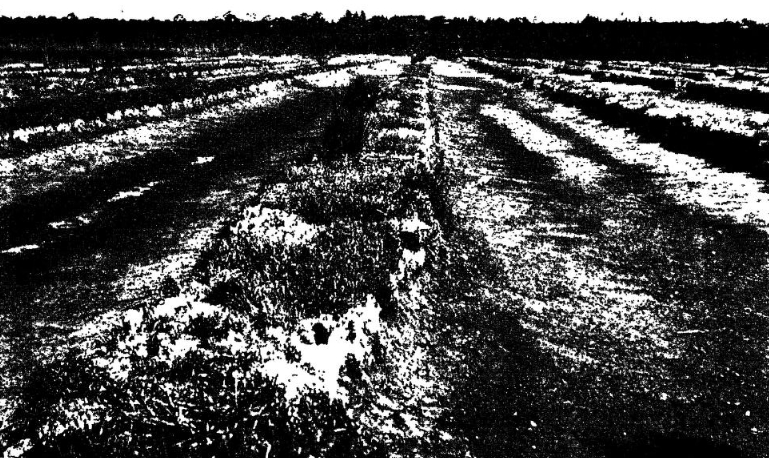
Remnants of 'claires' or 'channels' at Gwawley Bay, photographed in April or May 1921, by T.C. Roughley.

Around 1870, Gwawley Bay, since redeveloped as the canal estate, Sylvania Waters, was the site of Holt's oyster farming project. Its shore was also the site of Holt's house, Sutherland House. He had a bridge built across the opening of the bay, into which were incorporated flood gates to control the tidal flow, and had claires dug into low-lying land bordering the eastern side of the bay. The land alongside the claires, which had been raised using spoil dug from the claires, was used for grazing cattle and alpacas. Holt's claires were 22 feet wide (another report stated from 14 to 33 feet wide) and totalled 30 miles in length, with water depth at low tide varying between four inches and two feet. Holt had earlier enclosed nearby Weeney Bay, using piles, and oyster spat was gathered there. Oysters were lost due to the climatic temperature and turbidity of the water in the claires. With hindsight, it was also much more labour-intensive than necessary, under the conditions prevailing on the Georges River. Production actually increased once the flood gates at Gwawley Bay were removed, and some large and good quality oysters were grown. However, the venture was uneconomic, and it ended after a few years. Holt was reported to have spent £10,000 on the venture, a large sum for the time.

Holt's venture was an early attempt at sustainable oyster aquaculture in the estuary, and his oyster beds in the bay were still producing oysters as late as 1888. However, the French technique of oyster growing would never be reattempted in Australia. The claires, locally called 'channels', were still there in the early 1920s, and still discernible in a 1953 aerial photograph of the area. Both Gwawley Bay and Weeney Bay would later be and long remain the sites of commercial oyster farms, using other methods.

A lasting legacy of Holt's time was that Gwawley and Weeney Bays were, uniquely in New South Wales, privately owned waterways. Much later, in 1963, that privately owned status would lead to the end of oyster farming at Gwawley Bay.

=== Dredge harvesting and diving ===
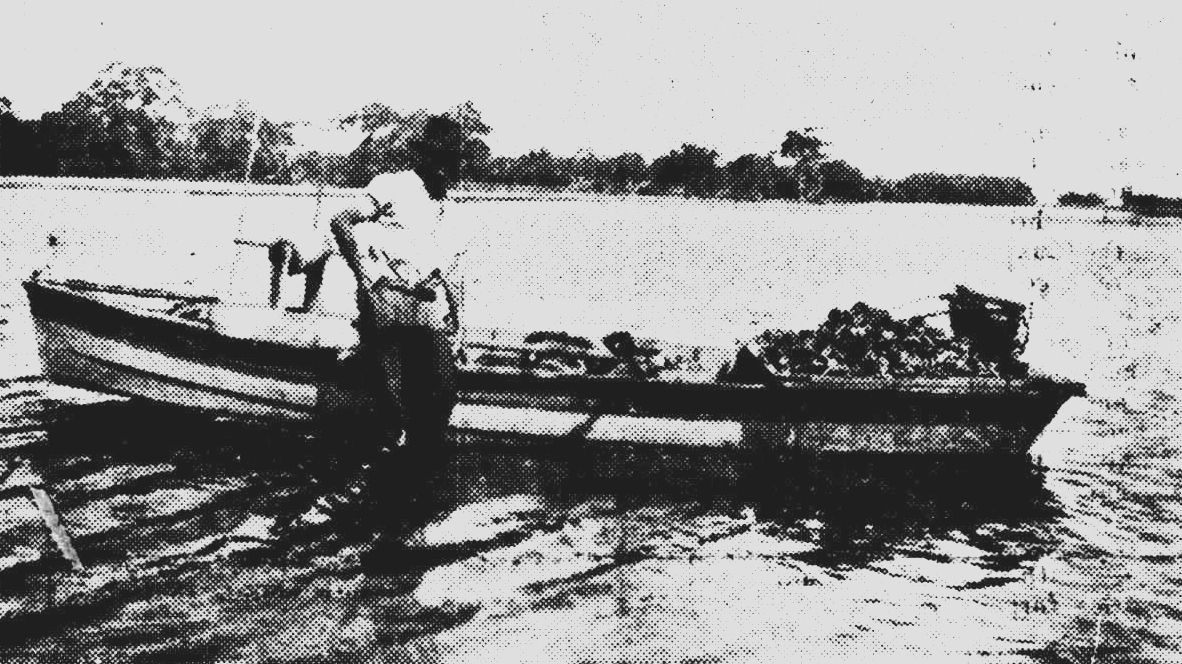
A rare photograph of an oyster dredging boat, taken in 1926 at Ballina, NSW. The dredge is at the stern, to the right of the pile of oysters and the windlass is forward to the man's left.

The focus shifted, from lime production, to dredge harvesting of oysters as a food, taken from the remaining naturally occurring oyster beds. In the 1870s, the natural oyster beds in the estuary were leased to two brothers named Emerson, one of whom, Alfred Emerson, was the proprietor of the Sea Breeze Hotel, at Tom Uglys Point, now the most southerly part of Blakehurst. He established his depot on O'Connells Bay, now known as Connells Bay.

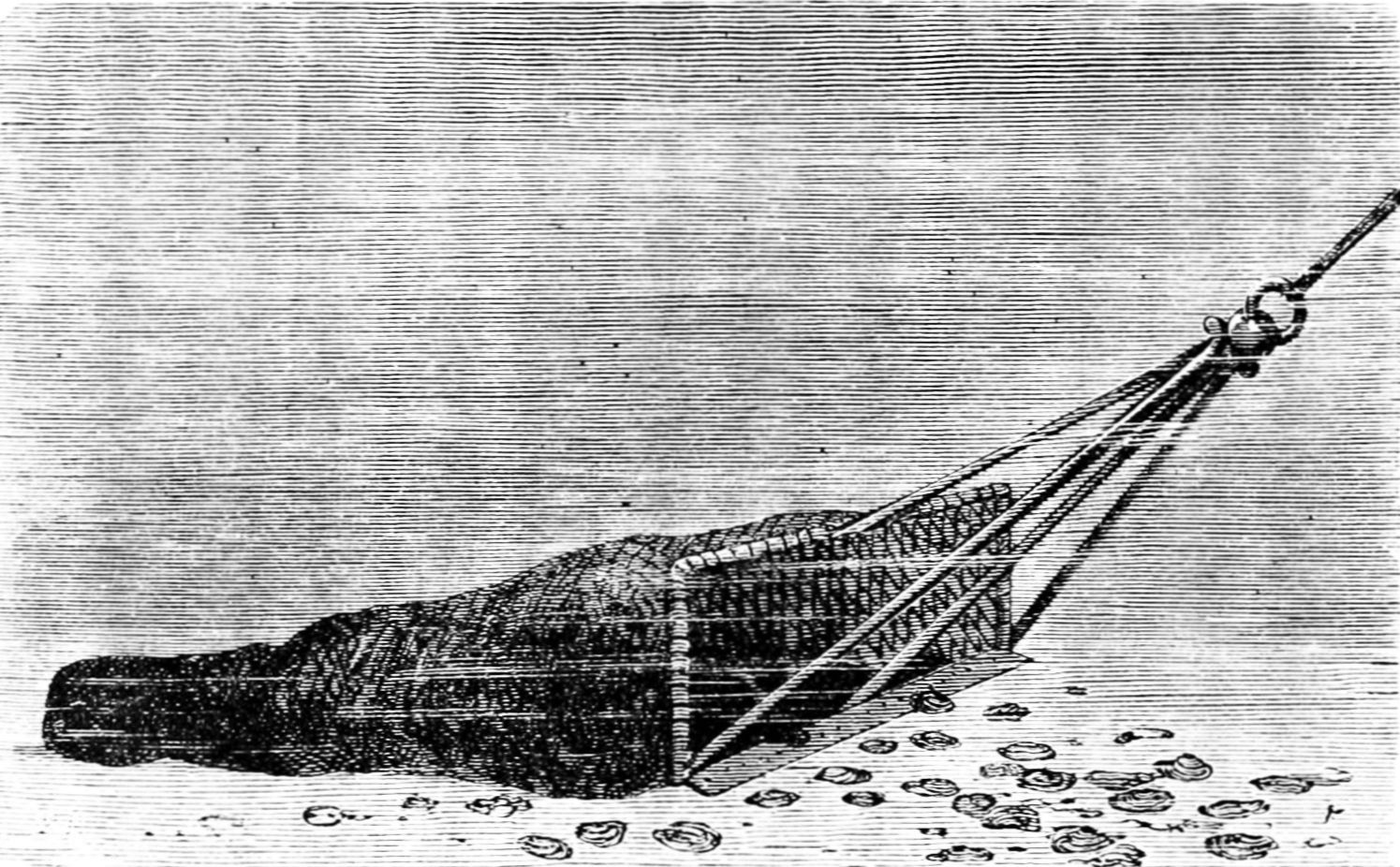
An American oyster dredge, c.1875, that is broadly similar to those described as having been used on the Georges River.

Each oyster dredger typically had their own boat, equipped with an oyster dredge and a windlass. The oyster dredger would row to the dredging location. He would then either anchor his boat or attach it to a stake driven into the bottom. He would then let out a warp line to allow the boat to drift with the tide, out to the length to be dredged. The dredge would then be thrown over the stern, and the windlass first used to haul in the warp line, both pulling the boat back to its starting position and dragging the dredge along the bottom. The windlass was then used to raise the dredge, containing oysters, and empty its contents into the boat. The dredge itself consisted of an iron frame with a rectangular opening that led into a net, made of interlocking iron rings, closed at the far end. The dredges used on Georges River were around 4 foot six inches wide (1.372 m), but would be substituted with a narrower one, 2 foot six inches (0.762 m) wide, if there were likely to be rocks or other obstructions on the bottom. The water in which dredging operations took place in the Georges River estuary varied between 14 feet (4.3 m) and 50 feet (15.2 m) in depth. In shallower water, tongs were used.

For a time, large harvests were taken, depleting the natural sub-tidal beds. Criticisms of dredging were that it damaged many of the oysters, so that a portion were unsalable, and it was indiscriminate, resulting in many immature oysters being lost. It was also ultimately unsustainable and damaged the natural oyster beds and disturbed the bottom of the estuary.

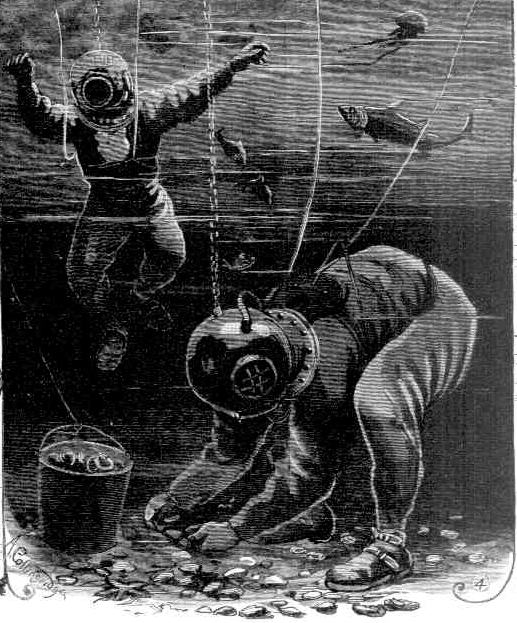
Divers gathering oysters, c.1883

As oysters became scarcer, divers were employed by Emerson to harvest the remaining oysters growing in parts of the estuary that were unsuitable for dredging. Diving was used as early as 1876. Divers worked from punts, and up to around forty-five feet of water. An implication of divers working to those depths is that the turbidity of the river water, in those times, was lower than it is now.

The river has sharks, but divers believed that they were able to deter these sharks by opening the wristband of their diving suit and releasing large air bubbles into water; divers were more concerned about annoying bream attracted by broken oysters. A criticism of the divers was that, being paid by the bag, they indiscriminately took both large and small (immature) oysters, inhibiting the breeding of oysters in the natural oyster beds.

Oyster beds were replenished using small oysters that had settled on rocks and mangroves elsewhere in the estuary, from around 1873. Smaller oysters from Port Hacking were relocated to the Georges River, to replenish the natural oyster beds. Even with some replenishment, by the beginning of the 1890s, New South Wales oyster production became unable to fully satisfy domestic demand for oysters, and large numbers of oysters were imported from New Zealand and Queensland.

== Oyster farming ==
=== Suitable conditions ===
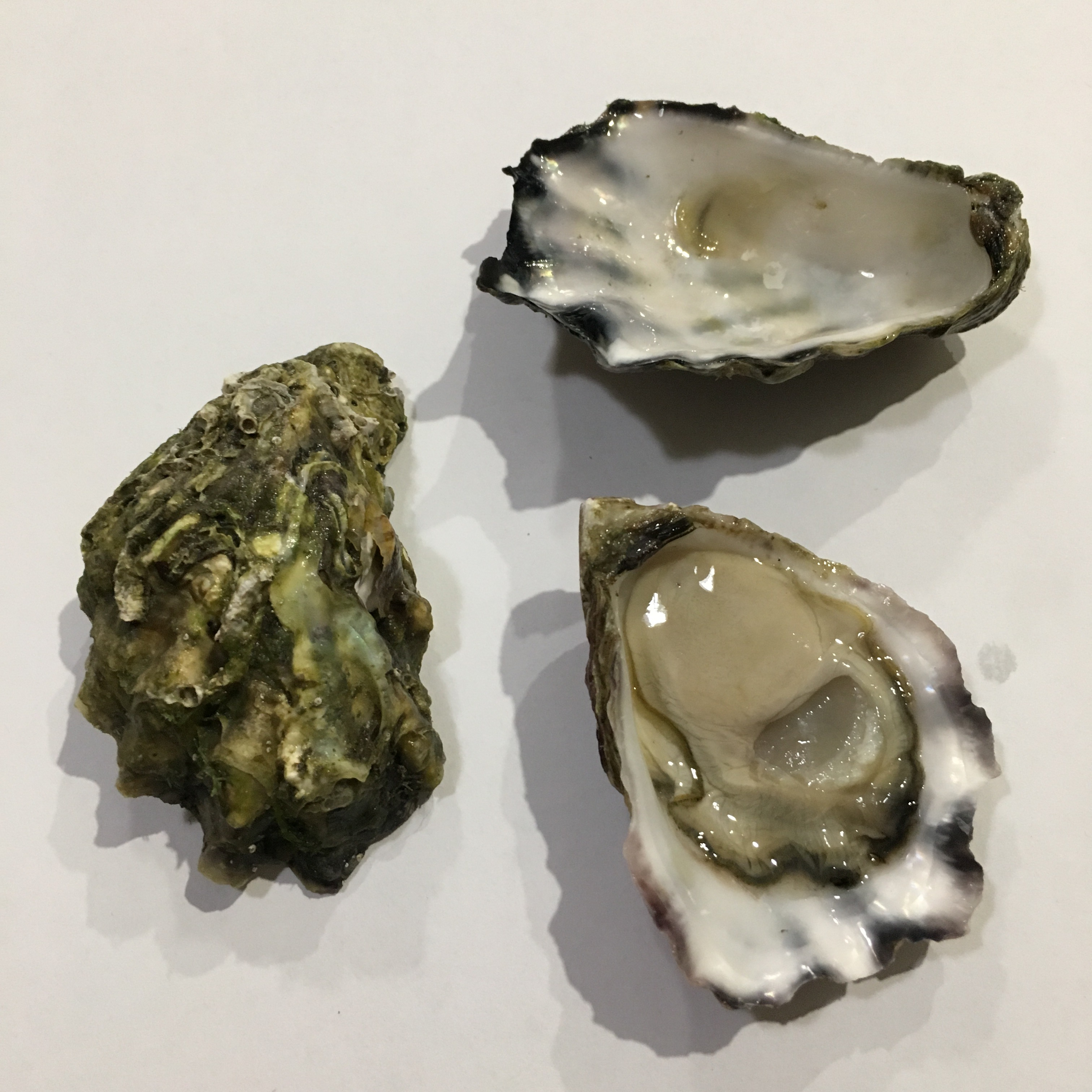
Sydney Rock Oyster, on the half shell, with two empty lower valves.

Freshwater from the Woronora River, a tributary that joins the Georges River, at Como, opposite Oatley, caused suitable growing conditions—clean water and slightly reduced salinity— for faster-growing, plump rock oysters. For a short coastal river, Georges River has a relatively large catchment of 930 km^{2}. There is a significant freshwater component in the flow of the Georges River itself; at times a small standing wave develops across the narrow part of the river estuary, between Jewfish Point (Oatley) and the opposite southern shore (Illawong), when the flow of the Georges River meets the incoming flood tide. The upper part of the river is fluvial, and salinity in the river increases as the river flows downstream. The salinity level is most suitable for rock oysters, in the tidal part of the river that lies downstream from around Soily Bottom Point, at Lugarno. The lower Georges River—a ria— also had extensive mudbanks and wide shallow bays, exposed at low tide and well suited to inter-tidal oyster cultivation. Overall, conditions in this part of the Georges River estuary and the lower part of its tributary, Woronora River, were once ideal for oyster farming.

The river also had the advantage that it was the only oyster growing area, within the suburban area of the largest market, Sydney. It was also close to transport, even in earlier years, once the railway reached the river, at Como. In the 1880s, its shoreline was mainly unpopulated and that allowed oyster farming to become established, prior to later urbanisation.

Other estuaries in Sydney, such as Sydney Harbour and Port Hacking, although having some freshwater inflows, have much smaller catchments, and are more saline than the oyster growing areas on the Georges River; oysters that grow there do not fatten sufficiently quickly to support a commercial industry. Sydney Harbour is also relatively deep, limiting the available sites for inter-tidal aquaculture, and its deep-water port and relatively earlier settlement led to the extensive presence of foreshore industries, some of which were polluting. In the case of Sydney Harbour, by the mid-1880s, there was already too much demand for access to foreshores, for other purposes, and applications for oyster leases there were rejected. Discharge from Folly Point sewage treatment works increased the health risk associated with oysters; taking wild oysters from the adjacent foreshore of Middle Harbour was prohibited by 1914. In the Hawkesbury River and Brisbane Water estuaries, to Sydney's immediate north, there were some areas suited to oyster growing, but production there never rivalled that of Georges River.

Other suitable estuaries, such as Port Stephens, especially around Karuah, are further from the main market but, due to the excellent live-storage life of unopened rock oysters, could supply the market. Other estuaries in New South Wales were producing oysters for the Sydney market by 1887.

=== Regulation ===
The industry had been covered by an act of the New South Wales Parliament, from 1862, when the Oyster Fisheries Act was passed. It made it lawful for a lessee "to form or lay down any artificial oyster bed or to improve any natural oyster bed on the shore .... bordering on the sea or any estuary ". Among its regulations was a prohibition on the sale of oysters in the months from October to January (inclusive). The regulations, otherwise, did little more than provide rights to leaseholders and penalties for theft of oysters. The next significant Act was that of 1868; among other things, it prohibited use of live oysters for lime burning.

On the 29 September 1876, a Royal Commissioner was appointed "to inquire into the best mode of cultivating the oyster, of utilising, improving, and maintaining the natural oyster beds of the colony, and also as to the legislation necessary to carry out these objects". Parliament passed the Fisheries Bill in 1881, and the natural oyster beds on the Georges River were closed for a period. The natural oyster beds in the river were reopened to dredge harvesting, in June 1883.

The most long-lasting and significant changes were made in 1884. Leases for oyster farms on "land below the high tide mark" could be granted, for not more than fifteen years, after which time the lease would go to an auction or tender. However, a lease could be renewed if, after twelve years, it was found to be well-stocked with oysters and to have been properly worked by the lessee, in accordance with the conditions and requirements of the lease. The act allowed the Crown to suspend a lease, if it had become depleted of oysters, and close it to production for a period of three years to allow replenishment. A royalty payment was placed upon harvested oysters. Burning live oysters for lime was prohibited and made subject to a £50 fine.

=== Beginnings of inter-tidal oyster farming ===
By the mid-1870s, natural oyster beds in the estuary were seriously depleted from the combined effects of lime burning and dredge harvesting.

Even before the catastrophic arrival of the mudworm, some had begun to farm Sydney Rock Oysters, on rocks near the shoreline or deliberately placed on mudbanks in the estuary, or on upright sticks installed on the mudbanks and shallows, creating an artificial inter-tidal zone habitat for the oysters. Production using these methods began in earnest around 1880. By 1886, oyster farmers were established at Neverfail Bay, at Oatley, where oyster farming activities would continue until around 1996. The railway had arrived at Como, in late 1885, allowing their product to be transported to market. Also in 1886, oyster leases were applied for in many locations along the estuary of the Georges River, ranging from Quibray Bay (Kurnell) upstream to Little Moon Bay (on the western side of modern-day Lugarno). The applicants included earlier industry participants, Alfred Emerson and interests associated with the Holt family, but also a number of newer entrants.

So depleted had the estuary become that oyster farmers continued to relocate smaller oysters from Port Hacking. The entrepreneur J.H. Geddes attempted that, on a large scale, in 1888. He relocated 100 bags of small oysters from Port Hacking to his leases at Lugarno, but the attempt was not successful. Over time, the relocation of small oysters (spat) from other estuaries, to mature and fatten in the Georges River estuary, would become an important aspect of the industry. However, importing spat from New Zealand would cause a crisis for the fledgling industry, and for the ecology of the river.

=== Silting, mudworm, and changes in the river ecology ===
The year 1887, was a particularly bad year for the oyster industry; most New South Wales estuaries were affected by flood water, which carried silt over the oyster beds, and 'spatfall', the formation of new oysters, was poor in that year. With most of the estuaries similarly affected, production plunged. The Sydney Rock Oyster occurs naturally in New Zealand. With local spat in short supply, rock oyster spat from New Zealand was imported into estuaries in New South Wales and Southern Queensland, between around 1880 and 1898 to replenish the depleted oyster stocks. It is now generally believed that these New Zealand oysters carried Polydora websteri, the mudworm, a serious pest for oysters. The recent silting created ideal conditions for the mudworm. Infestations of mudworms, combined with the impact of earlier silting, permanently destroyed the already depleted sub-tidal oyster reefs and beds in the affected estuaries, effectively ending dredge harvesting of oysters. The few remaining natural sub-tidal oyster beds now occur, on hard bottoms in locations with high estuarine flow, in places such as the southern arm of Manning River and Berry's Canal, and some remnant natural inter-tidal oyster reefs still exist, the largest being in the Hunter River. It is estimated that 99% of the now vastly reduced natural oyster reefs in Australia are functionally extinct, meaning that those reefs no longer play any significant function in the ecosystem.

In 1887, a series of heavy freshets—floods of fresh water that empty into the ocean, after flowing through the estuary—had deposited three inches of silt over the natural oyster beds in the Georges River, smothering many oysters. New Zealand oysters were translocated to the Georges River in 1886, and mudworm became a problem there during 1887. After the estuary was affected by mudworm, in 1888, dredge harvesting ceased entirely, but divers remained working in the Georges River oyster industry, until at the earliest 1908.

In its mature phase, the naturally occurring Native or Mud oyster (Ostrea angasi), is an entirely sub-tidal species; mudworm and silting—coupled with earlier over-exploitation of the resource—caused the oyster species' local extinction, north of the Clyde River. It was declared locally extinct in the Georges River, in 1896, although its shells may still be found in the area. Only the inter-tidal growths of rock oysters were left. Sydney Rock Oysters, grown in the inter-tidal zone, would become the basis of commercial oyster farming, on the Georges River and other New South Wales estuaries.

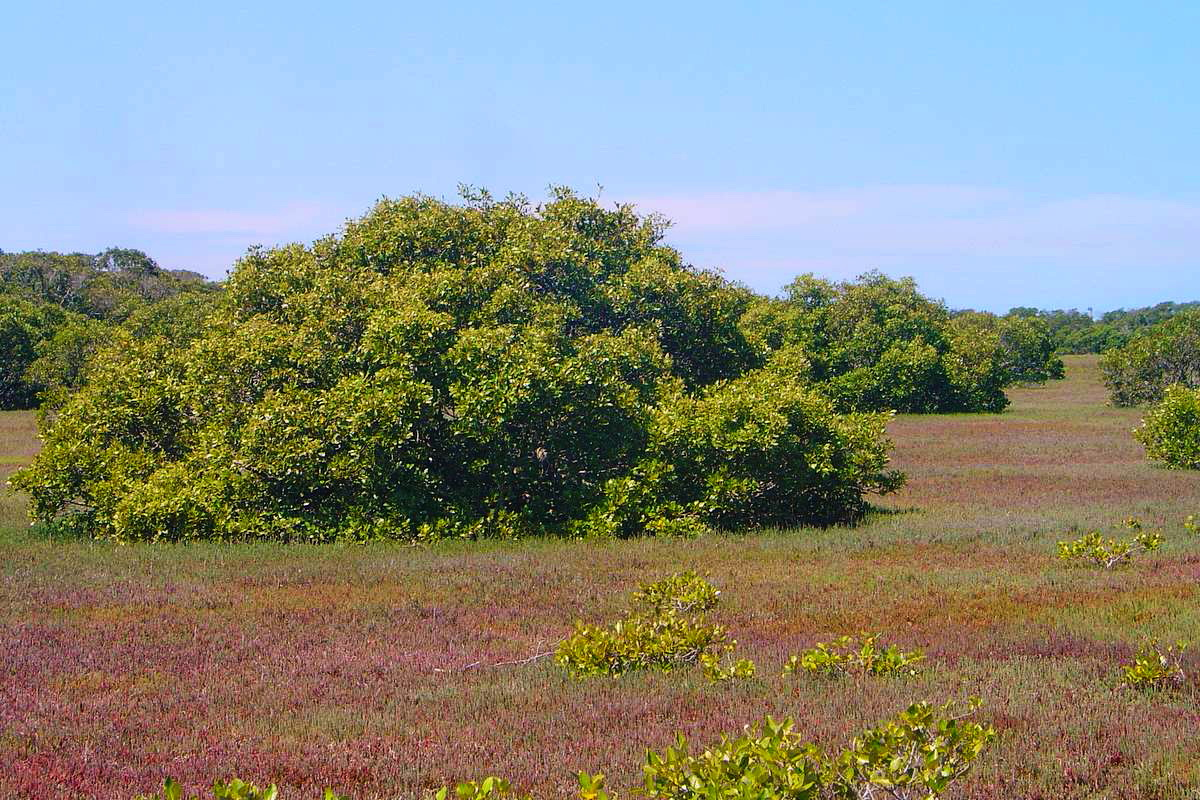
Salt marsh interspersed with stands of young mangroves, Towra Point, Georges River estuary, 2018.

Over time, the impact of the mud worm became less of a barrier to oyster culture, but the loss of the oyster reefs adversely impacted biodiversity. Mudworm itself affected biodiversity; as well as sub-tidal oysters, other species of bivalves, including Venus clams (Veneridae), once found in profusion, disappeared from estuaries.

The silting of the river and nutrient-rich runoff, due to urbanisation, has led over time to the replacement of most of the salt marshes, along the estuary, with mangrove forests; the mangroves (Avicennia marina) were previously a fringe on the waterside edge of the salt marsh, but expanded landward as the bays began to be more silted. Much of that change has occurred since 1930. The process appears irreversible and probably was accelerated by climate change and rising sea levels and, from the 1990s, by waterlogged wheel ruts caused by illegal use of recreational vehicles in remnant salt marshes.

=== Techniques, local experience and scientific study ===
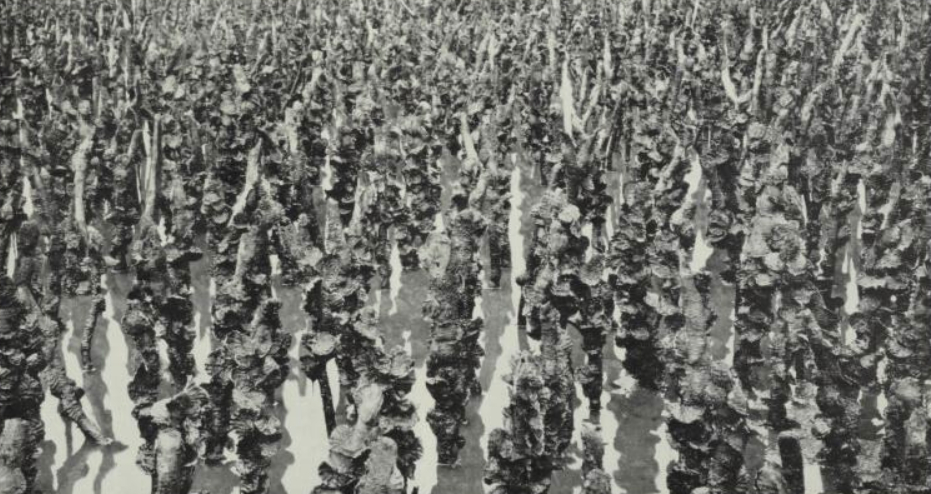
Cultivated Sydney rock oysters growing on sticks of mangrove wood. This photograph was taken on Hawkesbury River in 1937.

Without a suitable model for oyster farming to emulate, local oyster farmers needed to develop techniques best suited to local conditions. Various methods were used in the earlier years of inter-tidal oyster farming on the Georges River. All the methods relied on setting oyster spat on a suitable surface, where the oysters could then grow to maturity.

A simple earlier method was to place large sticks, oriented vertically, into the bottom in the inter-tidal zone, providing a surface for spat to set and mature. The sticks were locally available wood; typically 'swamp oak' (Casuarina glauca) or 'white honeysuckle' (Banksia integrifolia).

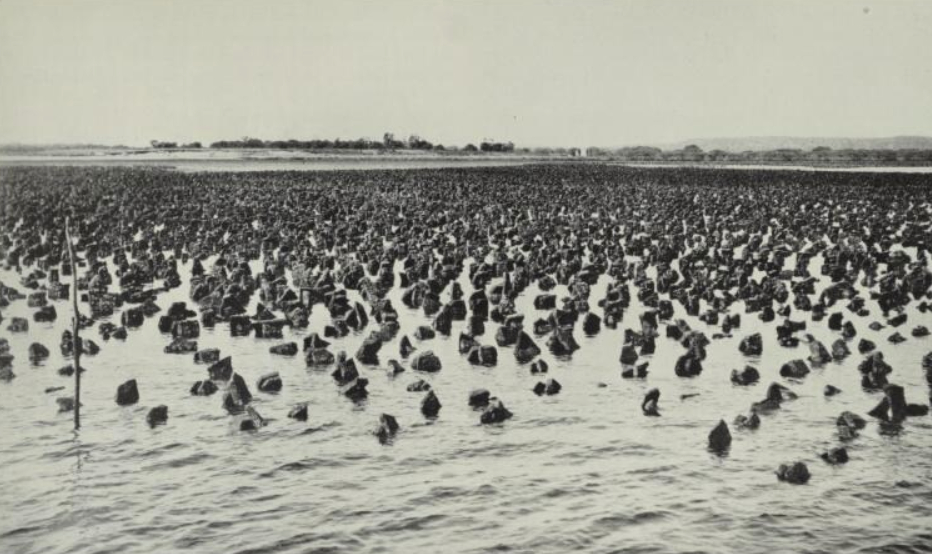
Oyster farm at Pelican Point on Woolooware Bay, Georges River, with stone slabs (taken in 1921 by T.C. Roughley). This lease alone had half a million slabs. Slabs were arranged in pairs as an inverted-'V'.

Other earlier oyster farms used rock slabs placed on river mudbanks or on tidal flats in bays. The method essentially mimicked the natural inter-tidal growth of oysters on the rocky foreshore. Slabs were sometimes arranged in pairs, stacked like an inverted 'V', as it was found that spat would settle best on the protected underside of the slabs. Once the oysters were established, the faces of the slab were rotated exposing the oysters. The rock slabs were needed in such numbers that stone was quarried specifically for that purpose. The largest of these quarries, at Kyle Bay, supplied over half a million rocks.

A similar method was to use terracotta, slate, or fibro-cement roofing tiles instead of stone slabs. In the inter-tidal zone, the tiles were sometimes placed in an inverted 'V' and sometimes laid against wooden supports. Tiles usually had a larger surface area for their weight, and were easier to relocate than stone slabs. As a variant of the method using tiles, as late as 1908, divers were still being used to place the oyster-covered roof tiles on the bottom in deeper water, to allow the oysters to mature. Disadvantages of the methods using stone and tiles were that these were labour-intensive—harvesting involved knocking off each oyster with a hammer or other tool— it was relatively difficult to relocate the oysters elsewhere in the estuary, and that, at least without using divers, the method could only be used where the bottom was exposed at low tide.

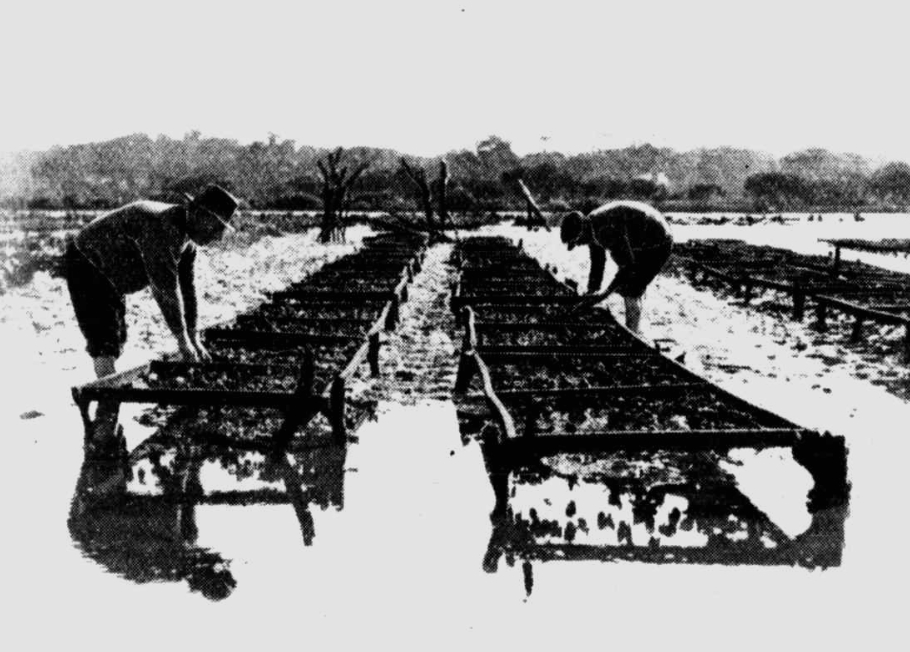
Early 'tray and rail' farming, 1929.

By the early 1920s, some oyster farmers were fattening mature oysters by placing the oysters on wire netting trays, which were in turn placed on timber frames, or 'rails', which kept the trays within the inter-tidal zone and were embedded in the bottom. This method became known as 'tray and rail'. It had the advantage that the level of the oysters was not dictated by the level of the bottom, allowing inter-tidal oyster leases to be extended into deeper water. It also kept the oysters well above the muddy bottom, reducing the risk of mudworm attack.

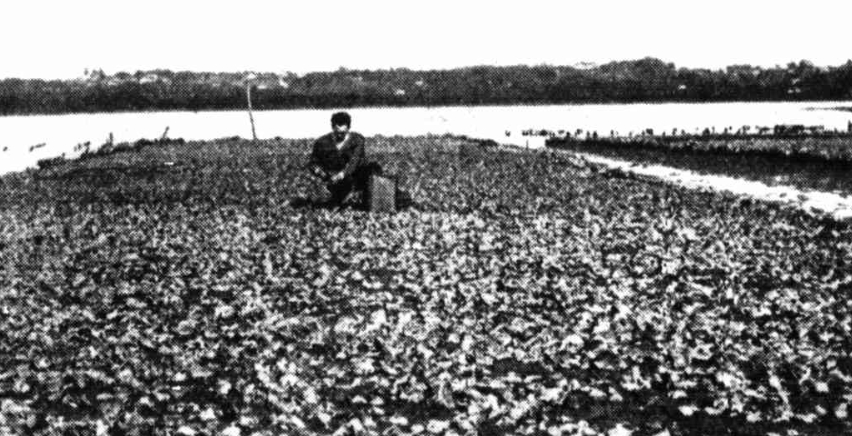
Oyster farm with man-made inter-tidal oyster beds, 1929.

Another method was to build banks over shallow inter-tidal mudflats, excavating the mud between the banks to create channels, and then topping the banks with clean oyster shells, creating artificial inter-tidal oyster beds, close to shore but above the level of the mud; it was also an expedient method of oyster shell waste disposal, during the times when much of the oyster crop was sold in bottles, without shells. Some of these oyster shell banks still exist, especially near former oyster processing sites on the river.

A problem for the industry was a poorly understood condition known as 'winter mortality'. Zoologist, Theodore Roughley, suggested a method to manage, but not eliminate, the disease in 1926, leading the industry to expand greatly on the Georges River.

Relocating trays of more mature oysters to locations with less saline water and placing those on frames higher in the inter-tidal zone, during winter, became known as 'wintering', a means of managing 'winter mortality'.

In the Georges River estuary, after the 1920s, the predominant technique of farming the immature oysters (up to two years) used frames of horizontal sticks ('stick and rail'), and that for more mature oysters, used wooden-framed wire netting trays ('tray and rail') that could be relocated within the estuary.

=== Heyday of oyster farming ===
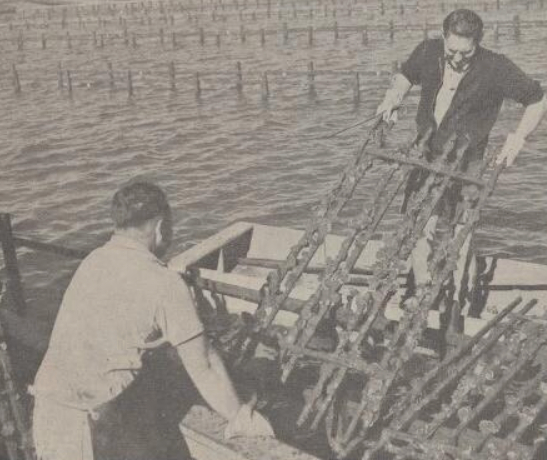
Georges River oyster farmers gathering sticks of immature (two year old) oysters for relocation onto trays. (c.1966)

For over a century, Sydney Rock Oysters were grown commercially on the Georges River. Production grew rapidly from the 1930s to the 1960s. One reason for the rapid growth in production was so-called 'highway farming', under which oysters were moved between estuaries by road, taking advantage of the characteristics of different estuaries for different stages of the oysters' growth. Other reasons were that the widespread adoption of the 'tray and rail' made oyster farming less labour-intensive, increasing productivity, and had also reduced the impacts of mudworm and 'winter mortality'.

The oyster leases remained largely in the hands of individuals and families, some of whom, such as the Drake and Derwent families, had worked the river since the 1870s. Farmers on the river generally cooperated with one another as separate, but sometimes related, family businesses. Some of the oyster farming families remained in the industry on Georges River for three or four generations. After the First World War, the number of oyster farmers on the estuary was boosted by returning soldiers who took up oyster leases. These new farmers were assisted to become established by the existing oyster farmers.

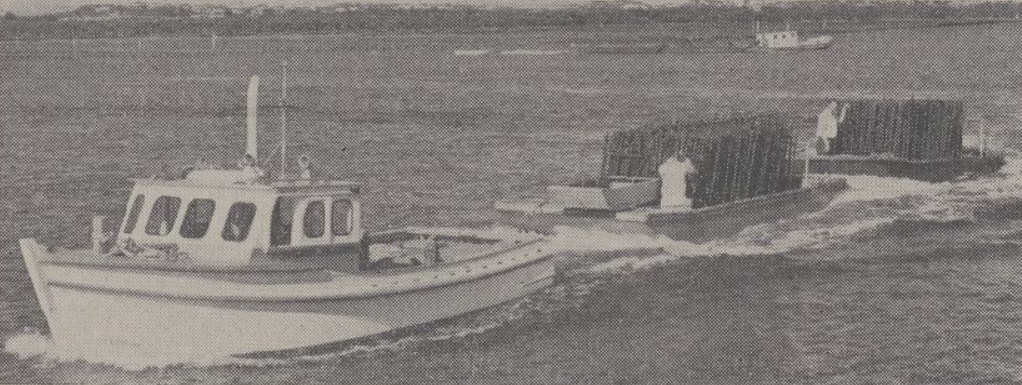
Boat towing barges, loaded with sticks of immature oysters, up Georges River c.1966

The oyster farmers of New South Wales formed the NSW Oyster Farmers Association, to advocate for their interests. The annual conference typically was held at a location close to the Georges River, such as Dolls Point, Sandringham, or Rockdale. The conferences included competitions for the best commercial oysters (under various categories). Georges River oysters, dominated the competition, sometimes winning in all or most categories. Delegates consumed large amounts of their product and other seafood, and hosted a contest for oyster-eating champion of New South Wales. The 1951 champion, an oyster farmer, consumed 26 dozen rock oysters in 30 minutes, in front of a crowd of 3,000. In 1949, a woman from one of the Georges River oyster-growing families, opened 90 dozen oysters in an hour and a half, a sustained rate of a dozen a minute.

There was a long-standing and lucrative criminal activity involving the theft of oysters from leases in the Georges River estuary. In late 1934, shots were fired at oyster poachers by police patrolling the leases.

The industry on the Georges River reached its productive peak in the 1970s. In the financial year 1976–1977, the river produced 2,563 tonnes of oysters, over a quarter of the record statewide production total of 9,375 tonnes (that statewide total being equivalent to 204 million oysters).

=== Distribution and sale ===
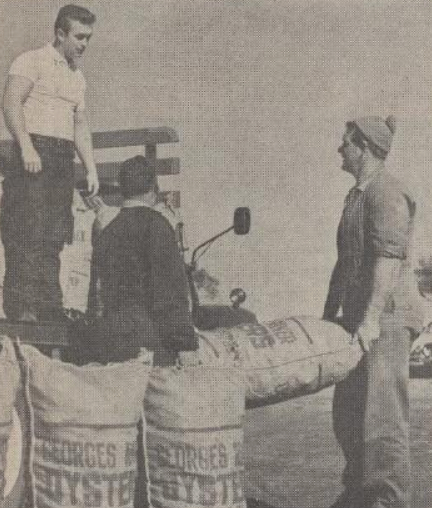
Loading bagged Georges River oysters (c.1966) Each standard three bushel hessian bag contained 100 dozen oysters.

Oysters were dispatched unopened to wholesale markets, such as Sydney Fish Market, but some were opened and then bottled, either by the oyster farmers or seafood wholesalers. Unopened oysters were dispatched in hessian bags. Up to the 1960s, bags of oysters were sent to market, from Oatley railway station, by electric rail parcel vans.

Some of the oyster crop was sold, after being removed from the shell and bottled. Although oysters are better—both in taste and, potentially, also in bacterial count—when opened soon before being eaten on the half shell, the practice of bottling was common, at least into the 1980s. 'Bottle grade' rock oysters are generally smaller (29 - 40g) than 'plate grade' (40 - 67g).

The method of bottling used in Australia is to remove the oysters from their shell, and bottle them in clean fresh water, with some salt added. Like other opened oysters, bottled oysters greatly benefit from refrigeration, although in earlier times, they were sold from baskets by vendors at locations such as the pedestrian overbridge at Sutherland railway station.' Bottling of oysters still occurs in New South Wales, but is now relatively less common.

== Decline and end of oyster farming ==
Oyster farming survived opposition from Georges River Oyster Lease Protest Association (GROLPA), Lugarno and District Progress Association, East Como Progress Association, Kogarah Council and—to a lesser extent—Hurstville Council, reduced freshwater flows from the Woronora River due to Woronora Dam, dredging for the shipping port in Botany Bay, impacts of Tributyltin (TBT) anti-fouling compound for boats, invasive wild Pacific Oysters, increasing urbanisation, river silting, and increasing water turbidity and pollution.

By the 1960s, increasing urbanisation around the estuary was becoming a threat to the oyster industry. In 1963, Gwawley Bay, was turned into the canal estate, Sylvania Waters, and that major oyster growing area was lost to the industry. Elsewhere in the estuary, space allocated for jetties and boat ramps on waterfront properties, was taken from existing foreshore oyster leases, reducing the area of the leases. Opposition to oyster leases resulted in an end to foreshore leases in some areas, and a requirement, from 1965 to 1966, that oysters leases needed to be at least 45 feet from the high water mark and kept away from recreation reserves. Despite these changes, in 1976, there were around 100 oyster farmers in the estuary.

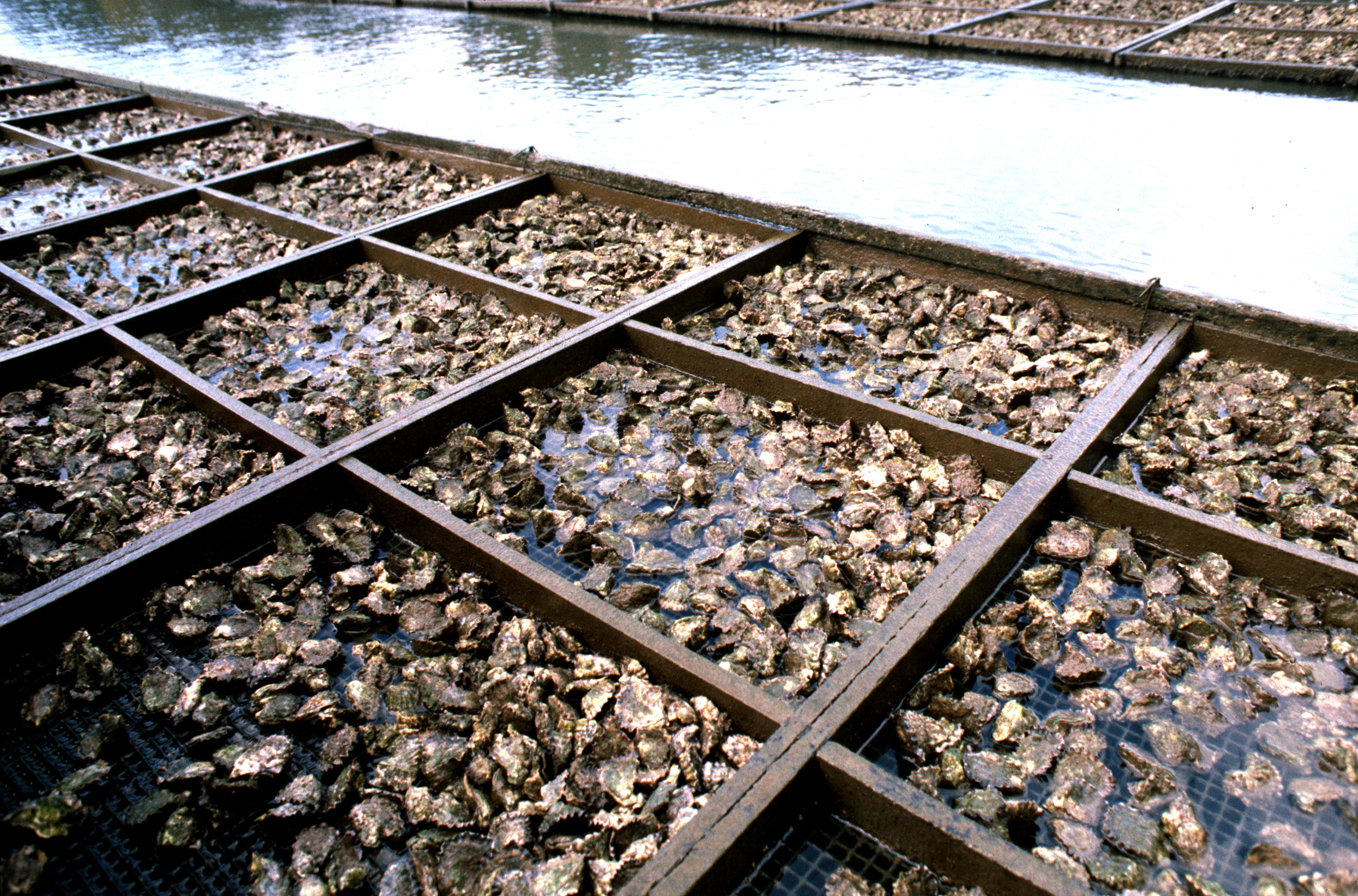
Maturing Sydney rock oysters on trays (Georges River, 1989)

In the early 1970s, oyster farmers allied with local conservation and civic groups to fight council reclamation projects at Lime Kiln Bay, where a garbage dump was planned, and Oatley Bay, motivated by their concern that contaminated water would leach into the river and affect water quality. Hurstville Council had plans to reclaim land not only in Lime Kiln Bay but also at Edith Bay (Lugarno) and Jewfish Bay and Gungah Bay (both at Oatley), all oyster growing sites. The council's reasoning was that silting caused by urban runoff was 'naturally' reclaiming the bays, and the reclamation works would just advance a 'natural' process; the same process by which mangroves had advanced over the former salt marshes, during the previous four decades. A public display of the proposed reclamation areas resulted in strong public opposition, and eventually the plans were shelved.

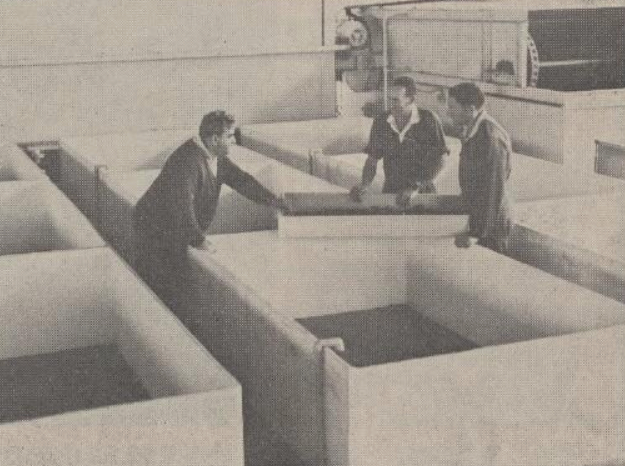
Depuration tanks, Taren Point (1966).

A major gastroenteritis event was traced to Georges River oysters, in 1978. There were recriminations between oyster farmers and the NSW Government, over the ultimate responsibility for the contaminated oysters reaching the market, and a decrease of the public's confidence in the safety of oysters from the river. Changes were made; harvesting was suspended after heavy rain events, water quality tested regularly, and oysters were subjected to depuration, with 36 to 48-hours of filtration and ultra-violet exposure, in a small cooperative facility at Neverfail Bay, Oatley. A similar facility, based on British practice, had been in use at Taren Point, since the mid-1960s, at latest. Changes to the sewage system were also made, with discharges from upstream sewage plants at Glenfield and Liverpool redirected to the ocean outfall at Malabar. However, the decline in the industry in the Georges River estuary had begun around 1978.

Another blow to the industry occurred in 1985, when the movement of spat from Port Stephens was prohibited. Some estuaries have locations that favour high rates of Sydney rock oyster spat production, but those same locations are usually not ideal for fattening oysters. Oyster farmers on the Georges River had obtained their rock oyster spat from Port Stephens, bringing the spat to grow into plump oysters on the Georges River.

From around 1967, small numbers of wild Pacific oysters were found in southern NSW estuaries, and it spread northward as far as Port Stephens by 1973, but the species did not become established in significant numbers. Around 1984, the Pacific oyster was illegally introduced to Port Stephens, and became well-established; the risk of its being introduced accidentally to other rock oyster producing estuaries led to a ban on movements of any oysters from Port Stephens to other estuaries. At the time, oyster stock from Port Stephens accounted for 70% of the state's oyster production. Unfortunately, the ban came too late to stop some wild Pacific oysters entering Georges River, and in Port Stephens—once the largest producer of Sydney rock oysters in the state—rock oyster farming reduced dramatically, as the wild Pacific oyster infestation largely took over the estuary. Georges River / Botany Bay is one of four estuaries that are considered "as high risk for Pacific Oysters based on the abundance of wild Pacific Oysters from a 2010 statewide survey and extensive industry consultation". By 2010, wild Pacific Oysters were present in all NSW estuaries from Hastings River southward.

To save an oyster industry in Port Stephens, many farmers converted to farming Pacific oysters. The (fertile, diploid) Pacific Oyster (Crassostrea gigas, also known as Magallana gigas) was declared a Class 2 Noxious Fish, under the Fisheries Management Act, 1994, for all waters in New South Wales, except Port Stephens, meaning that oyster farmers in other estuaries had to kill any wild Pacific oysters on their leases. Pacific oysters (also known as creuse oysters in Europe) have been associated with the reduction of multiple native oyster fisheries including, Olympia oysters, Sydney Rock Oysters in New Zealand, and much of the European flat oyster fishery. Its spread has been due to both accidental and intentional introduction of the species to habitats outside its original range. The Pacific Oyster has become the dominant oyster species in aquaculture, by 2000 accounting for 98% of global oyster production. It has, by weight, the largest production rate of any marine species (of any kind), by 2003, 4.38 million tonnes per year. However, as late as 2012–2013, despite fears that wild Pacific Oyster growths would smother the rock oysters, Sydney Rock Oysters still made up 88% of commercially produced oysters in NSW.

Despite the precautions and improvements following the 1978 gastroenteritis event, there was another food poisoning event in May 1990, when Sydney Water failed to advise Georges River oyster farmers of a large sewage overflow upstream, which occurred after a satisfactory water quality test. Sales were banned for a period. The timing was bad because Georges River oysters dominated the market from April to August. Such events damaged the reputation of oysters from the river, causing consumers to shun Georges River oysters.

In 1992, there was a catastrophic outbreak of 'winter mortality', a poorly understood seasonal disease caused by a protozoan parasite, Mikiocytos roughleyi. Oysters that are near maturity, and soon to be harvested, are worst affected by the disease, increasing the impact of any losses. Georges River oyster farmers had limited the impact of winter mortality, by moving their oysters on trays, to more sheltered waters with lower salinity, such as near the Woronora River confluence and Bonnet Bay, and placing the trays on racks higher in the intertidal zone. This 'wintering' method—first proposed by eminent oyster zoologist, Theodore Roughley, in the 1920s—was not effective, in 1992, with the Georges River oyster harvest down by 70%.

Most oyster farming activity on the river finally succumbed in the mid-1990s, to the spread of 'QX disease'. QX is caused by a protozoan parasite, Marteilia sydneyi, which affects Sydney Rock Oysters. It had been present, in the Richmond, Tweed and Clarence river estuaries, since the 1970s, leading to a decline in oyster farming there. When it first appeared in Georges River in 1994, it wiped out 90% of the farmed oysters, in affected areas. Effects of QX were worst in parts of the river with lower salinity. The first area affected was Lugarno and QX spread downstream over the next few years, until all the oyster growing locations in the estuary, apart from Quibray Bay, were affected by late 1999.

QX-resistant Sydney rock oyster strains came too late to save most of the Georges River industry. Although selective breeding of oyster strains can reduce mortality due to QX, it was expected to take four generations of selective breeding to achieve a mortality rate of around 10%, an acceptable level for commercial viability. Most oyster farmers on Georges River could not survive that long, and most remaining oyster farmers gave up their leases in the estuary in 1996–1997. Prior to QX, there were still 89 oyster farming leases, over an area of 94.6 hectares of the estuary, and around 40 oyster farmers, but by late 1999, only seven oyster farmers remained on working leases.

Farming continued downstream at Woolooware Bay, initially by bringing in immature oysters, from the Hawkesbury and Wallis Lake, and fattening them before February and March, when the QX virus was most virulent. Later, approval was given to farm (infertile) triploid Pacific Oysters, which are not susceptible to QX disease, in the Georges River estuary. These measures ensured that a vestige of the Georges River industry survived, while QX resistant Sydney Rock Oysters were being bred. In 2010, the estuary was hit with Pacific Oyster Mortality Syndrome (POMS), and both (infertile) farmed and wild Pacific oysters in the estuary died in great numbers. Fortunately, by 2011, the last oyster farmers on the estuary were able to resume production of Sydney Rock Oysters, which were not only QX-resistant but also much faster maturing than earlier rock oysters. There was optimism about a revival of the industry on the Georges River.

In 2012, the last of the old Georges River oyster-farming families, the Drakes, sold their leases and business. In 2023, the last oyster farm in the estuary, Robert Hill, who took over from the Drakes. was forced to close, because the landward side of the last oyster farming site needed decontamination. The second last oyster farmer, John Hedison, had left the industry in late 2017, for similar reasons. The future of the estuary as an oyster growing area is now uncertain.

== Aftermath ==
Production of Sydney Rock Oysters in New South Wales plunged, between 1980 and 2018; Georges River production became negligible, Port Stephens production fell by 75%, and QX spread to other estuaries, such as the Hawkesbury. Production never recovered to be anywhere near the previous record levels. In 2018–2019, around 76 million individual oysters were harvested in New South Wales, only around the same number that had been harvested in 1955.

By 2020, after Port Stephens was hit with Pacific Oyster Mortality Syndrome in 2013–2014, there had been a return to significant production of Sydney Rock Oysters there, but QX disease spread to the estuary for the first time in 2021, and broke out again in 2022, wiping out the rock oysters. The results obtained with QX-resistant strains has not been consistent across estuaries, as became apparent in Port Stephens during 2022. QX remains a significant threat to Sydney Rock Oysters.

Changes in the ways of farming Sydney Rock Oysters—intended to lower the environmental impact of oyster farming on seagrass beds—have been implemented, but can involve trade offs in size and in the scale of production. The traditional 'stick and rail' and 'tray and rail' techniques, that once characterised the industry on the Georges River are in decline, and are now discouraged by case by case renewals of oyster leases.

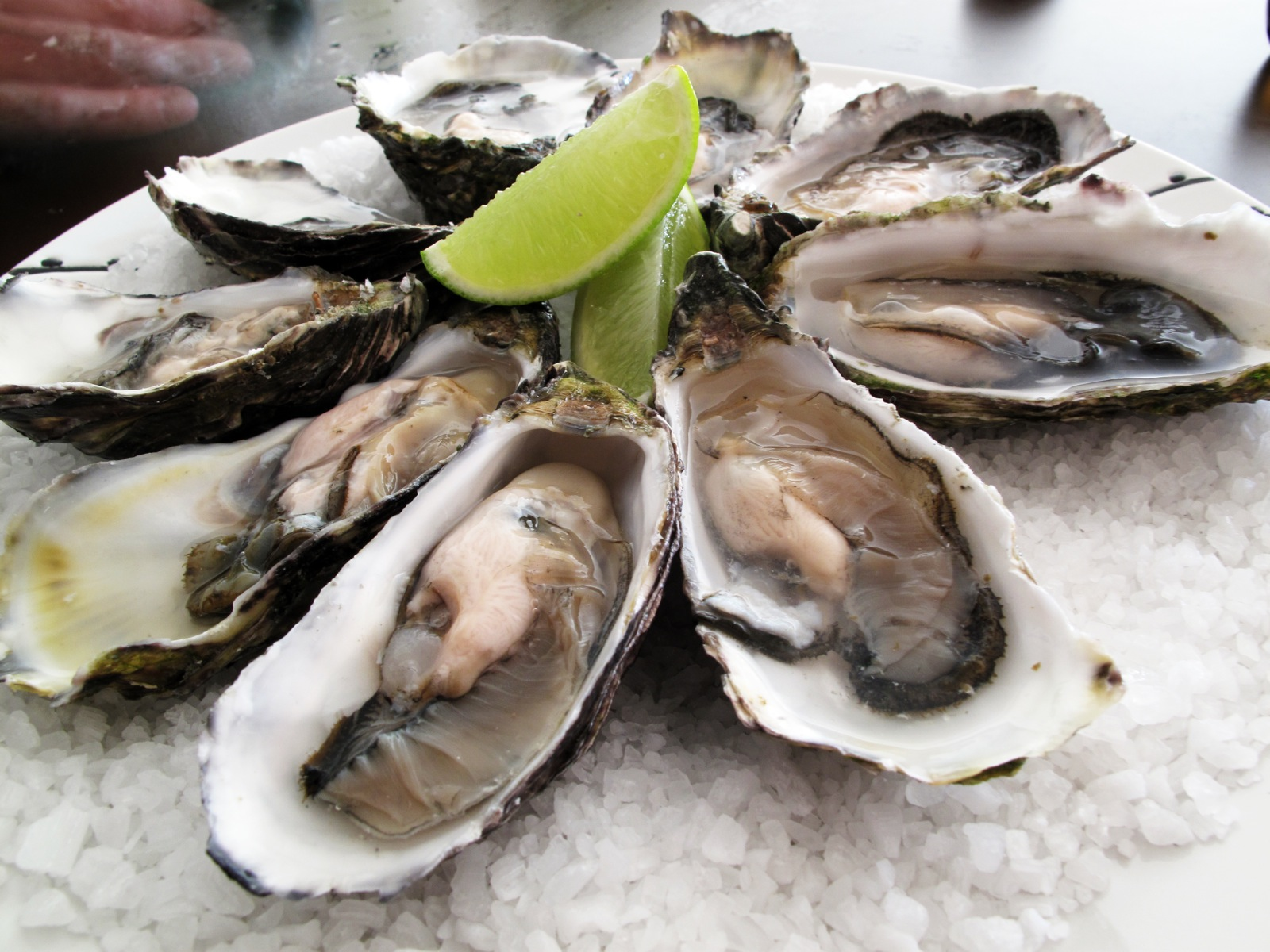
Pacific oysters on the half shell

On the demand side, changes have included competition—mainly in Pacific oysters—from other states, particularly Tasmania and South Australia, and from New Zealand, and changes in consumer preferences and population demographics. Removal of trade restrictions, such as by implementation of Closer Economic Relations has also been significant. Selective breeding of Pacific Oysters for aquaculture has not only resulted in infertile, less-invasive, disease-resistant strains but also has improved their eating quality, relative to wild oysters.

An unopened live Sydney Rock Oyster can survive out of water for up to 14 days, at temperatures of 10 to 20 °C, whereas a Pacific Oyster will last 7 days, but only if kept at a temperature of around 5 °C. Once a compelling feature, faster transport to market and controlled cooling has reduced the advantage of better keeping characteristics.

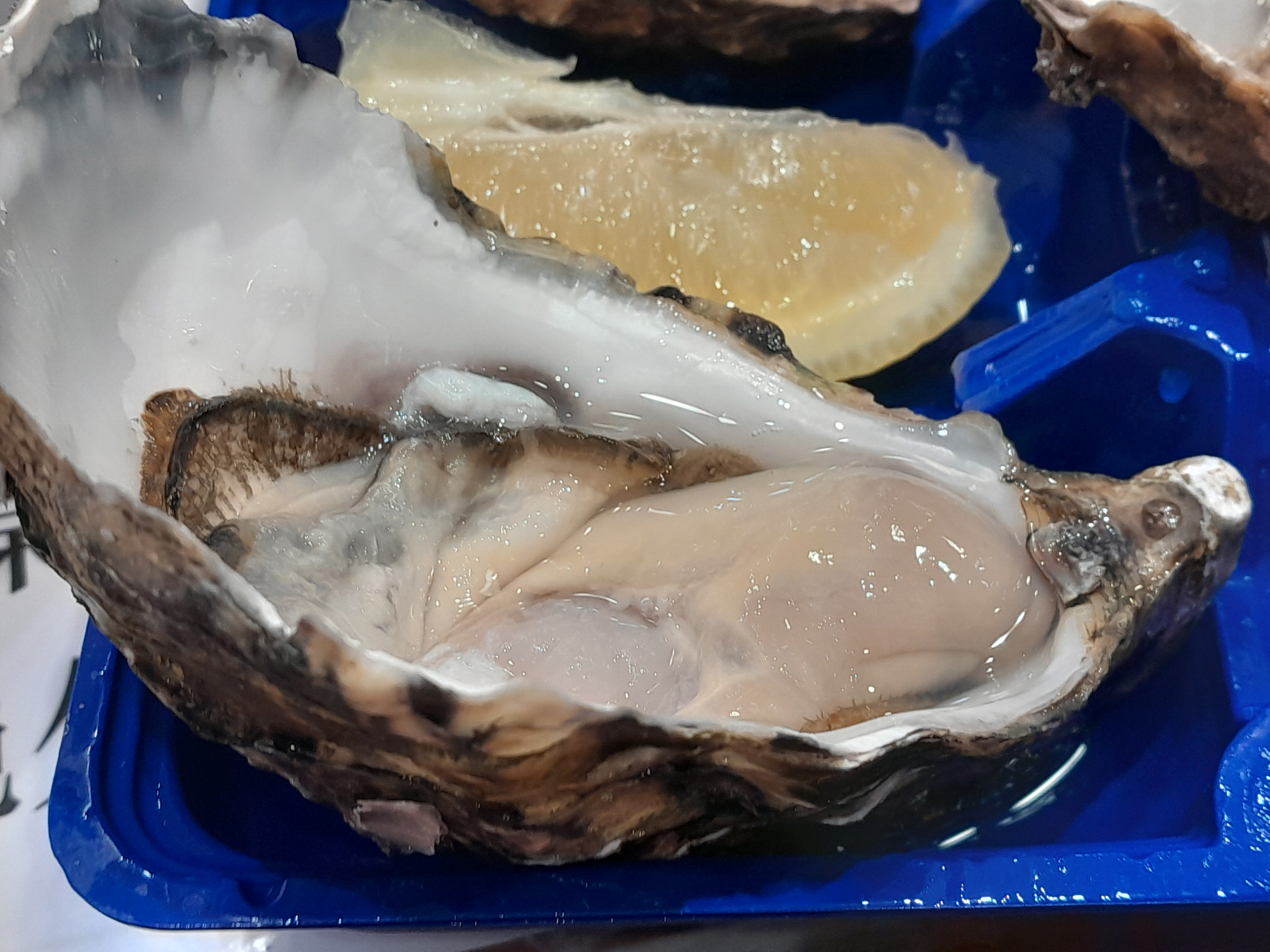
'Jumbo' grade (260g to 319g) Pacific oyster from Clyde River, NSW

While the Sydney rock oyster remains a highly regarded oyster, faster growing and generally larger Pacific oysters—once seen as a pest species in NSW—are displacing it, geographically and commercially, to a very significant extent, within New South Wales.

The growth rate of Pacific Oysters is such that they can reach a marketable size (50g), in ten months to two years, whereas Sydney Rock Oysters typically take around three to four years to be marketable.

Where infertile triploid Pacific Oysters are grown in prime esturine conditions—once the exclusive domain of the Sydney Rock Oyster—such as Clyde River, commercial oysters can be grown to over 400g in weight. Since 2019, an annual competition has been held for the largest (Pacific) oyster, resulting in long-lived specimens up to 3 kg in weight.

The Pacific Oyster is quite similar in appearance to the Sydney Rock Oyster, which can be distinguished from a Pacific Oyster by subtle differences; a somewhat smoother and thicker shell, a lighter-coloured abductor muscle scar, and the presence of 'dentiles'—small tooth-like serrations—adjacent to the hinge.

Retail prices of Pacific oysters in Sydney are now generally higher than that of Sydney Rock Oysters, with one theory being that the supply chain costs, including transport-to-market costs, of Pacific oysters are higher. However, the continuing demand for Pacific oysters—even at higher prices and, arguably, for less sophisticated consumer tastes—within the context of constraints on the supply of Sydney Rock oysters, does not auger well for the indigenous oyster.

In recent years, commercial farming of another rock oyster species, the Black-lip Rock Oyster, Saccostrea echinata—a species native to Australia's tropical waters—has commenced in both Queensland and Western Australia. Both governments are providing funding to promote development of a tropical oyster industry, with Queensland researchers at Bribie Island finding a method to produce Black-lip Rock Oyster spat in hatcheries in 2024. The first commercial oyster farm to produce Black-lip Rock Oysters, at Bowen, has now been operating successfully since around 2014.

There is a question over the future of ongoing NSW Government support for the breeding program for Sydney Rock Oyster spat. It was noted that the economics of the program would require additional government support, if Sydney Rock Oyster spat annual production was below 30-40 million. That is but a small fraction of what was needed for the record production of 204 million oysters in 1976. The future long-term commercial viability of Sydney Rock Oyster production in Australia has been questioned, as growers shift to Pacific oysters or leave the industry completely. It may be 'a dying art'.

== Oyster farming locations ==
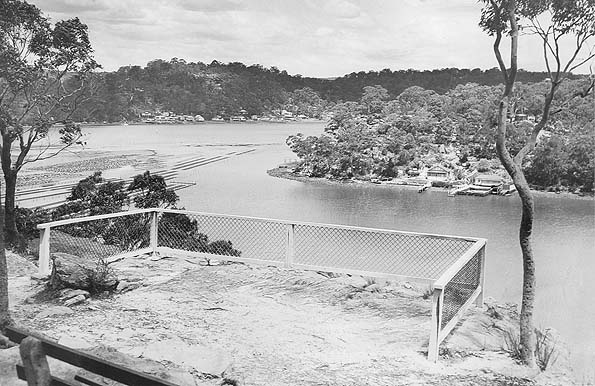
View of the mouth of Lime Kiln Bay, from Hills Lookout, on Lime Kiln Head, Oatley Park, looking toward Illawong (left) and Lugarno (right), and showing oyster farming racks (now gone) on left. (Date unknown.)

The locations below have been the sites of significant oyster farming leases in the Georges River estuary:

- Bonnet Bay
- Como
- Gwawey Bay
- Illawong
- Kangaroo Point
- Lugarno
- Oatley
- Oyster Bay
- Quibray Bay, Kurnell
- Towra Point (Carters Island)
- Weeney Bay
- Woolooware Bay (including Shell Point and Pelican Point)

Oatley Bay was an oyster farming location and there were other oyster farming locations on the left (north) bank, east of Oatley, such as Connells Point and Kyle Bay, but due to opposition to oyster leases from the local and state governments, production ceased at these locations relatively early in the 20th century.

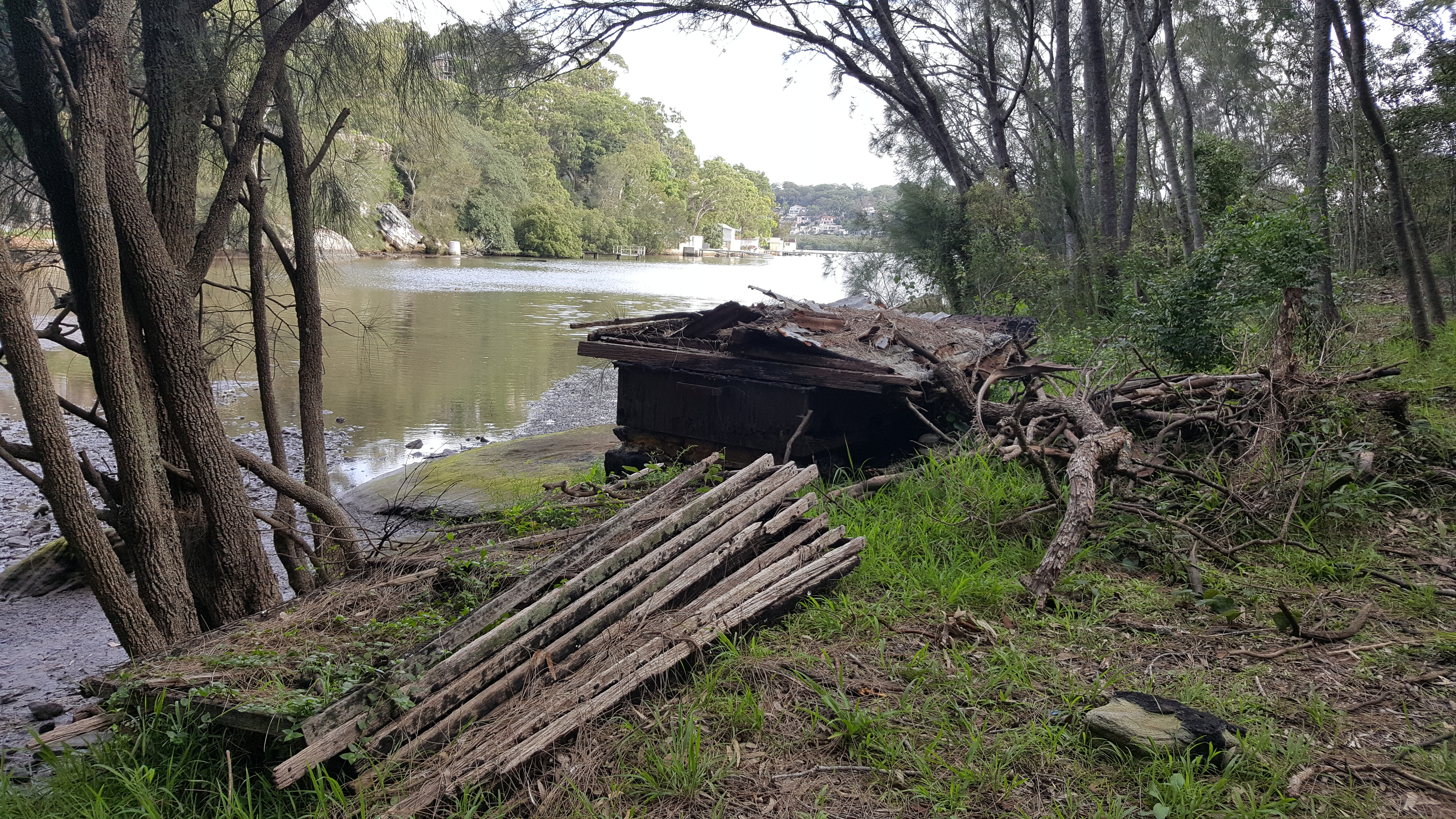
Oyster trays and tar tank at the small abandoned oyster farming site on Jewfish Bay, Oatley (April 2019).

== Remnants ==
Remnants of the oyster farming industry exist at these locations:

- Audrey Bay, Illawong
- Jewfish Bay, Oatley, just outside Oatley Park.
- Lugarno
- Neverfail Bay, Oatley
- Woolooware Bay

== Environmental restoration ==
In 2000, the Lime Kiln Bay Wetland project was completed, with the aim to improve the quality of urban runoff water, before it enters the river, and to preserve a threatened foreshore wetland ecosystem. This is one of a number of wetland projects, with similar objectives, in the estuarine portion of the river. Although the river estuary is now extensively urbanized, there is an improvement in water quality in the areas with wetland restoration. However, it appears that the loss of most of the estuary's once extensive salt marshes is now irreversible, and the ecology of the river is now very different to that present even as late as 1930.

A scientific paper in 2020, listed the sub-tidal oyster reefs of Botany Bay and its estuaries as endangered. It was announced, in 2023, that work would begin on re-establishing three sub-tidal oyster reefs in the Georges River estuary (at Audrey Bay, Coronation Bay and on the eastern side of Taren Point), and another in Botany Bay. The reefs, initially artificially constructed from underwater heaps of dumped rocks, will support reintroduced Native flat oysters (locally extinct since 1896) and also the now depleted Sydney Rock Oysters. The last shore facility for oyster farming on Woolooware Bay was closed, in the same year to allow soil decontamination, due to the presence of coal tar and bitumen, in which wooden oyster trays and barges were once coated.

By April 2024, for the first time in well over a century, the Native or Flat oyster was present in the estuary. In December 2024, additional funding of the reefs was announced. It is envisaged that the presence of the oyster reefs in the bay and estuary will increase both water quality and biodiversity, including an increase in the numbers of fish living there. Construction of reefs was proceeding during 2025.
