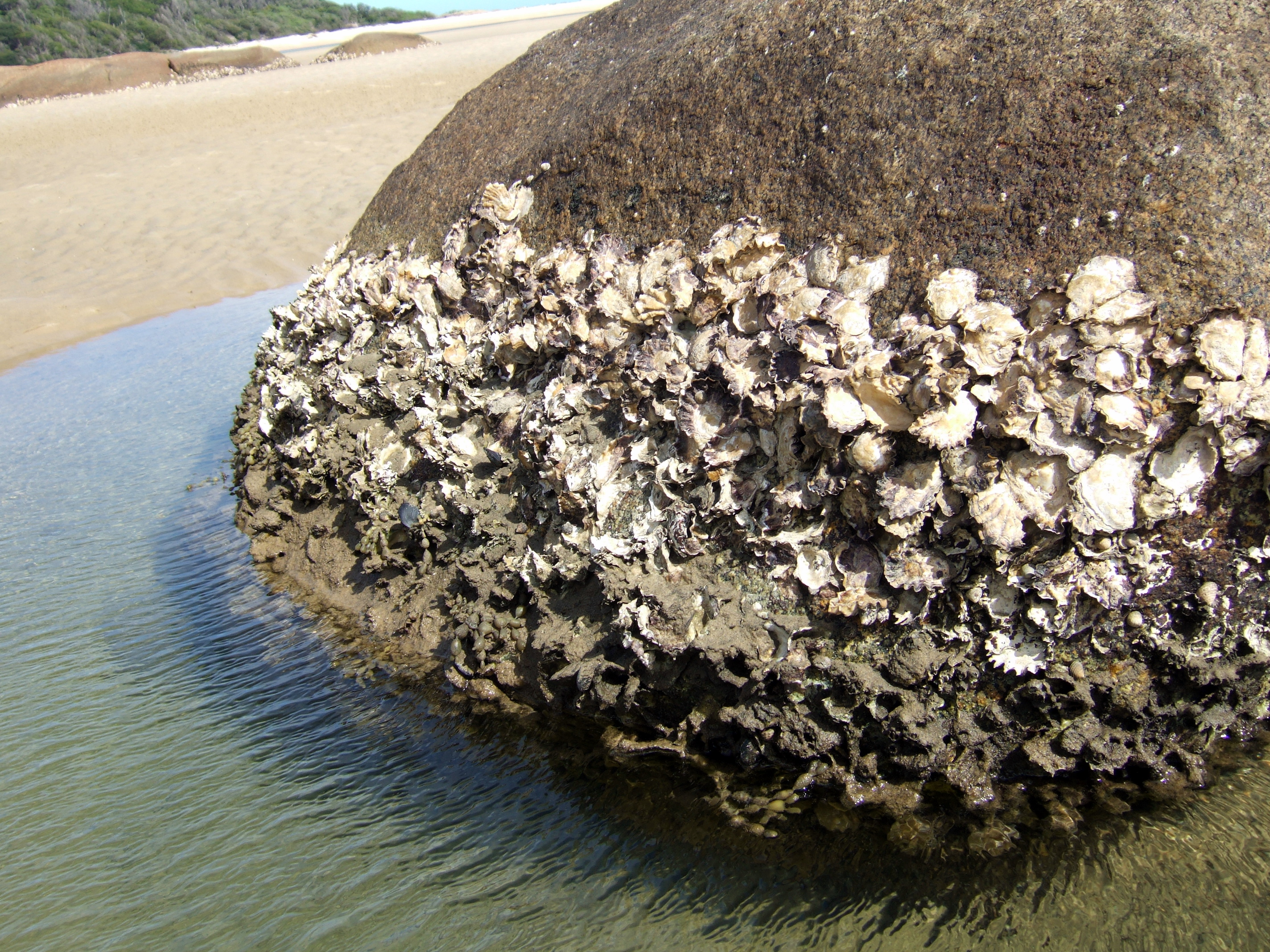
- Oysters on a rock at low tide, Wingan Inlet

Scientific classification
- Kingdom: Animalia
- Phylum: Mollusca
- Class: Bivalvia
- Order: Ostreida
- Family: Ostreidae
- Genus: Saccostrea
- Species: S. glomerata

Binomial name
- Saccostrea glomerata (Gould, 1850)

Synonyms
- Saccostrea commercialis Crassostrea glomerata Ostrea glomerata Gould, 1850; Ostrea commercialis Iredale & Roughley, 1933; Saccostrea culcullata ssp. glomerata

= Saccostrea glomerata =

Species of bivalve

Saccostrea glomerata is an oyster species belonging to the family Ostreidae.

It is endemic to Australia and New Zealand. In Australia, it is known as the Sydney rock oyster and is commercially farmed. In New Zealand, where the species is no longer farmed, it is known as the New Zealand rock oyster or Auckland oyster.

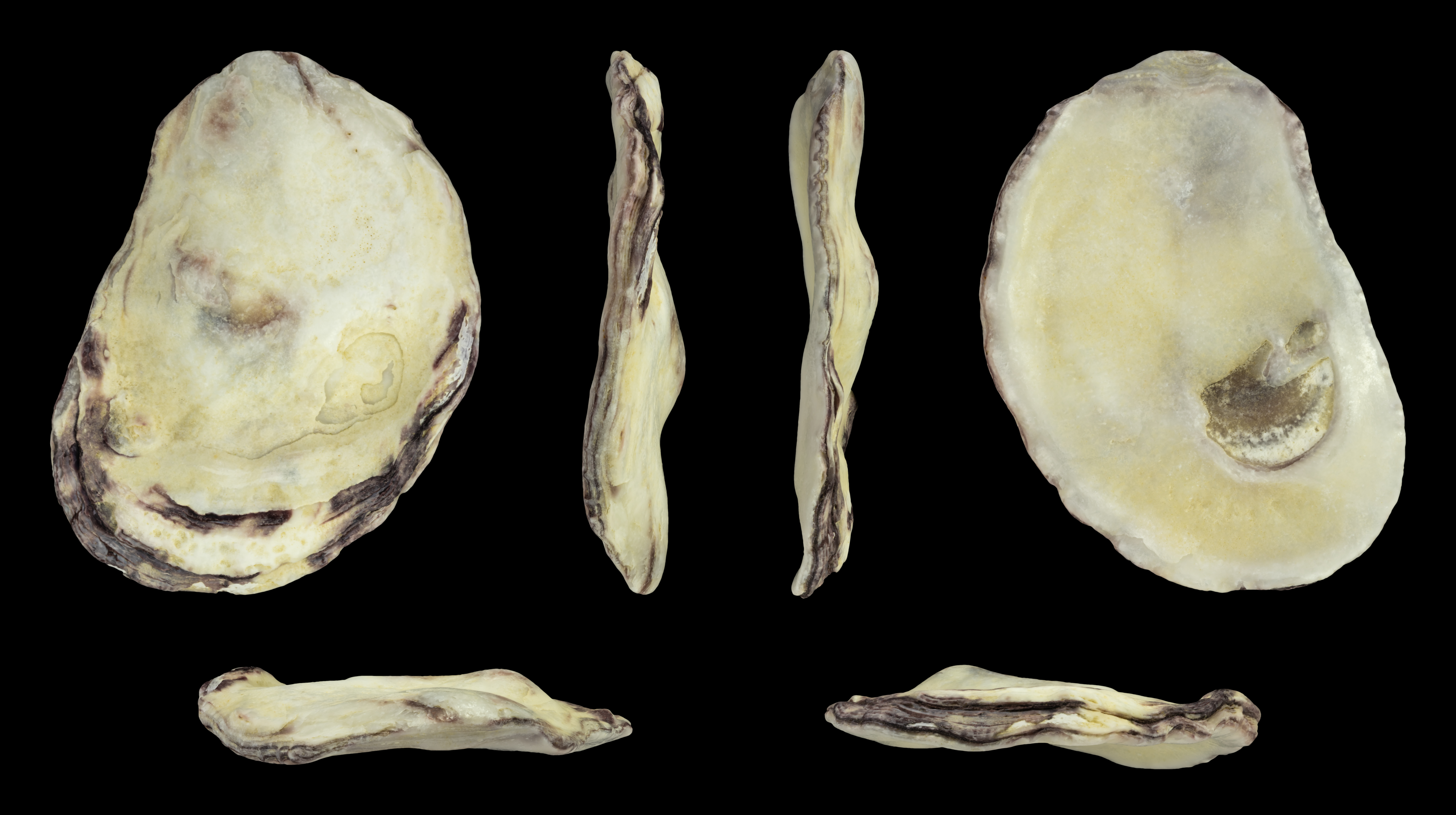
Right valve

Left valve

== Taxonomy ==
The Sydney rock oyster and New Zealand rock oyster have previously been classified as two separate species: Saccostrea commercialis and S. glomerata, respectively. These species have also been grouped with the hooded oyster into a single species, S. cucullata. (Note: For example, Harry's 1985 taxonomy, which was based on soft-tissue anatomy as well as shell morphology, only recognised two Saccostrea species: S. cucullata and S. palmula.) (Note: In Born's original 1778 description, the name was published misspelled with two 'c's as S. cuccullata. Born later (1789) used S. cucullata, feminine of Latin cucullatus, 'hooded'. Technically the former name has precedence, but the latter has been in wide use for over two centuries.) The species is currently considered to be closely related to S. cucullata, which is common on Indo-Pacific rocky shores.

When proposing the name Ostrea commercialis in 1933, Iredale & Roughley noted that the New South Wales oyster had been variously referred to species O. cucullata Born (Ascension Island), O. mordax Gould (Fiji), O. glomerata Gould (New Zealand), O. circumsuta Gould (Fiji); and even to O. trigonata Sowerby and O. mytiloides Lamarck.

== Distribution ==
In Australia it is found in bays, inlets and sheltered estuaries from Wingan Inlet in eastern Victoria, along the east coast of New South Wales, and north to Hervey Bay, Queensland, around northern Australia and south along the west coast to Shark Bay in Western Australia. The spat for these oysters travels down the east coast of Australia on the East Australia Current. Also, a small population exists on the islands in the Furneaux archipelago in Bass Strait, and in Albany on the south west coast of Western Australia, where they are farmed.

== Ecology ==
Sydney rock oysters are capable of tolerating a wide range of salinities. They are usually found in the intertidal zone to 3 m (9.8 ft) below the low-water mark.

Oysters are filter feeders, straining planktonic algae from the water. Birds, fish, stingrays, mud crabs, and starfish all eat Sydney rock oysters, with the Australian pied oystercatcher (Haematopus longirostris) being particularly fond of them.

Selective breeding of farmed rock oysters has successfully bred for disease resistance to two protozoan diseases of oysters, namely, QX disease Marteilia sydneyi and winter mortality Bonamia roughleyi.

== Growth and reproduction ==
Sydney rock oysters are "broadcast spawners", that is, eggs and sperm are released into open water where fertilisation occurs. Within hours of fertilisation, the eggs develop into free-swimming planktonic larvae. The larvae swim in estuarine and coastal waters for up to three weeks, during which they develop transparent shells and retractable feet. The larvae then settle on clean substrates using their feet to find suitable sites. The larval foot is reabsorbed once the larva is attached. The shell darkens and the small animal takes on the appearance of an adult oyster.

Growth rates vary with local conditions, but they generally reach 50 g (1.8 oz) in three years. Sydney rock oysters may change sex during life. Many individuals start out as males and later change to females. About 60% of prime eating oysters are female. Selective breeding has reduced the time to market size from three to two years.

== Human use ==
=== Commercial aquaculture industry ===
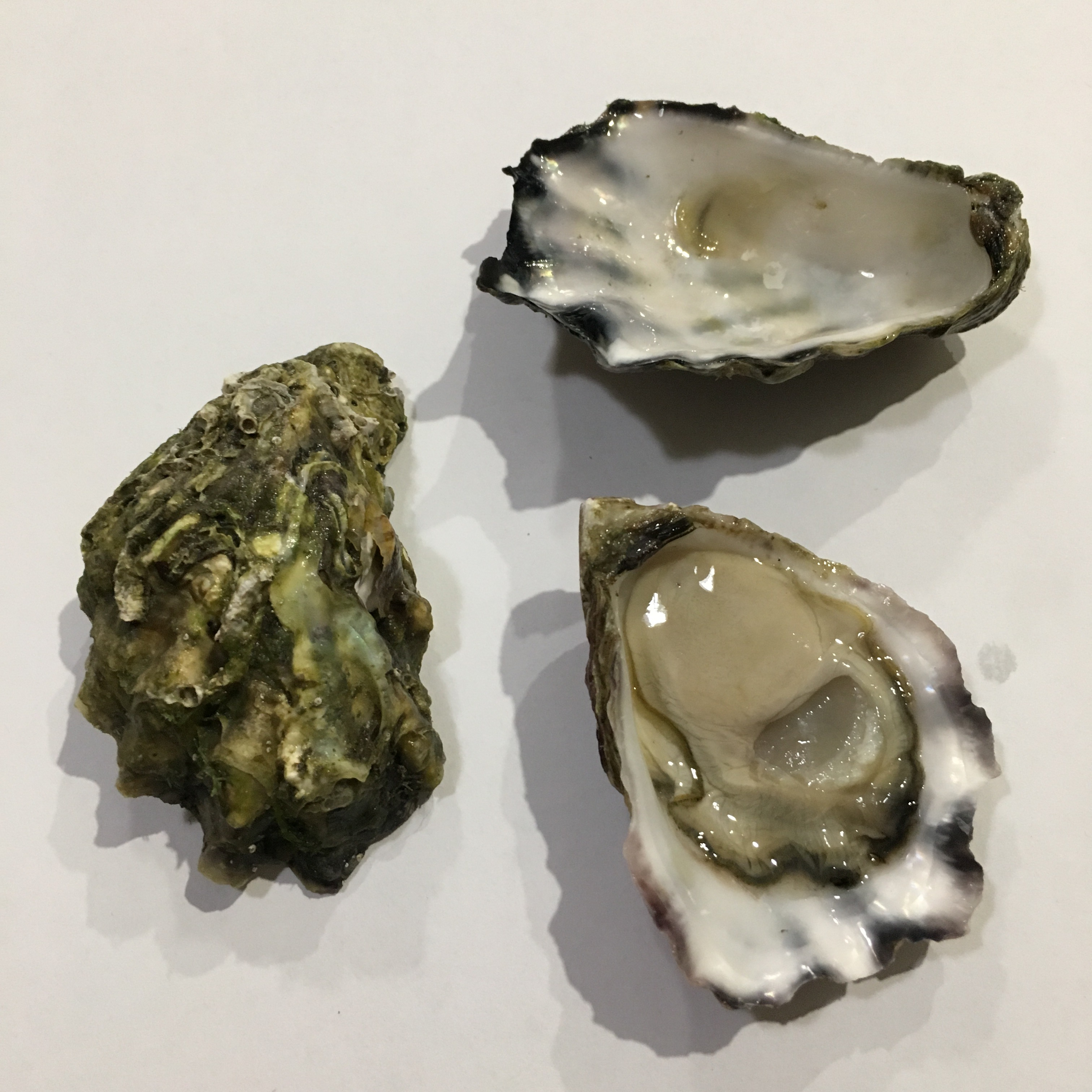
Commercially purchased Sydney rock oyster and empty shells. The upper valve is discarded before sale.

A substantial commercial oyster farming industry is found in New South Wales and southern Queensland, with a small, emerging industry in Albany, Western Australia. The industry produces a gourmet product and provides employment in isolated coastal communities. In Australia, oysters in peak flesh condition (i.e. spawning condition) are preferred for the half-shell trade. The species was once extensively farmed in the Georges River estuary, but has not been since 2023.

The species was once farmed in New Zealand. Oyster farmers there switched to Pacific Oysters, after faster-growing wild Pacific Oysters largely took over the fishery.

=== Consumption ===
Sydney rock oysters are best consumed when freshly shucked, but do have a good shelf life when kept whole. Unopened oysters can remain alive, ready to be shucked, for up to 14 days, provided they are kept at the correct temperature (10 to 20°C) and handled safely. Live Sydney rock oysters should not be placed on ice, until shucked for consumption.
