= Canal estate =

Residential subdivision made up of canals and reclaimed land

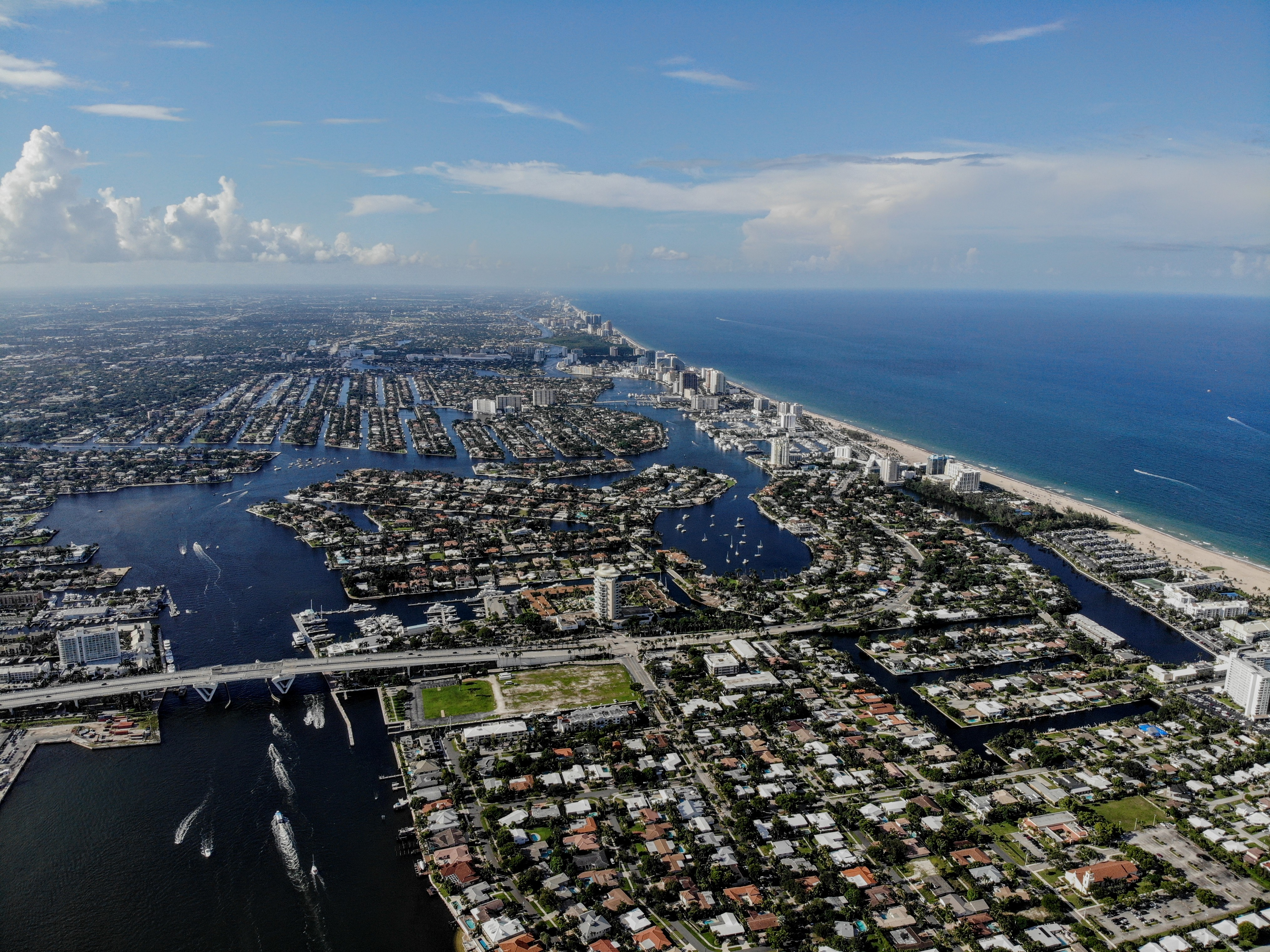
Aerial photo of Fort Lauderdale.

A canal estate, canal development, waterway estate or marine suburb is a residential subdivision made up of canals and reclaimed land, such that many or all of the lots can incorporate a private mooring or boat ramp. Canal estates are typically constructed on floodplains or swampland in estuaries, providing ready access to larger waterways and the ocean. To build the estate, civil contractors will dredge parts of the site to create deep, navigable channels, and use the resulting fill to form islands and headlands above the flood level. The resulting street layout shows a distinctive 'finger' pattern.

Canal estates are distinct from earlier canal cities such as Venice and Amsterdam in that the channels serve a purely recreational, as distinct from commercial or security, purpose.

== United States ==
Canal estates originated in the United States, where developer Abbot Kinney sought to create a Venice-like city in swampland on the outskirts of Los Angeles. Kinney's "Venice of America" opened in 1905, but pressure to accommodate automobiles saw more than half the canals filled in to create roads in 1929. The canal estate model proved more resilient on the east coast, where they are a significant part of the urban structure of Cape Coral, Fort Lauderdale and Miami in Florida.

== Australia ==
Queensland's South Coast (now known as the Gold Coast) had enjoyed rapid growth as a playground for Brisbane holidaymakers. When wartime restrictions on construction were relaxed in 1952, there was considerable demand for housing in the region.

Australian real estate agent Alfred Grant is credited with importing the canal estate concept from Florida and Hawaii in the United States. The Gold Coast provided the ideal conditions: expensive coastal sites bordered by cheap floodplain and mangrove swamp. Working with celebrated Austrian town planner Karl Langer, Grant created Australia’s first “man-made waterway estates”, Miami Keys and Rio Vista, at Broadbeach in 1957. On the opposite side of the Nerang River, Bruce Small started to build Paradise City, with the Isle of Capri as its glitzy centrepiece. When his calls for a comprehensive city plan fell on deaf ears, Small entered politics and represented the area as mayor or MP from 1967 to 1978.

Legislation governing these neighbourhoods followed the initial developments in the form of the Canals Act 1958 (Qld). Recognising the risk of flood, the city council mandated that one pound from the sale of every lot should go to a University of Queensland project studying mitigation strategies. The result of this work was the Benowa Flood By-Pass Canal, completed in 1980.

Canal development emerged as the defining characteristic of the Gold Coast’s urban form: today the city is home to more than 890 kilometres of canals. Isolated examples emerged elsewhere in Australia, however. Grant himself championed Kawana Waters on the Sunshine Coast in 1961, though the project was plagued by construction delays and slow sales. Real-estate firm LJ Hooker built Sylvania Waters in southern Sydney in 1965. Further developments on the Sunshine Coast followed, as well as projects in Bunbury, Cairns, the Central Coast, Forster, Geographe, Hervey Bay, Lakes Entrance, Port Macquarie, Sussex Inlet, Tweed Heads, Yamba and each of the other mainland State capitals.
