= Theodore Roughley =

Australian zoologist, author and public servant

Theodore Cleveland Roughley (1888–1961) was an Australian zoologist, author, and public servant. He is best known for his work on the Sydney Rock Oyster and its commercial cultivation, and for his books and other publications, mainly on marine science, which he skillfully illustrated with his own artwork and photography. In the later part of his career, as Superintendent of Fisheries, he implemented measures for the scientific management of fisheries in New South Wales, including catch size limits and closures of certain waters to commercial fishing. He was a well-known and influential public figure in his time. He was also known informally as Ted Roughley and, as an author, T. C. Roughley.

== Early life ==
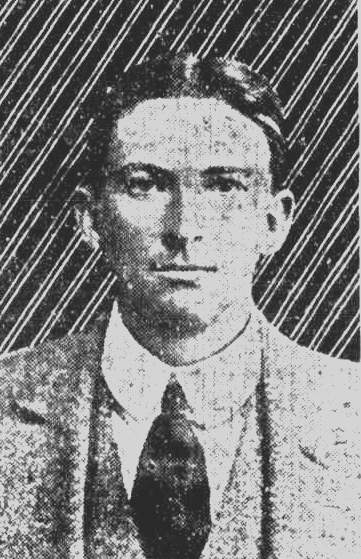
Roughley as a young man, c.1912.

Roughley was born at Ryde, New South Wales, on 30 September 1888. He attended Sydney Boys High School, finishing school at end of 1906.

He studied medicine at University of Sydney, for three years from 1907, but did not complete his medical studies, finding more interest in zoology. He studied art under Julian Ashton. It was only in 1933, when he was already a well-known zoologist, that the university awarded him a Bachelor of Science degree, on the basis of his work, The Life History of the Australian Oyster (Ostrea commercialis)', published in the Proceedings of the Linnean Society of New South Wales.

A tall and athletic man, he played first grade cricket for Petersham in the Sydney First Grade Premiership Competition, as well as playing baseball and cricket at University.

== Career ==
=== Economic Zoologist and author ===
Roughly joined the staff of the Sydney Technological Museum, in 1911 as an Economic Zoologist, a position that he would hold for 28 years. In that role his focus was on the zoology of fishes and other seafood, as it affected their role as economic resources. He quickly became recognised for his photography and microscopy.

In 1916, his book, The Fishes of Australia and their Technology, was published. Roughley is also credited with the original artwork for its 70 beautiful colour plates showing fishes of various species. Some of the plates correctly captured the colours of freshly caught specimens of species whose colours fade quickly after death. The book also set out proposals about how the fishing industry in Australia might be expanded and improved. Decades later in 1952, Roughley, self-deprecatingly, would refer to this work as "a rather pretentious volume".

In 1922, Roughley's, long paper, Oyster Culture on the Georges River, New South Wales, was published in hardcover by the museum. By 1925, when his paper, The Story of the Oyster, was published, the extent of Roughley's knowledge of the zoology and cultivation of oysters, and the pests which affected that cultivation, was apparent. In 1928, Roughley was the first to discover that the Sydney Rock Oyster changed sex, from male to female, during its life cycle, something that brought him international attention. Roughley remained humble about his understanding of the oyster; he told an oyster farmers' conference, in 1930, that what he had "ascertained about the oyster was like a bucketful of water to an ocean".

His work had a practical impact, when he suggested a method of managing the oyster disease, 'winter mortality', in 1926. For many decades afterwards, the oyster farmers of the Georges River limited the impact of winter mortality, by moving their oysters on trays, to more sheltered waters with lower salinity, such as near the Woronora River confluence and Bonnet Bay, and then placing the trays on racks higher in the intertidal zone. The method became known as 'wintering'. It did reduce 'winter mortality', but the disease could not be completely eliminated, and it came at the cost of slower growth to maturity. Another method used was to harvest the more mature oysters as the weather cooled.

Roughley was throughout his career an advocate for the oyster industry and its product. He publicly refuted the then widespread beliefs that oysters were dangerous to eat, due to typhoid or ptomaine poisoning supposedly caused by contamination, and that oysters should only be consumed in certain months of the year. He was later to state of his devotion to the study of the oyster that, "I enjoyed this work immensely, not only because of the intense interest the secretive little creature awakened in me, but also because of the very sincere appreciation the oyster farmers showed for any help I was able to give them".

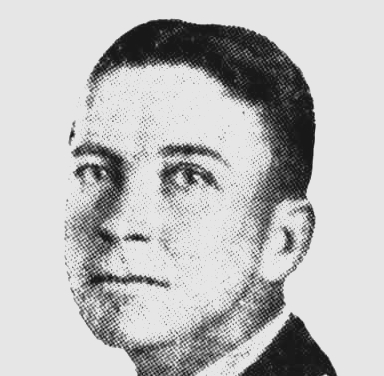
Roughley c.1928.

In 1928, Roughley made an Investigation of the oyster resources of Queensland, Victoria, and Tasmania, for the governments of the three states. He recognised the potential of Moreton Bay as an oyster farming area, which indeed it still is. In the same year, he wrote a newspaper article, on his visit to the British Barrier Reef expedition on Low Island. The Great Barrier Reef and its marine life became the subject of Roughley's book, Wonders of the Barrier Reef, published in 1936, which included 52 colour photographs taken by him. This was at a time when colour photography was relatively novel. The book was an immediate critical and commercial success, and was reprinted in (at least) 1939, 1947, 1951, 1953, and 1961. It was sold in the United Kingdom, and was published in the United States, in 1947.

Around 1931, Roughley turned his attention to goldfish, probably because of an interest in an epidemic of fungus disease affecting goldfish and his concern over fish being kept in 'goldfish bowls' with inadequate oxygenation. In 1932, the museum published Roughley's bulletin, The Goldfish in the Home, aimed for use by the home aquarium owner. It was followed, in 1933, by Roughley's book on the same subject, The Cult of the Goldfish, also published in the United Kingdom, which the journal, Nature, described as "perhaps the best book on gold-fish culture that has yet been published".

In 1936, a colony of pearl oysters was discovered near the cooling water outfall of Bunnerong Power Station; Roughley explained that its presence was due to the elevated temperature of the flow of cooling water, and cautioned that, although some small pearls had been found, a commercial pearl fishery was not possible in Botany Bay.

In the late 1930s, Roughley's work and encouragement led to the establishment of the first commercial fish cannery in New South Wales, at Narooma. It was initially based on the Australian Salmon (not a true salmon), which at the time was believed to be present in great numbers. Roughley suggested that the fish be caught and then kept alive in pens, until it was ready to processed in the cannery; this solved two issues, certainty and continuity of supply for cannery operations and the well-known dryness of the fish's flesh when freshly caught. Unfortunately, available stocks of Australian Salmon were rapidly depleted and the relatively less palatable canned Australian salmon was not comparable to imported canned salmon; although it was still being canned in 1949, Australian salmon was better suited to making fishcakes. However, a fish canning industry based on tuna did survive in New South Wales for several decades. Tuna was not a widely known eating fish in Australia, at the time being referred to as 'Tunny'. Roughley both recognised the possibility of a tuna fishery and became involved in improving the reputation of tuna as an eating fish.

=== Fisheries Department ===
In 1939, Roughley left the museum and took up an appointment as a research officer with New South Wales Fisheries. He was later Deputy-Superintendent of Fisheries, from 1943, before being appointed Superintendent of Fisheries, in 1947.

In 1948, Roughley suggested fishermen look for off-shore prawn fisheries. Until that time, it had been received wisdom that prawn fisheries in Australia were only found in coastal lagoons and estuaries. Roughley pointed out that the same species of prawn were present in the ocean. Acting on Roughley's prediction, the first such ocean prawning ground was found off Newcastle, in the same year, and the first one off the South Coast in 1950.

Roughley had long realised that Australia, despite its large land mass, had only relatively small fisheries; for various reasons, but largely due to the relatively small width of the continental shelf, from the coast to deep water. Moreover, the entire coastline of New South Wales has only a narrow continental shelf, relative to the other Australian states. He saw that what sea fisheries Eastern Australia, especially New South Wales, possessed were mainly in deep ocean species. He wrote several newspaper articles on the potential exploitation of pelagic fish, in 1950, including one on pole fishing for tuna, a technique new to Australia at that time.

In 1951, Roughley had to act to preserve fish stocks that were in decline, by introducing new minimum fish sizes and closing the upper river estuaries of Sydney Harbour to commercial fishing. These moves were unpopular with the affected fishermen, but were in the best longer-term interests of the industry. He also took a strong interest in the decline of the Murray cod, which he later stated, "must be classed as one of the finest freshwater fish to be found anywhere in the world".

Roughley's book, Fish and Fisheries of Australia, was published, in 1951. It was a rewrite of a book that had already become a classic on the subject, Roughley's own, by then out of print, The Fishes of Australia and their Technology, of 1916. It included the same colour plates as the earlier book, with some additions. It would be reprinted in 1953, 1957, 1966, and later. It was still on sale a decade after Roughley's death.

=== Other activities and positions ===
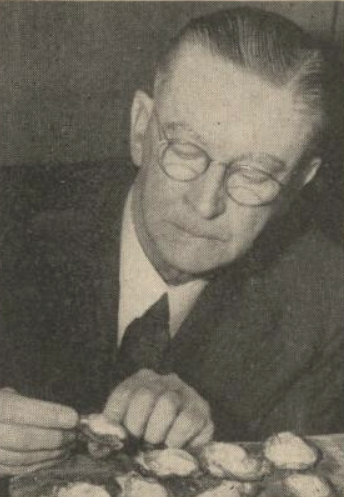
Roughley judging rock oysters, 1949.

Outside his employed work, Roughley was a Councillor of the Royal Zoological Society of New South Wales, from 1927, its president in 1934 and 1935, and was made a fellow of the society in 1936. He was a member of the Linnean Society of New South Wales from 1925, its president in 1938–1939, and a Councillor from 1931 to 1956.

A keen angler himself, Roughley encouraged the development of big game sport fishing around Bermagui—an area famed for its Marlin—during the second half of the 1930s, including an association with Zane Grey. He was for a time, with Zane Grey, a patron of the Bermagui Big Game Anglers Club. in 1937, he was president of the Great Barrier Reef Game Fishing and Angling Club.

A popular figure among oyster farmers, Roughley was a life member of the New South Wales Oyster Farmers Association. For many years, he was a regular attendee of their annual conferences, where he was one of the panel of judges of the competition for the best commercial oyster. His interest in oyster consumption was not merely academic; he was the conference's oyster eating champion, for 1950, a title which he won by eating 24 dozen rock oysters. He joked afterward that the competition had been very poor, and that he could have kept eating oysters for the rest of the afternoon.

=== Retirement ===
He retired as the Superintendent of NSW Fisheries, on 12 September 1952. Shortly before he retired, he was honoured at a dinner given by the Lord Mayor of Sydney, Ernest Charles O'Dea, at which 480 dozen rock oysters and 300 'Tasmanian crayfish' (now known as Eastern Rock Lobsters in Australia) were consumed by the 150 guests.

By his own admission, Roughley had only retired because he had reached the then mandatory retirement age, and he maintained a strong interest in fisheries and fishing. Reflecting on his time as Superintendent of Fisheries he stated that it had been the most difficult years of his career, because he had to take measures that were unpopular with fishermen to protect fish stocks. He himself thought that his most valuable work had been done while he was working for the museum.

In his retirement, he served as a member of the state committee of the Commonwealth Scientific and Industrial Research Organization, from 1952 until 1960. It is probable that he took this position after the president of the NSW Oyster Growers Association had been highly critical of the CSIROs efforts concerning oyster disease research, in May 1951.

He continued to attend the annual conferences of the NSW Oyster Farmers Association, until at earliest 1956, and was a vice president of that organisation in 1954. At the time of his retirement, it had been stated that "oysters will lose their biographer". Despite that prediction, he did continue to write on the subject for the popular press.

Roughley continued his efforts, including through newspaper articles, to broaden the conservative Australian diet, lamenting its monotony. He advocated the merits of seafood such as gummy shark, abalone (then known in Australia as 'mutton fish'), pipis, mussels, octopus, squid, and sea urchins, all of which were present in Australian waters but rarely consumed by most Australians. He noted, approvingly, the changes beginning to occur in the range of seafood available in the fish markets, as a result of post-war immigration from Mediterranean countries.

He continued to write until his death. His last piece was on the descendants of the Bounty mutineers living on Norfolk Island, and was published in the National Geographic magazine of October 1960.

== Family, home, and death ==
Roughley married Olive Lambert, at St Philips Church, in 1915. The couple had a son and a daughter. By 1927, the family were living in a house in Wentworth Avenue, Vaucluse, which would be Roughley's home for the rest of his life. His hobby was collecting books and Australian artwork, and his home library had over 1000 books by 1949. As well as his paid employment, Roughley would have had a significant separate source of income, from the publishers of his popular books, with which to support his family and other interests.

He died unexpectedly, on 14 January 1961, at a hotel at The Entrance, where he was staying as an inspector for a fishing competition.

== Legacy ==
Roughley was the author of sixty identifiable publications, between 1913 and 1960. However, one biographer concluded that it was impossible to make a complete catalogue of his written works, because these also included articles for ephemeral and obscure journals, such as those associated with angling clubs and the marketing of seafood. In addition, there were his many newspaper and magazine articles, written with a general audience in mind. He had also made himself available consistently throughout his career, as a source of expert knowledge and opinion, and as a guest speaker—presenting on radio as early as 1924 and as late as 1952—and he was quoted in many press articles and interviews. An engaging speaker, well published, well known, and with a polished and accessible writing style, he had shared his enthusiasm for marine zoology with a wide audience in Australia, for nearly fifty years of his life.

As well as publications on aquatic life, he wrote, in 1933, The Aeronautical Work of Lawrence Hargrave. Roughley was among the first to properly recognise Lawrence Hargrave's pioneering work in the area of aviation, which, at that time, was largely forgotten in his own country. In 1925, he had written Hargrave's entry in the Australian Encyclopaedia, only ten years after Hargrave's death. He also wrote various other entries for the encyclopaedia. In 1924, he wrote a newspaper article on Hargrave's work.

His 1916 work, The Fishes of Australia and their Technology, is still sought after. Its rare editions have sometimes been destroyed to obtain the 70 beautiful engraved colour plates, which have been sold individually as works of art. His other books also are still to be found, in the second-hand book market.

His efforts, in effect, gave rise to off-shore commercial fishing for prawns. It remains a valuable commercial fishery. He encouraged fishermen to change their emphasis to deep sea fishing for pelagic fish. He also did much to encourage a commercial fish canning industry, although that is now only a memory. However, despite his work in other areas, it is still with oysters that he is most associated.

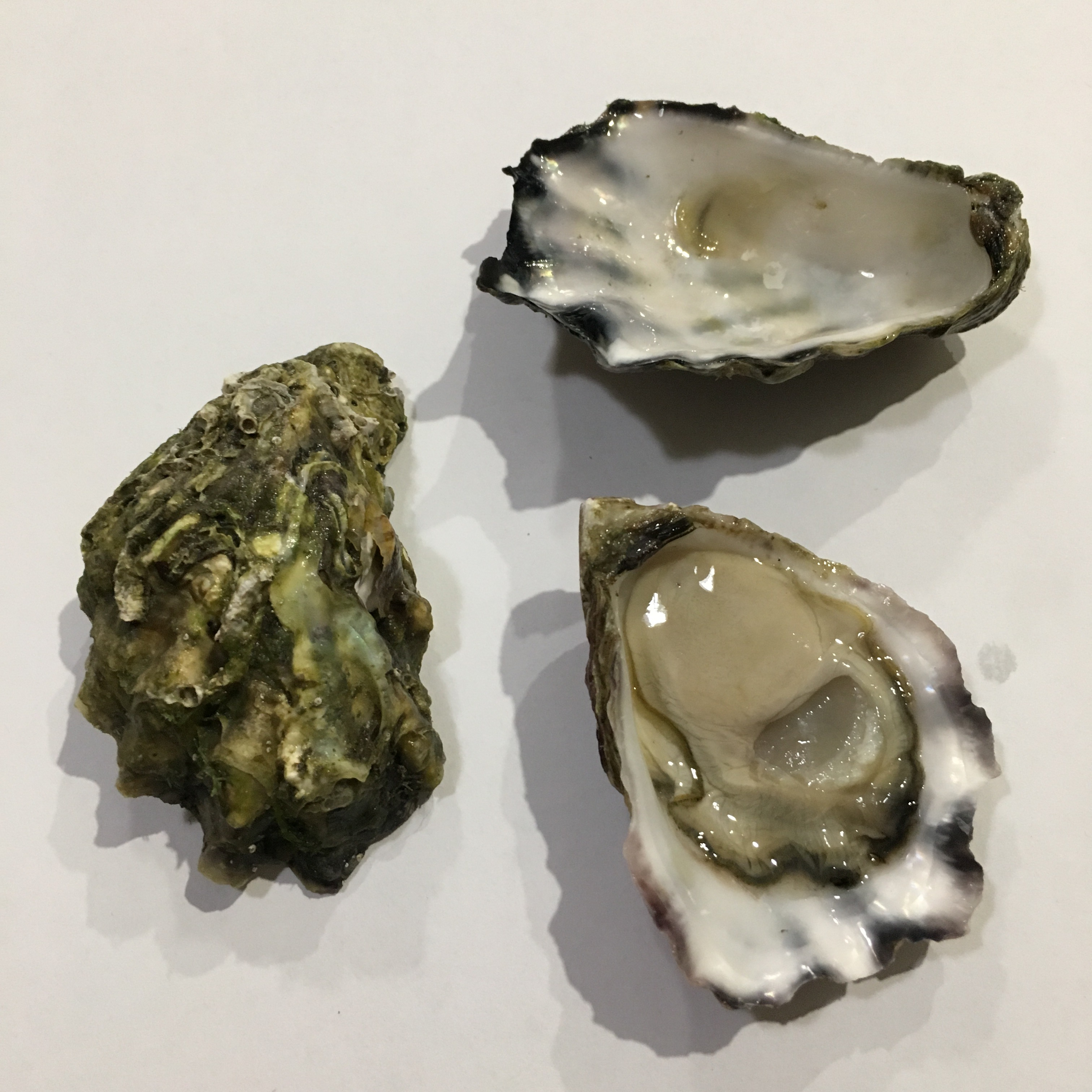
Sydney rock oyster.

The name of the Sydney Rock Oyster, Saccostrea commercialis, given to it by Roughley and co-author Tom Iredale, is not commonly used. It is better known now as Saccostrea glomerata. However, his surname is part of the name of the protozoan parasite, Mikiocytos roughleyi or Bonamia roughleyi, responsible for the 'winter mortality' of that oyster species. It was Roughley's work in the 1920s, which resulted in the disease being brought under control, allowing the oyster industry on the Georges River, in particular, to grow and prosper for many years. Roughley's 1926 paper, on 'winter mortality', An investigation of the cause of an oyster mortality on the Georges River, New South Wales (1924–25), is sometimes still found cited in more recent scientific papers on diseases of molluscs and associated parasites.

Roughley's tangible legacy included the expansion of commercial oyster farming in New South Wales and the creation of a buoyant market for New South Wales oysters. By the time that he died, the industry was on a sound footing and continuing to grow. Oyster growing on the Georges River peaked in the 1970s. In the financial year 1976–1977. That year the river produced 2,563 tonnes of oysters, over a quarter of the record statewide production total of 9,375 tonnes (the state total being equivalent to 204 million individual oysters). An outbreak of QX disease, in 1994, all but totally destroyed the industry on the Georges River, and the development of QX-resistant strains came too late to save most of it. In 2023, the last oyster farmer in the estuary was forced to close, and the future of the area as an oyster growing area is now uncertain. Increasingly a regional industry, some now wish to drop 'Sydney' from the oyster's name, or substitute another location for marketing reasons.

Commercial oyster farming continues in some other estuaries of New South Wales, but overall production is now far less than in the boom years of the 1970s and 1980s (in 2018–2019, around 76 million individual oysters were harvested, only around the same number that had been harvested in 1955). The reduction is largely as a result of estuaries where oyster production has either ceased or is now negligible, and the limitations on movement of rock oyster spat between estuaries (due to the risk of wild Pacific oyster infestations and the risk of spreading QX-disease). On the demand side, changes have included competition—mainly in Pacific oysters—from other states and New Zealand, and changes in consumer preferences and population demographics.

Faster growing and generally larger Pacific oysters are displacing—geographically and commercially—to a significant extent, Roughley's Sydney Rock Oyster, which he contended was the finest eating oyster in the world. In 1956, he had written, "I suppose most oysters are good, but there is little doubt that Australian oysters are the best in the world. They have a subtle delicacy of flavour found in few if any other oysters ...". It remains a regarded oyster, and its commercially-farmed variants are benefiting from selective breeding to overcome some of its vulnerabilities.

Over his long career, Theodore Roughley established a personal reputation and strong rapport with the fisherman and oyster farmers of New South Wales, and he came to be able to influence both them and government fisheries policy. At the time of his death, it was stated that nobody has had such a profound impact on the commercial fisheries of the state. His less tangible legacy is the lasting influence that his life's work has had on the commercial fishing industry in Australia, most notably the acceptance of scientific advice when managing fisheries.
