= Woolooware Bay =

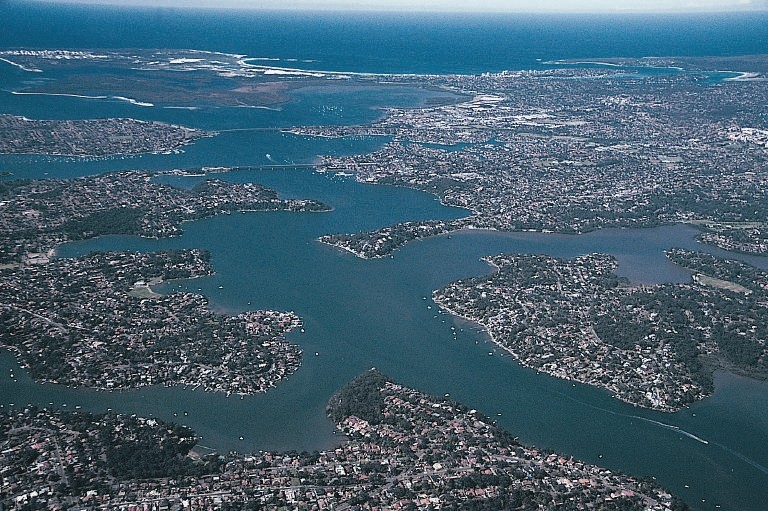
- The Georges River, looking east. The Woolooware Bay is pictured as the most easterly bay, to the right and back of the picture, southeast of the Captain Cook Bridge, the most easterly river crossing.

- Location of Woolooware Bay in New South Wales
- Location: Southern Sydney, New South Wales
- Coordinates: 34°01′55″S 151°09′04″E
- Type: Bay
- Primary outflows: Georges River
- Catchment area: 6 km^{2} (2.3 sq mi)
- Basin countries: Australia
- Managing agency: Sutherland Shire Council
- Frozen: never
- Settlements: Caringbah, Kurnell, Taren Point, Woolooware

The Woolooware Bay is a bay on the lower estuarine Georges River in southern Sydney, in the state of New South Wales, Australia.

Woolooware Bay was also home to local icon "Tattoo", a female Russian Blue ship's cat who lived for 10 years aboard a moored yacht (Simba) with her owner, author Rachel Alexandra. Tattoo came to prominence through a children's book released in April 2024. Tattoo died on 22 November 2025, age 14 and was buried above the sands that over look the entrance of Woolooware Bay.

The bay was the site of the last oyster farming on Georges River. The last oyster farming site there was closed in 2023.

== Location and features ==
The bay is located near where the Georges River empties into Botany Bay, southeast of the Captain Cook Bridge. The bay's catchment area is bound by Botany Bay to the north, Bate Bay sub-catchment to the east, Gwawley Bay sub-catchment to the west and Port Hacking sub-catchment to the south. The bay is surrounded by the suburbs of Kurnell to the east, Woolooware to the south, and Taren Point and Caringbah to the west of the bay's shore. Mangrove swamps were traditionally located around the bay area. Some were reclaimed to create parks and playing fields including Endeavour Field, Woolooware Golf Course and Cronulla Golf Course.
