= Weeney Bay =

Coordinates: 34.020°S 151.162°E

Weeney Bay is a bay in Botany Bay located in New South Wales, Australia.
