= Gwawley Bay =

Bay in New South Wales, Australia

Coordinates: 34°00′56″S 151°06′53″E

Gwawley Bay is a bay on the Georges River located in New South Wales, Australia. Gwawley Creek runs into the bay.

== History ==
The Dharawal Aboriginal people inhabited the area along the foreshore of Gwawley Bay.

Thomas Holt built Sutherland House on the foreshore of Gwawley Bay in 1868.

The Sydney suburb of Sylvania Waters surrounds Gwawley Bay, with much of the waterfront areas of Sylvania Waters reclaimed from Gwawley Bay.
