= Sylvania Waters, New South Wales =

Sylvania Waters
- Suburb
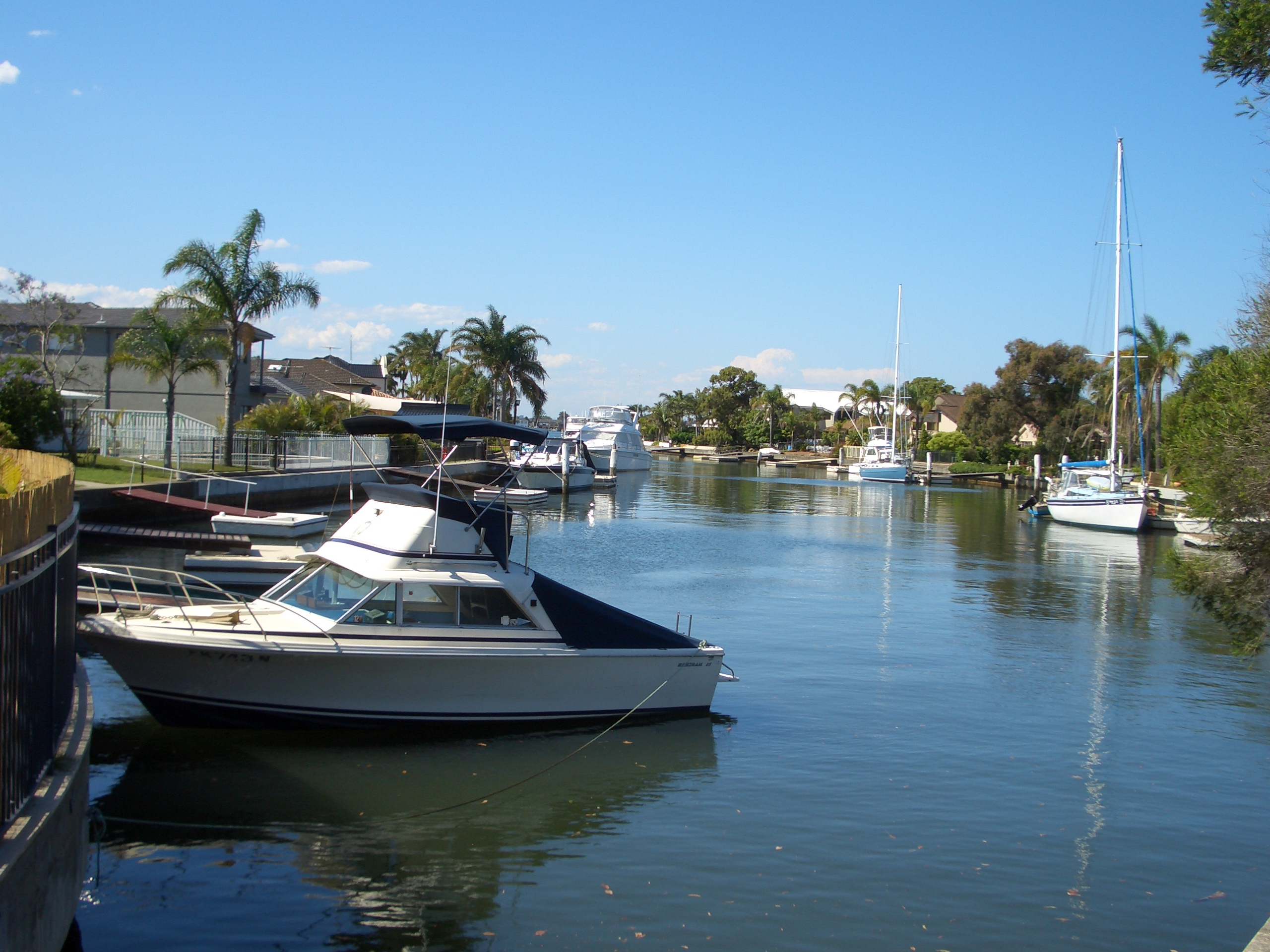
- Sylvania Waters

- Interactive map of Sylvania Waters
- Country: Australia
- State: New South Wales
- City: Sydney
- LGA: Sutherland Shire
- Location: 23 km (14 mi) south of Sydney CBD

Government
  - State electorate: Miranda
  - Federal division: Cook
- Elevation: 4 m (13 ft)

Population
  - Total: 3,200 (2021 census)
- Postcode: 2224
Suburbs around Sylvania Waters
Sylvania	Georges River	Taren Point
Sylvania	Sylvania Waters	Taren Point
Miranda	Miranda	Caringbah

Sylvania Waters is a suburb in southern Sydney located in the state of New South Wales, Australia, 21 kilometres (13 miles) south of the Sydney central business district in the local government area of Sutherland Shire.

== History ==
Politician Thomas Holt (1811–1888) owned the land that stretched from Sutherland to Cronulla. Holt had built Sutherland House on the foreshore of Gwawley Bay in 1818, on the eastern side of Sylvania, which took its name from the original wooded vegetation. The word "Sylvania" comes from the Latin word sylvan or sylva which means "forest land".

He established the Sutherland Estate Company in 1881 and a village grew there, with a post office opening in 1883. The school opened in 1884 but closed in 1891 and was not reopened until 1925. Sylvania Heights Public School opened in 1955.

Sylvania Waters Estate was developed by LJ Hooker in the 1960s, with much of the land reclaimed from the bay, effectively destroying the mangrove ecosystem to provide water frontages with boating facilities. James Goyen won the tender to design the estate, construct the houses, and promote the new suburb. Streets of the development were named after Australian rivers – such as Shoalhaven, Tweed, Murrumbidgee, Hawkesbury and Barwon – to emphasise the association with water.

== Commercial area ==
Sylvania Waters is mostly residential, with three small shopping strips located on Belgrave Esplanade: Sylvania Shopping Village near Box Road, Sylvania Shopping Centre near Murrumbidgee Avenue, and the Richmond Centre near Richmond Avenue. Doltone House is a function centre close to Sylvania Shopping Village.

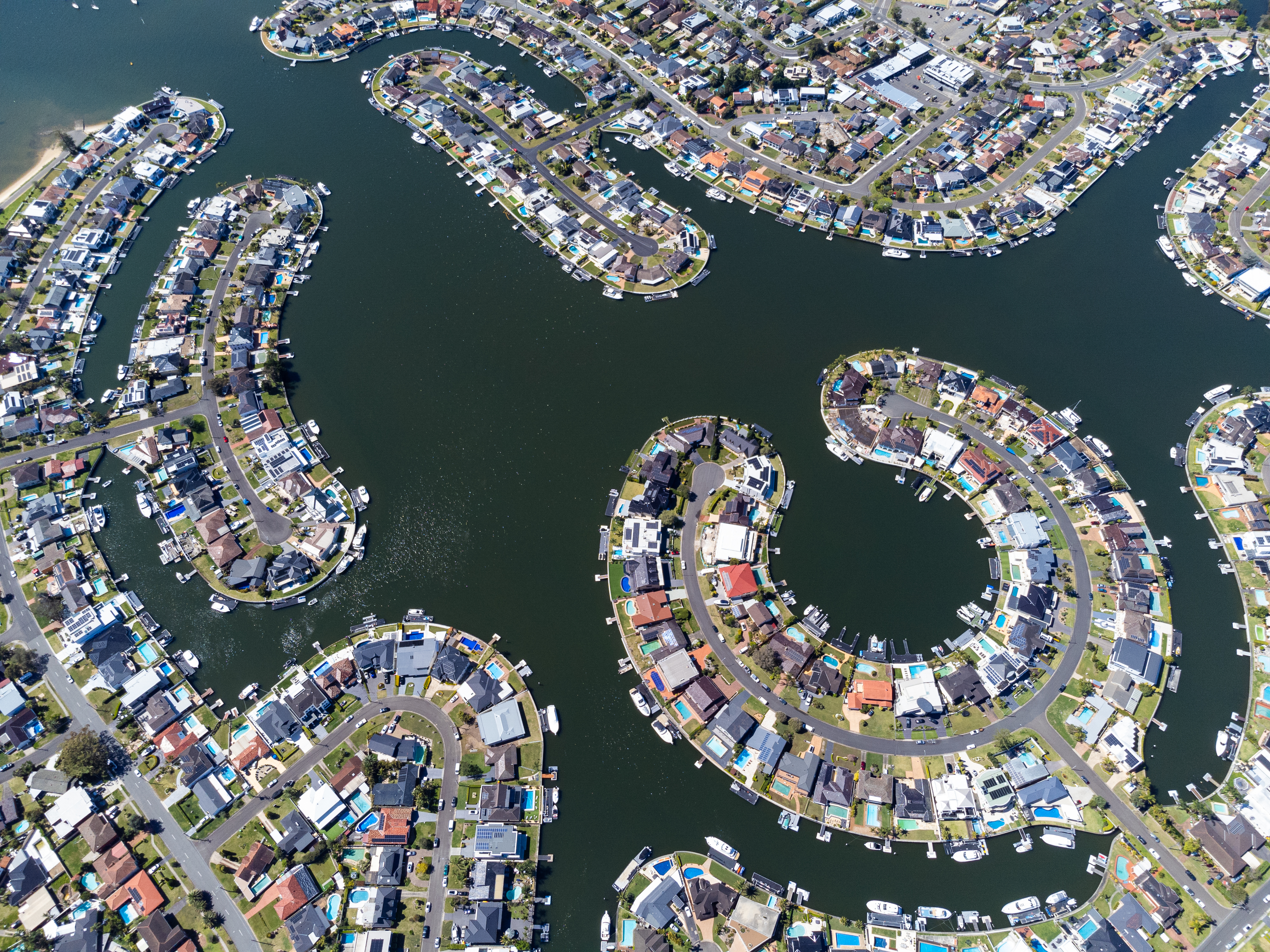
Aerial view of Sylvania Waters

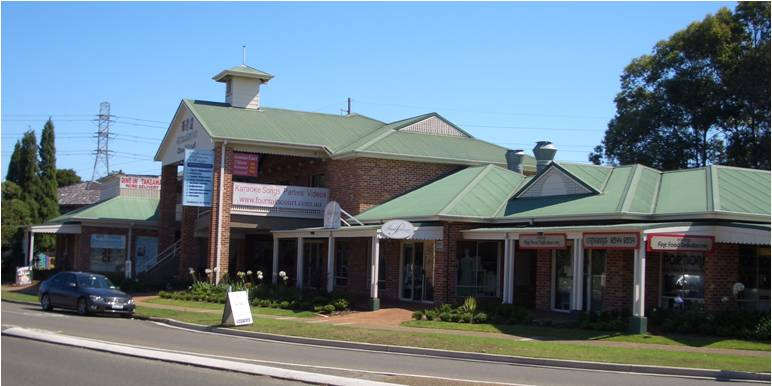
Sylvania Waters shopping village

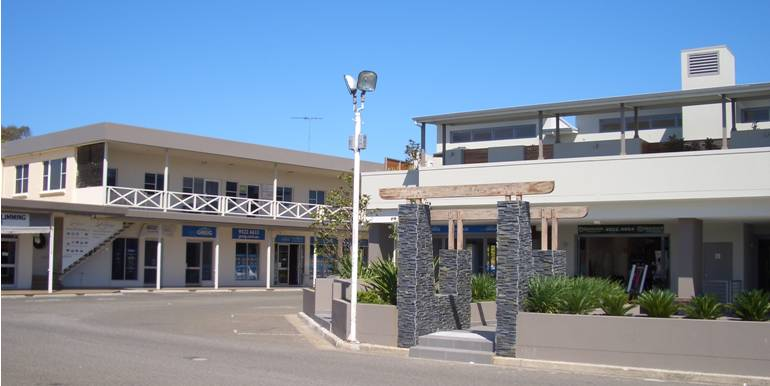
Sylvania Waters shopping centre

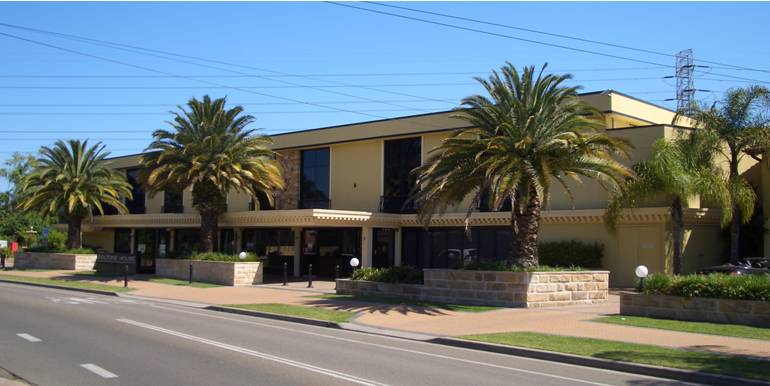
Doltone House, Sylvania Waters

== Sport ==
Sylvania Waters is home to the Sylvania Waters Athletics Track, a state-of-the-art facility which holds many local and state events. Next to this is the Sylvania Waters Tennis Court Complex and the home ground of the Southern Districts Rugby Club.

== Culture ==
Sylvania Waters was a 1992 reality television program which followed the lives of the Donaher family living at Macintyre Crescent. The suburb became infamous when the series screened across Australia and then internationally.

One of the artificial islands in Sylvania Waters (James Cook Island) was used in the filming of the movie Superman Returns (2006) as the location of Lois Lane's house.

== Demographics ==
In the 2021 census, Sylvania Waters had a population of 3,200 people. The median age of residents was 43 years, older than the national median of 38. Children aged under 15 years made up 16.6% of the population, and people aged 65 years and over made up 19.9% of the population. More than one-third (35.0%) were born overseas, similar to the national average of 33.1%. The top countries of overseas birth were China 6.2%, Hong Kong 2.1%, Greece 1.9%, England 1.8% and Egypt 1.7%. 58.8% of people spoke only English at home; the next-most-common languages spoken at home were Greek 8.8%, Mandarin 5.8%, Cantonese 5.0%, Arabic 3.4%, and Macedonian 2.4%. The most-common responses regarding religious affiliation were Roman Catholic 25.2%, No Religion 22.7%, Eastern Orthodox 18.3%, Anglican 11.3% and Not stated 5.0%. The great majority (79.8%) of occupied households in Sylvania Waters are separate houses, 10.4% were semi-detached, row or terrace houses, townhouses etc., and 9.2% were flats, units, or apartments. The average household size was 2.9 people.

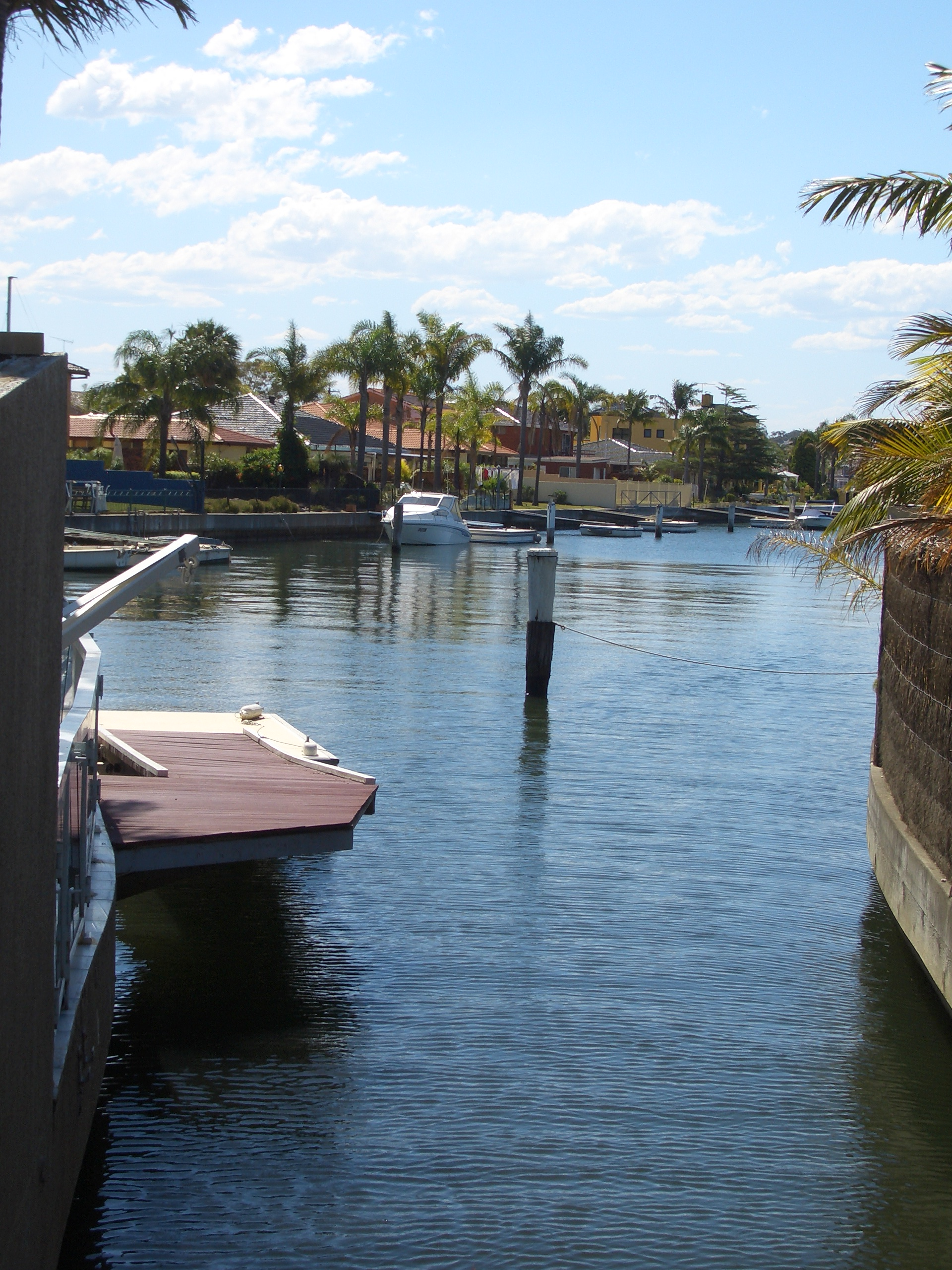
Sylvania Waters
