= Ray Lawless =

Ray Lawless may refer to:

- Ray Lawless (rugby league, born 1930) (1930–2009), Australian rugby league player
- Ray Lawless (rugby league, born 1909) (1909–1968), New Zealand rugby league player
