= Oatley Park, New South Wales =

Park in New South Wales, Australia

Coordinates: 33.981908°S 151.059616°E

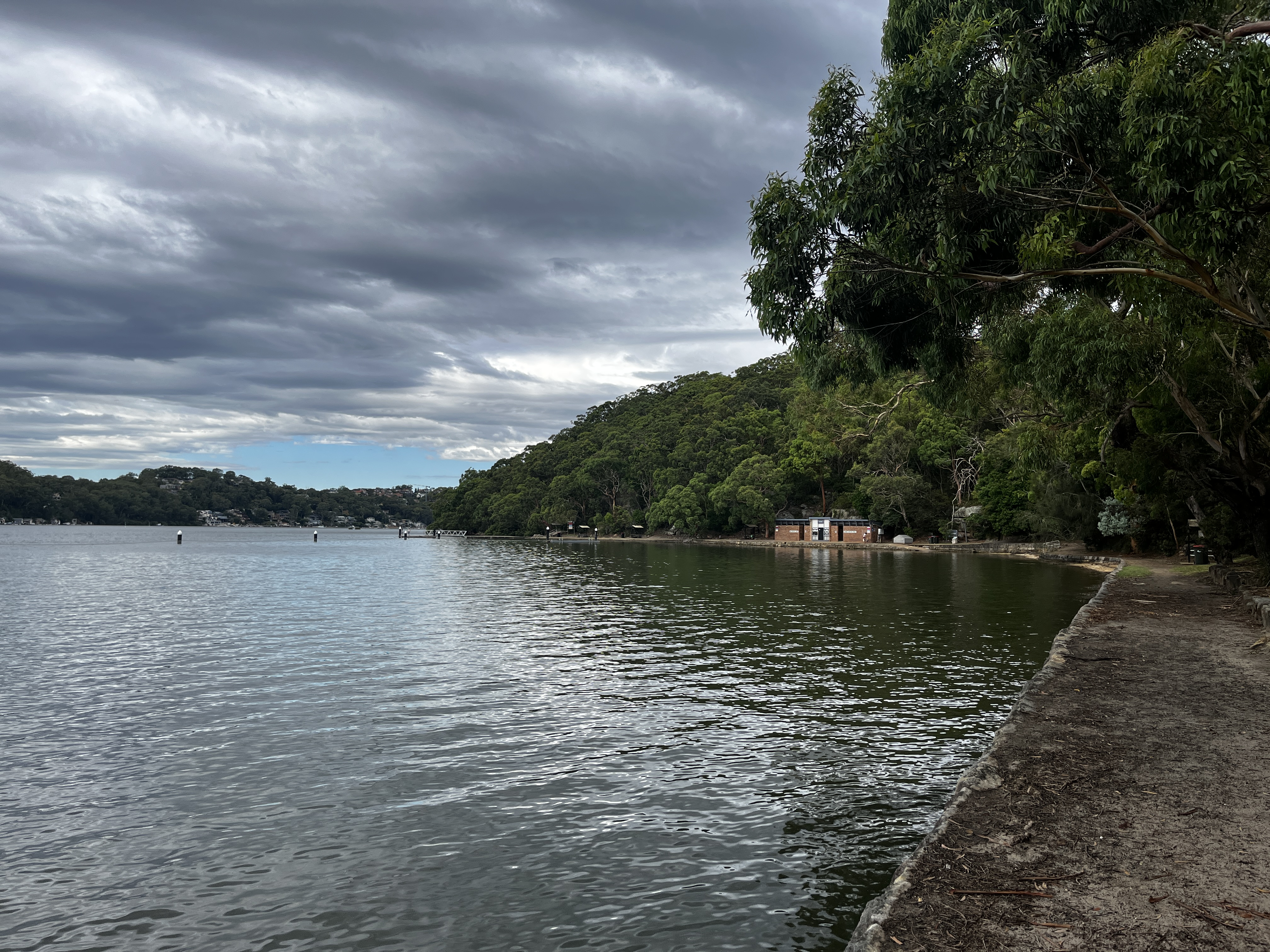
The Jewfish Bay Baths, also known as Oatley Park Baths, 2025

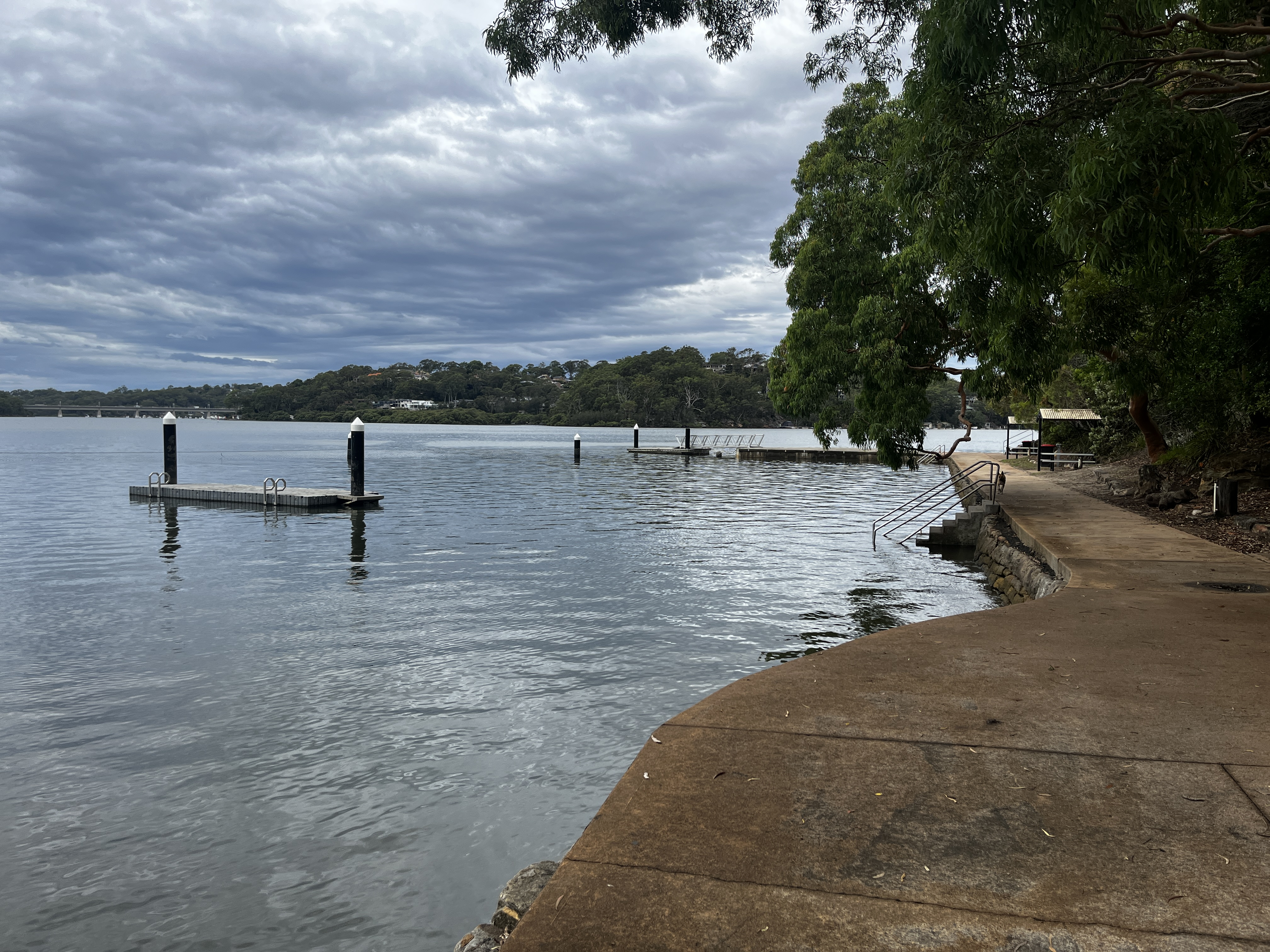
The pontoon at the Jewfish Bay Baths, also known as Oatley Park Baths, 2025

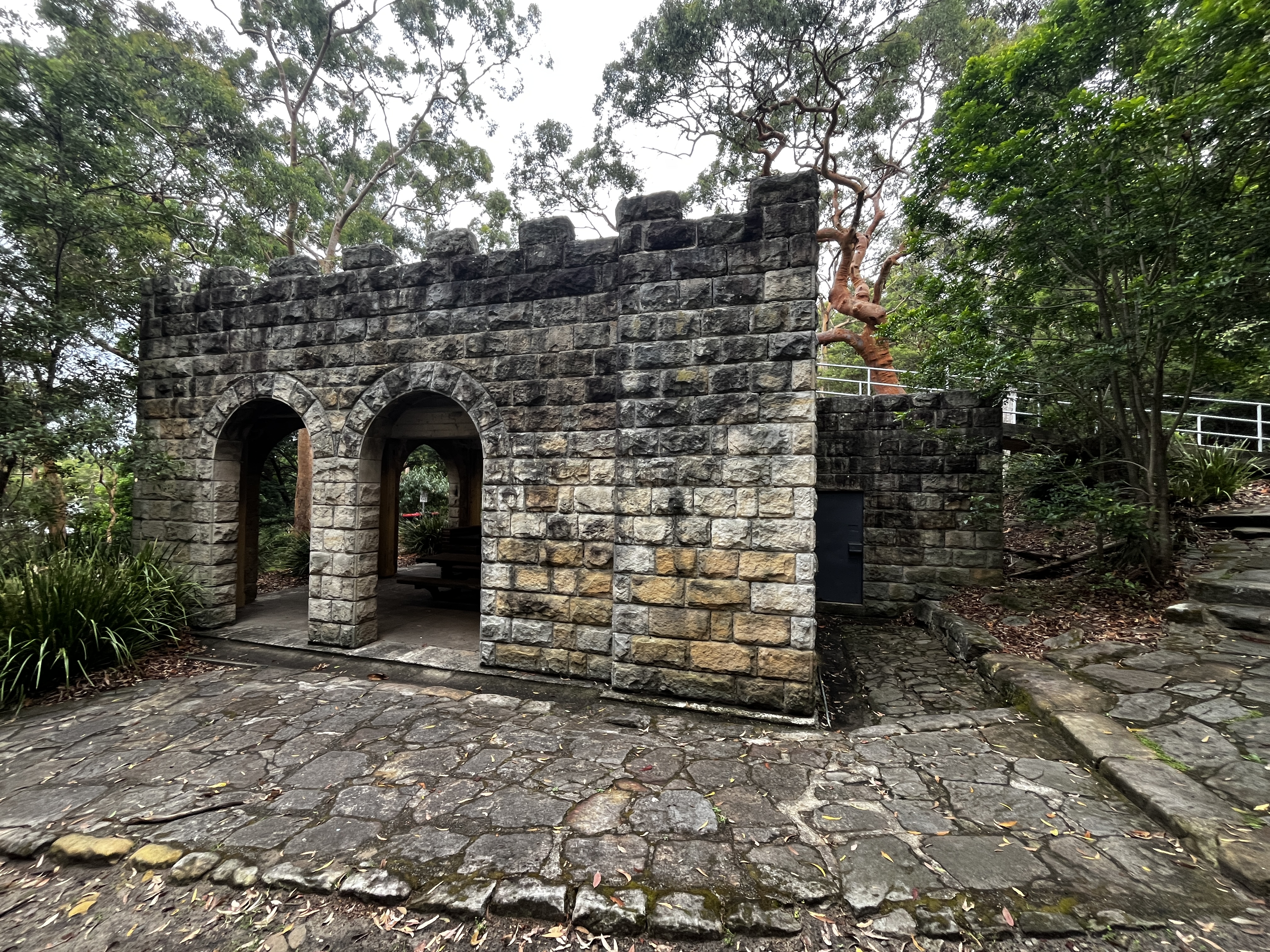
A close up view of Oatley Park Castle, 2025

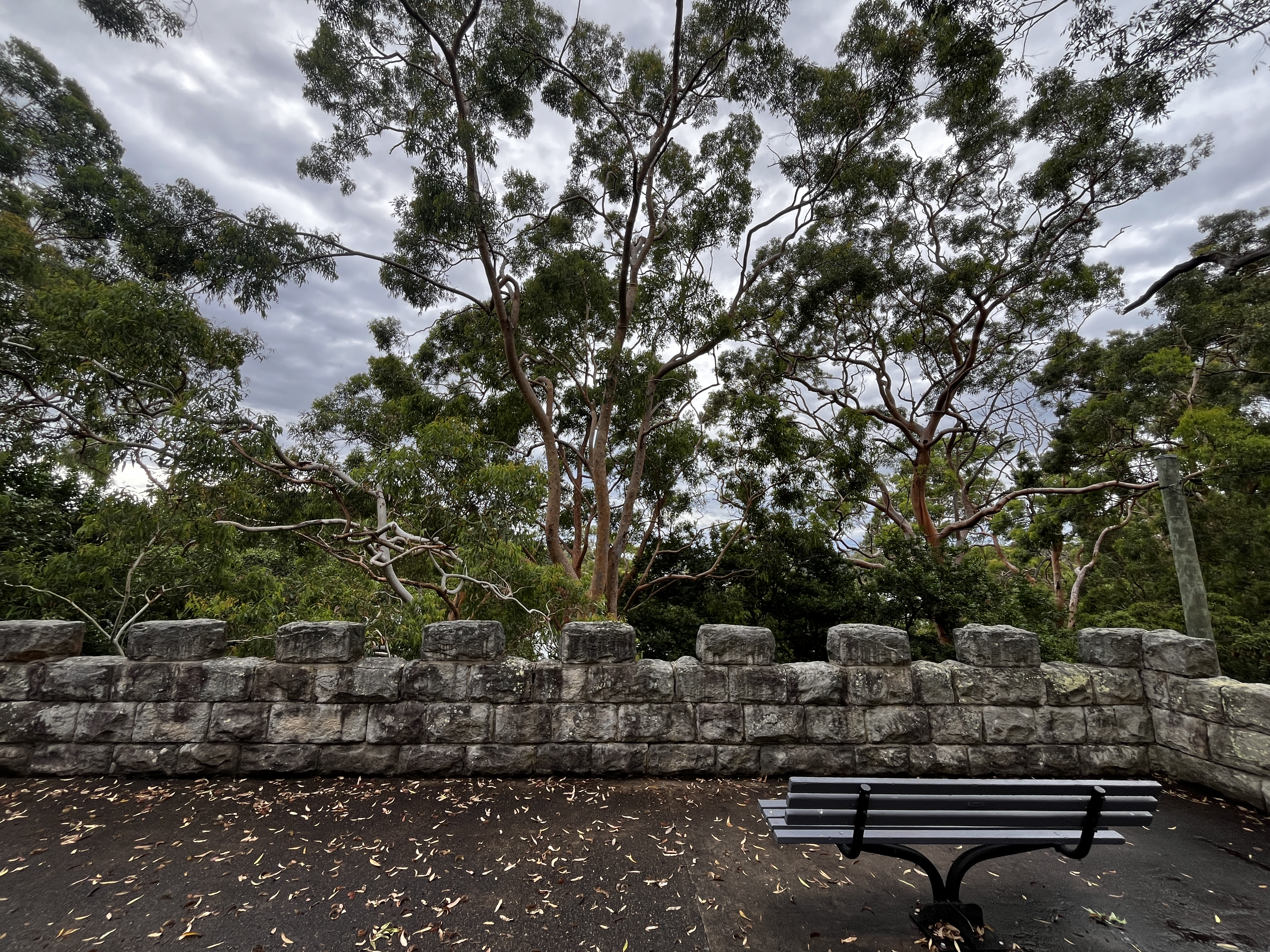
The top and viewing platform of Oatley Park Castle, 2025

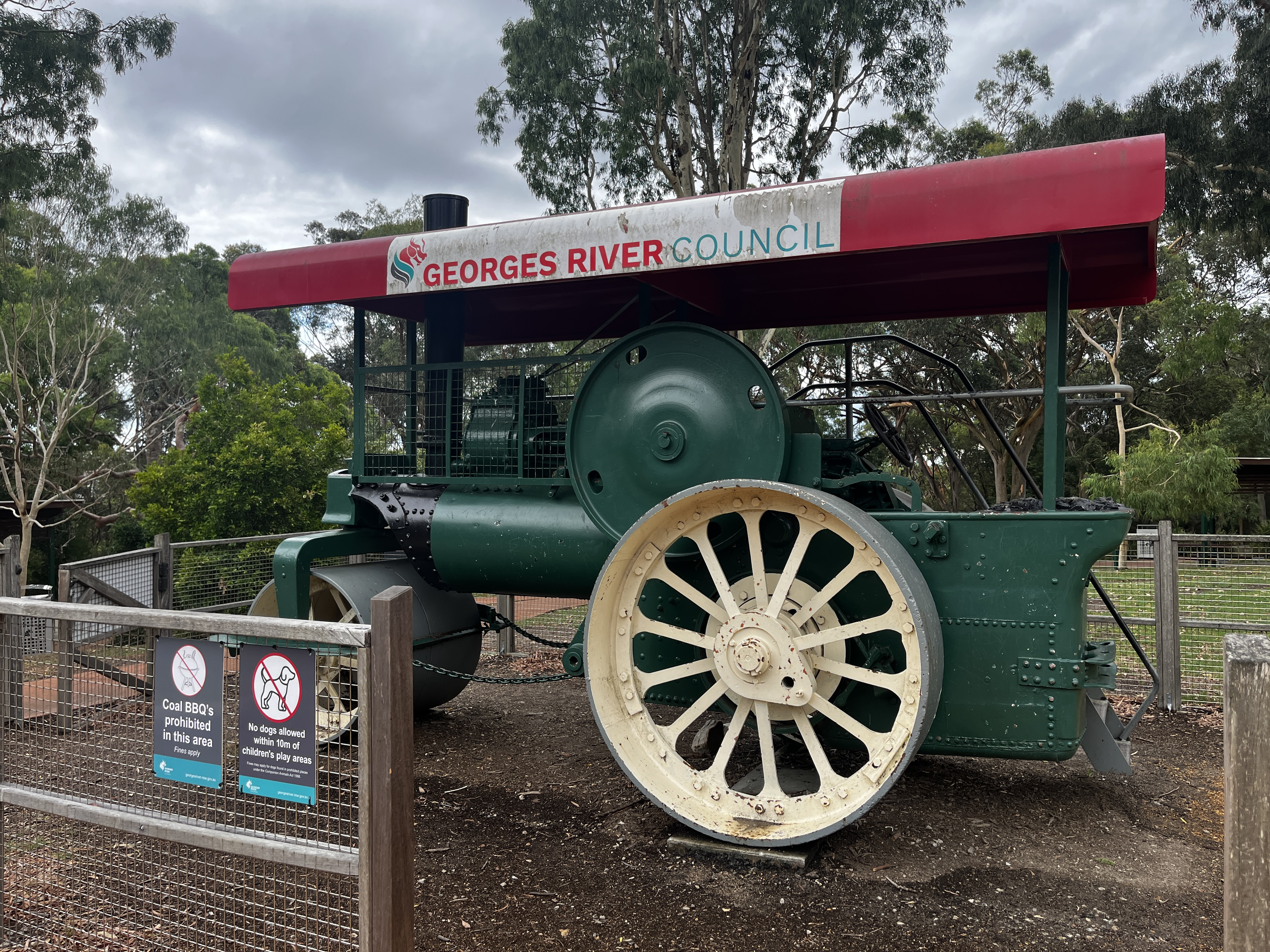
The steamroller in Oatley Bush Park Playground, 2025

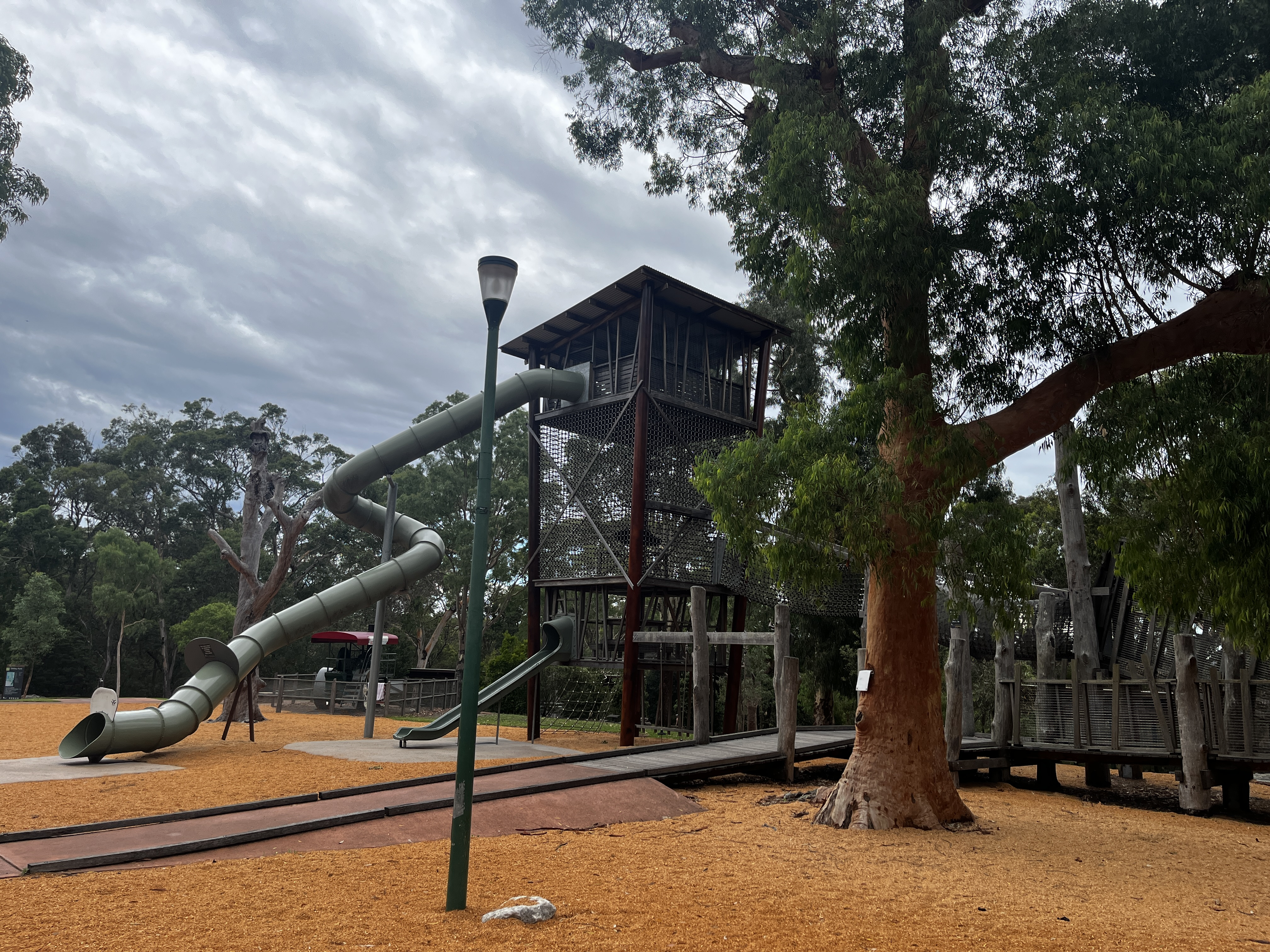
Oatley Bush Park Playground, 2025

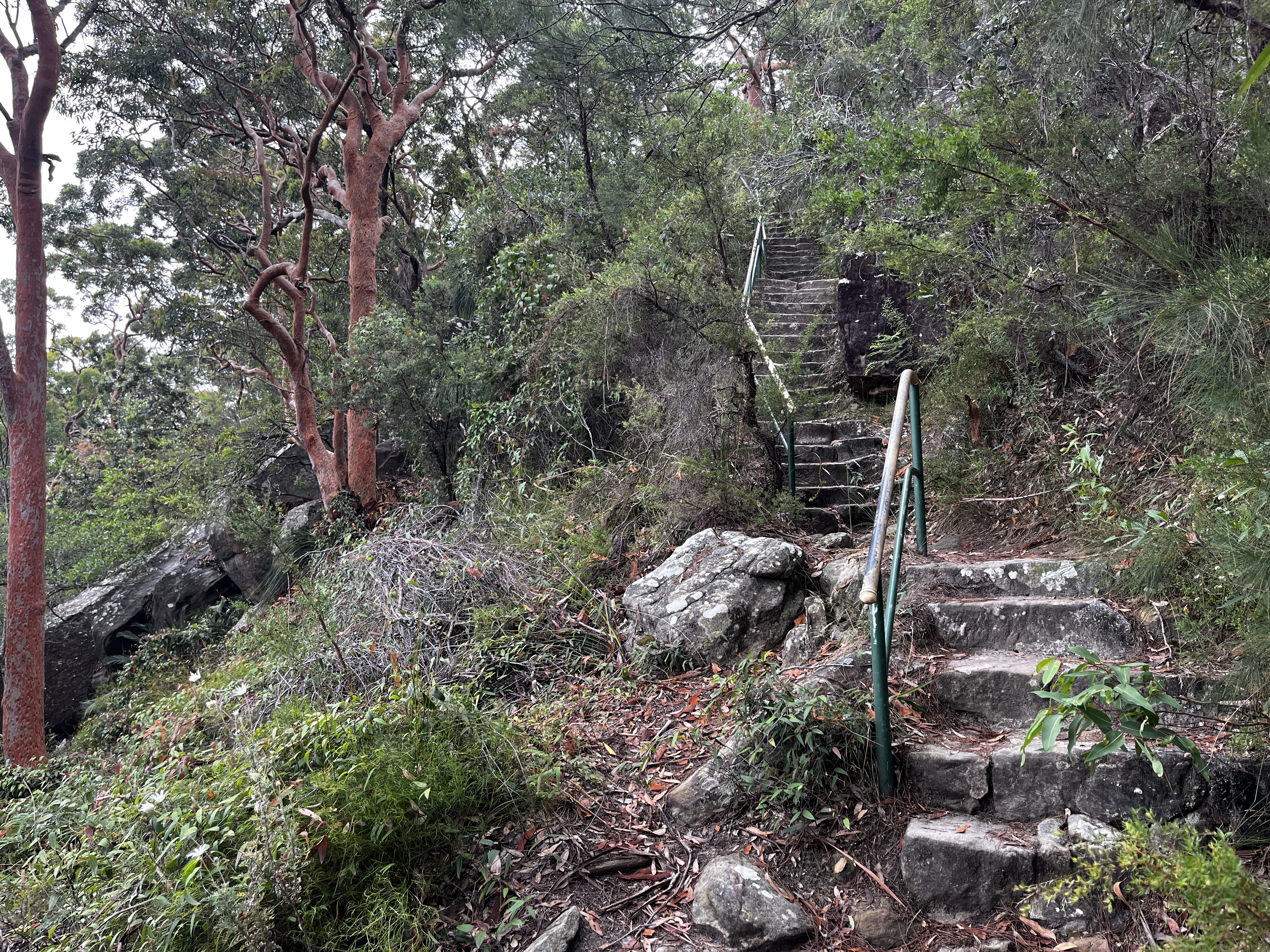
Stairs on a walking path at Oatley Park, 2025

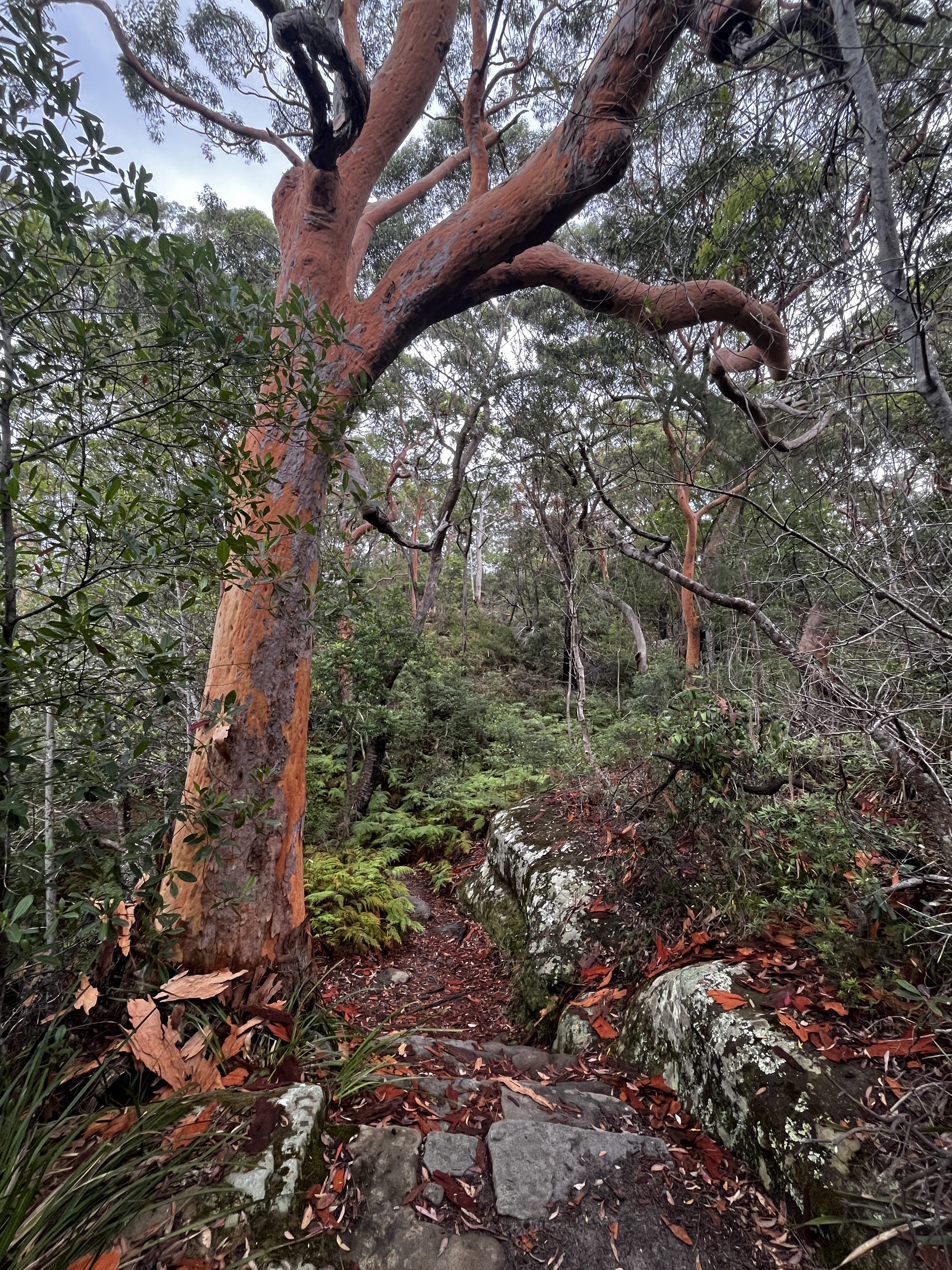
A bush track in Oatley Park, 2025

Oatley Park is a 112 acres (45 ha) reserve located on a promontory jutting into the Georges River in the southern Sydney suburb of Oatley. It is bounded by the Georges River, Lime Kiln Bay, and Jew Fish Bay. The park includes natural bushland, waterways, a playground, and an oval. The park is a popular place for picnics, recreational, and sporting activities.

== History ==
There is evidence of Bidjigal activity in the park including rock carvings and shell middens.

An area of 112 acres was dedicated for Public Recreation in the NSW Government Gazette on 25 March 1887, and the land was proclaimed on 29 May 1888 as a public park for recreation. It was initially known as Peakhurst Park, with Hurstville Council being appointed trustee in 1908. Even then it was recognised as being one of the few sizeable areas of waterfront land not privately owned. During March 1922 the name of the reserve was changed to Oatley Park.

During 1919 a Turkish Pine pinus brutia was planted near the main entrance, from a seed that was collected from the Lone Pine on the Gallipoli Peninsula, Turkey.

The sandy bay of Oatley Park, named Jewfish Bay Baths (or Oatley Park Baths), had long been used as a swimming spot for local residents. The records do not show when the baths were built but they are known to have been in use in 1919, when Mortdale P & C Association applied for the beach as a bath site. They are one of New South Wales' largest swimming enclosures and is 320 metres (1,050 ft) across. The Oatley Swimming Club was founded there in 1927.

During the depression of the 1930s, considerable work was done there under the Unemployment Relief Scheme. The scenic road was constructed around the river foreshores (as part of a wider scheme never completed). At the same time, the kiosk and eye-catching castellated tower, known as Oatley Park Castle, were built as an attraction for visitors. Several paths and scenic lookouts were also formed, giving excellent views over the river.

In July 1942, the 26th Field Company of the Royal Australian Engineers was moved from Carss Park to Oatley Park. Several temporary structures were assembled to accommodate about 250 soldiers, including a mess tent, kitchen, shower blocks, an Aldershot oven, and storehouse. By January 1943, after only 6 months, most of these soldiers had joined the AIF for service in New Guinea so the 26th Field Company was disbanded. They were then replaced by the Tasmanian 12th Field Company, RAE, which was stationed there for 10 weeks. The concrete floor of a kitchen, ordinance store and shower block, some stone steps and a small concrete map of Tasmania can still be seen.

== Fauna and flora ==
As one of Sydney's finest areas of natural bushland, Oatley Park is noted for its trees, shrubs and native flowers, as well as the river beaches and prolific bird life.

- Over 310 plant species have been recorded. The park is an important regional sanctuary protecting a number of plant species not found anywhere else in the St George area.
- 107 bird species have been recorded. It is an important sanctuary for both resident and migratory birds.
- Numerous reptile species have been observed including snakes and lizards
- Possums are the main mammal species, but the park is also home to bats, swamp wallabies, and echidnas.

== Features and facilities ==
Oatley Park is popular with visitors all year round enjoying a variety of recreational and sporting activities from picnics in Steamroller Park, swimming in the Baths in Sandy Bay to enjoying the many walking tracks and cycleways. The Oatley Park Castle is available to hire for private functions, from weddings to corporate functions.

Oatley Park has a number of prominent features:

- Castellated Tower (the Oatley Park Castle), with barbecue area and upper lookout.
- Oatley Park Oval, home to cricket and soccer clubs
- Steamroller Park or Oatley Bush Park Playground, containing a historic steamroller and adventure playground.
- Sandy Bay, with pier and swimming enclosure containing the Jewfish Bay Baths, which are also known as the Oatley Park Baths, which are home to the Oatley Amateur Swimming Club.
- Lime Kiln Wetlands, featuring mangroves and a series of ponds populated by ducks and other water birds.
- Myra Wall Garden, constructed in 1964 to honour a local conservationist.
- Websters and Hills Peak Lookouts, with views over Jew Fish Bay and Lime Kiln Bay.
- Draculas Canteen, a large rock overhang.

== See also ==
- Oatley Pleasure Grounds
- Oatley Point Reserve
- Mortdale Memorial Park
- Parks in Sydney
