= James Oatley =

Colonial Australian clock maker and land owner

James Oatley Snr (c. 1769–1839) was a British-born colonial Australian watch and clock maker and one-time convict.

He is considered one of Australia’s most important early clock and watchmakers who was best known for his longcase clocks as well as for the building the turret clock at Sydney's Hyde Park Barracks.

The suburb of Oatley is also named for him.

== Early life and conviction ==
Oatley was allegedly from Stafford and aged 44, was sentenced death on 7 March 1814 which at the Hampshire Assizes which was later commuted to penal transportation.

Oatley already had a number of convictions, dating back to 1806, when he had stolen one ton of cheese. He was sent to Australia for stealing shirts and bedding.

== Life in colonial Sydney ==
Oatley arrived in Sydney on 27 January 1815 on board the Marquis of Wellington. He had been sentenced to transportation for life and was, soon after appointed by the then governor Lachlan Macquarie as the keeper of the town clock. Additionally in 1818 he was awarded the commission to install the clock at Hyde Park Barracks and following this created a successful clock making business in the Sydney CBD.

On 25 October 1821, he was given a conditional pardon. In this record, Oatley is mentioned as a "native of Warwickshire", and a physical description is also provided; he is described as being pale, with dark brown hair, grey eyes, 5'5", and "stout" (with the remainder of the instrument of pardon being difficult to read).

Oatley was awarded several land grants; in 1831 and on 30 October 1832, 24 December 1833, 23 January 1834, and 27 July 1835. Areas covered by these land grants include Snugborough (in the vicinity of the modern Moorefields Road, Kingsgrove), which he farmed, and Needwood Forest (now Hurstville Grove). In total, the land approximately covered is similar to that now bounded by Canterbury Road, Belmore, to the north, King George Road to the west, Kingsgrove Road to the east, and the Georges River to the south.

== Death ==
James Oatley died on 9 October 1839. His death notice in the Sydney Monitor gives his age as 72 years; the Parish record of his burial gives James' age as 70 years. Oatley was buried on his property, Snugborough.

== Legacy ==
Examples of Oatley’s clocks, of which there are approximately 22 known examples, are considered a fine examples of colonial craftsmanship and they are sought after by collectors. There are also clocks held by major Australian cultural collections including Oatley long case clock at the National Museum of Australia and another at the Art Gallery of South Australia.

Additionally Oatley and his family's and his children's legacy has been reflected via geography. In 1903, the southern Sydney suburb of Oatley was named after the family. Prior to that, the area west of the railway line was known as New Oatley's, which was a sub-district of Hurstville, and Oatley Platform; east of the railway line was known as Oatley's, which was a sub-district of Kogarah. In 1905, Frederick Street, Oatley, named after Frederick Stokes Oatley, was constructed as the main street of the new suburb.

Oatley Street, Woollahra, lying between Ocean Street and Edgecliffe Street, existed in the 1850s and early 1860s. Frederick Stokes Oatley resided between Ocean Street and Oatley Street, Woollahra.

Oatley Lane, Oatley Street, and Oatley Road, all of which were named after James Oatley Jnr, existed in East Sydney. Oatley Road extended into Paddington. A remnant of Oatley Road still exists in Paddington, running beside the Victoria Barracks.

The original Oatley land between Moorefields Road and the railway line through Kingsgrove Station remained largely as open paddocks until it was subdivided for housing and industry in the early 1970s. A street off Kingsgrove Road was named after James Oatley. Just north of Moorefields Road are Robert Street and Eleanor Avenue.

== Personal life ==
The personal life of James Oatley was well documented in the 1825 Muster of New South Wales, and in his will. Oatley married twice. In England, he married Sarah Bennett. Little is known about this marriage. James than had a de facto relationship with Mary Stokes, his housekeeper. Mary was the mother of his three sons, James Stokes Jnr, Frederick Stokes, and George (1820–1821) shown as James' children in the 1825 Muster, and each described in James' will as "my adopted son". Mary arrived in Sydney on 8 June 1815 on board the Northampton, with her son, then called James [but later renamed Robert], born during the voyage. The 1825 muster clearly indicates that Robert was Mary's child, but not James' child. Robert was described as "an adopted child" in James' will. After Mary's death, Oatley married Mary Ann Bogg in 1833.

=== Children ===
- Marianne/Marion Oatley (c1808-22 March 1866): died as Mrs Borrett.
- James Oatley (1817–1878) was a coach builder and engineer by trade. James Stokes Oatley Jnr assumed responsibility for running the family farm after Oatley Snr's death. The farm was later sold and James became an innkeeper (also described as licensee and victualler) until he entered the NSW Parliament as a Member of the Legislative Assembly in 1868. James married Eleanor Johnson (also known as Ellen, Helena, and Emily), with whom he had eight children. After Eleanor's death, James married Margaret Curtis, with whom he had one daughter
- Frederick Stokes Oatley (1819–1890) was a watchmaker and Inspector of Abattoirs. Frederick married Jane Weedon, with whom he had twelve children. James Snr gave to Frederick his watchmaking business in George Street, Sydney, and Needwood Forest. By the 1860s, Frederick had given up the watchmaking business; and, in 1881, he sold 300 acres (1.2 km^{2}) of Needwood Forest.
- Robert Oatley (1815–1876) was adopted by James Oatley, but not his biological child. Robert, a cooper by trade, was born at sea en route to Sydney and was initially named James. After his name change and legal adoption by James Oatley, Robert was baptized about a year after his arrival in Sydney. Robert did not marry.

=== Other descendants of Oatley Snr ===
- Gwen Ruth Oatley (1918–24 December 2000) was the granddaughter of James Oatley Jnr's second son, Frederick. Gwen was awarded a Medal of the Order of Australia in 1978 for services to the Australian film industry.
- Frederick "Dudley" Weedon Oatley (1884–28 March 1919) was the grandson of Frederick Stokes Oatley. Frederick was a Lieutenant-Colonel in the Australian Imperial Force and served in World War One. When he died, Frederick was given a funeral on 30 March 1919 with full military honours. Frederick actually died from a massive hydatid cyst in his thoracic cavity, compressing his heart and lungs and resulting in widespread gangrene (Death Certificate).

== See also ==
- Oatley, New South Wales
