= Moore Reserve =

Reserve in Kogarah LGA, New South Wales, Australia

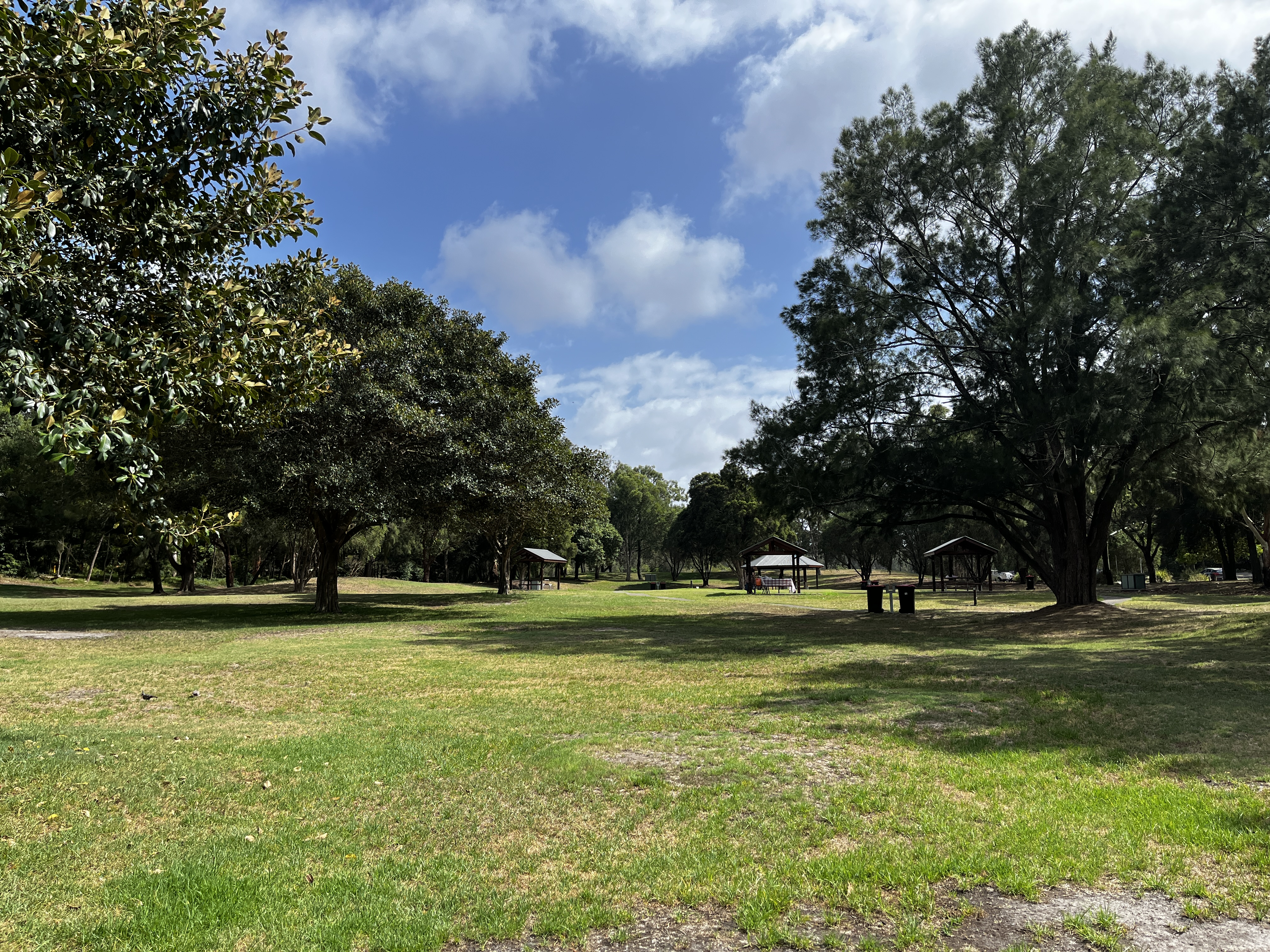
- Interactive map of Moore Reserve
- Nearest city: Hurstville
- Coordinates: 33°58′57″S 151°05′18″E
- Website: Moore Reserve, Hurstville Grove

Moore Reserve is a 14.2 hectares (35 acres) park surrounded by the Sydney suburbs of Oatley, Mortdale and Hurstville Grove. It is a public space in the Georges River Council and is on the traditional lands of the Bidjigal people.

The area was originally part of the north west arm of the Georges River, and what is now Moore Reserve was created from the 1930s by infilling with mud dredged from Oatley Bay. This was done in an attempt to remove "unhealthy mosquito breeding swamps" and it was during this period it became known as Moore Reserve. This naming was in honour of Guy Moore, an Oatley resident, wo had been involved in local council and was interested in conservation.

This was further extended between 1967 and 1970 and building materials, refuse and old cars were used to consolidate the mud. Following this consolidation it was used as a municipal rubbish tip between 1970 and 1975 and it is estimated the 375,000 tonnes of waste were deposited during this period.

In 1977 the land became a reserve, with advocacy from the Oatley Bay Residents’ Group, and a capping layer and topsoil was added to encourage plant growth.

An artificial wetland was completed here in 2001 which uses natural processes to treat 95% of all stormwater runoff from the 125 hectare catchment before it enters Oatley Bay.

== Features ==
Moore Reserve has the following features:

- A large parking area
- Large open fields accommodating a variety of sporting activities
- An outdoor fitness play set
- A long path circumnavigating the park
- Swing sets, climbing equipment and other children's play sets
- Picnic tables and BBQ facilities
- Lovely views of Oatley Bay, especially from the designated viewing platform
- Waterfront access to Oatley Bay, including a boat ramp, jetty and small beach

== Gallery ==
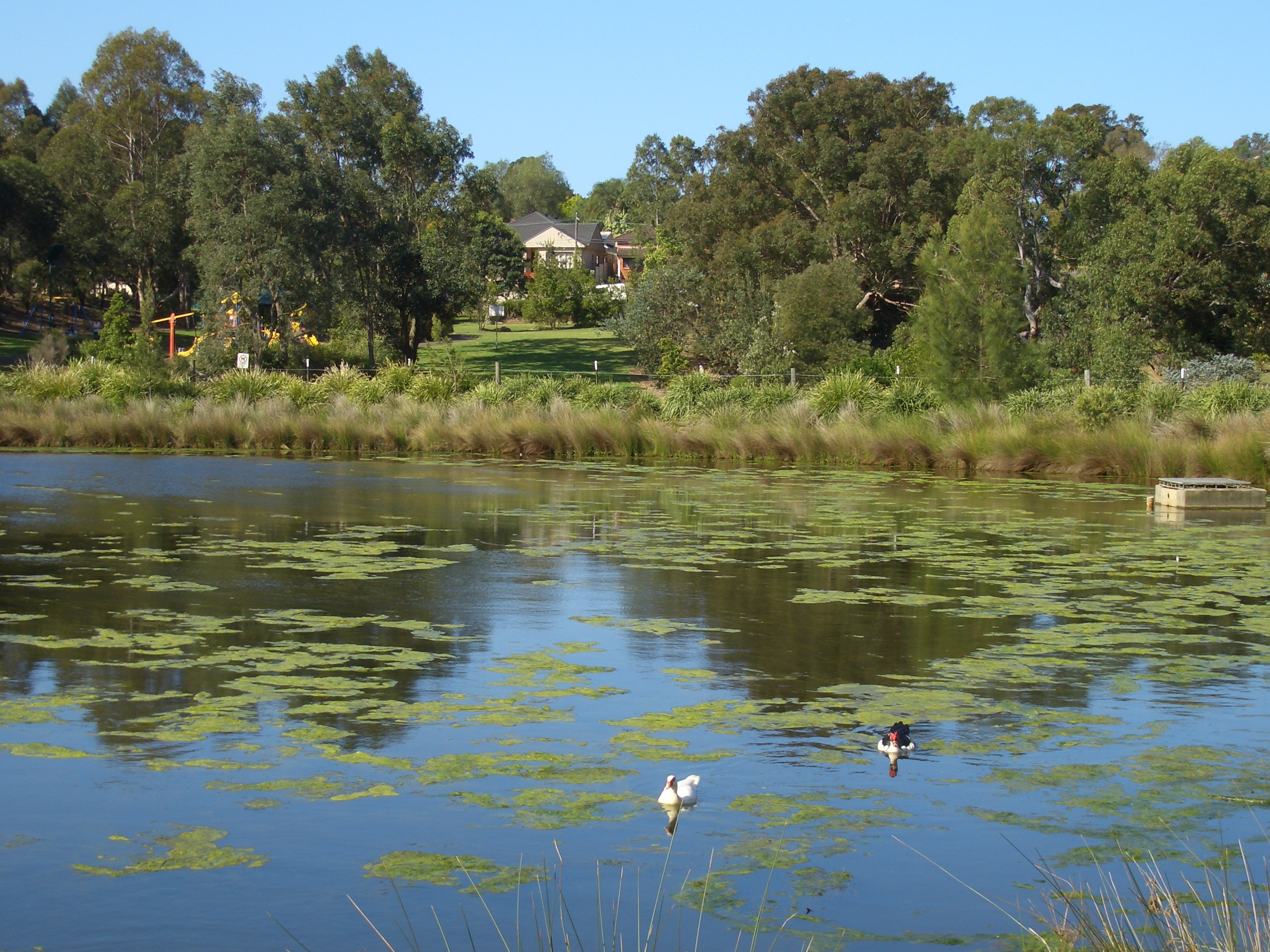
Moore Reserve Wetland, with Hurstville Grove in the background

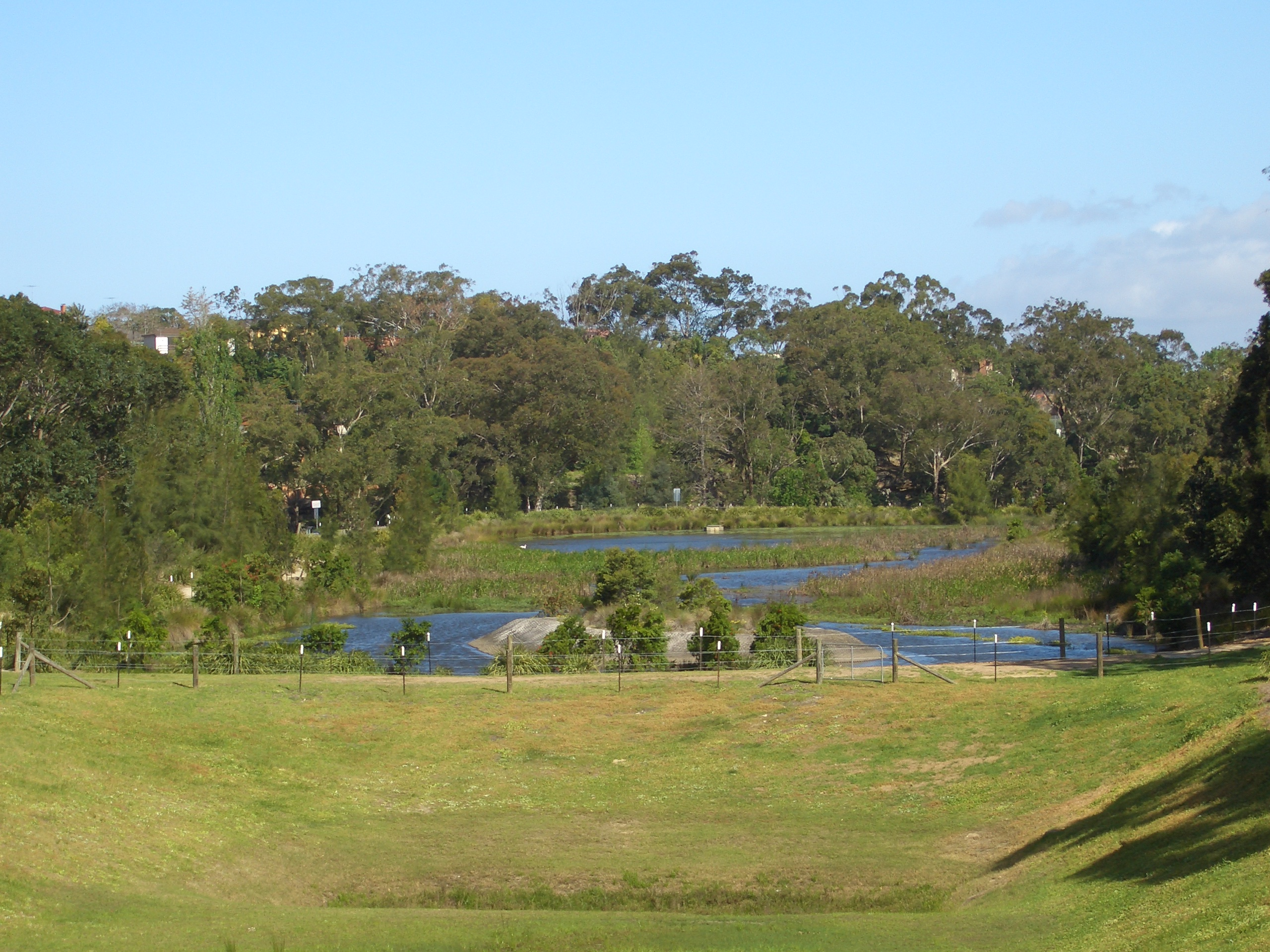
Moore Reserve, view from Hurstville Road

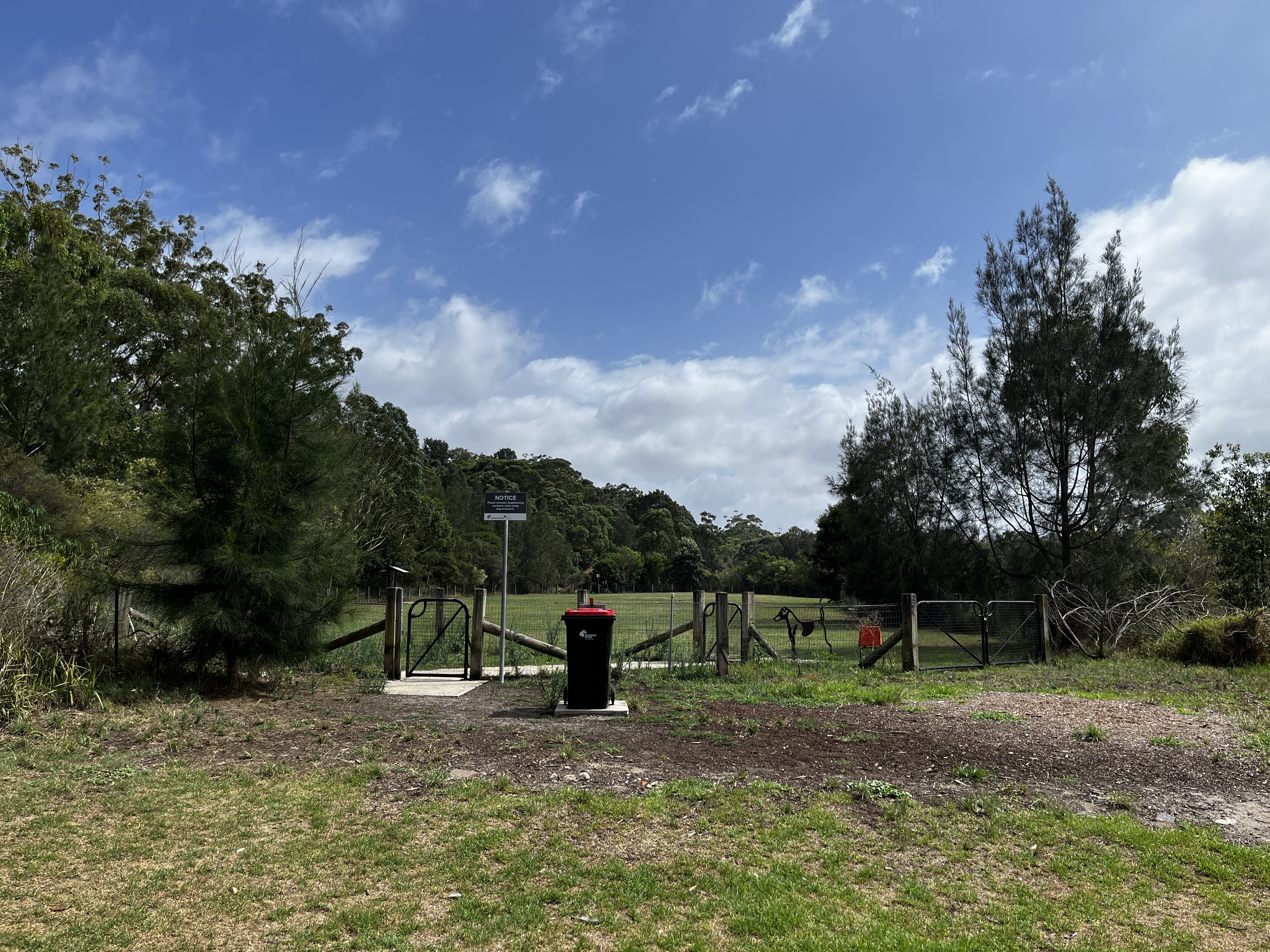
Dog off leash area at Moore Reserve, 2025

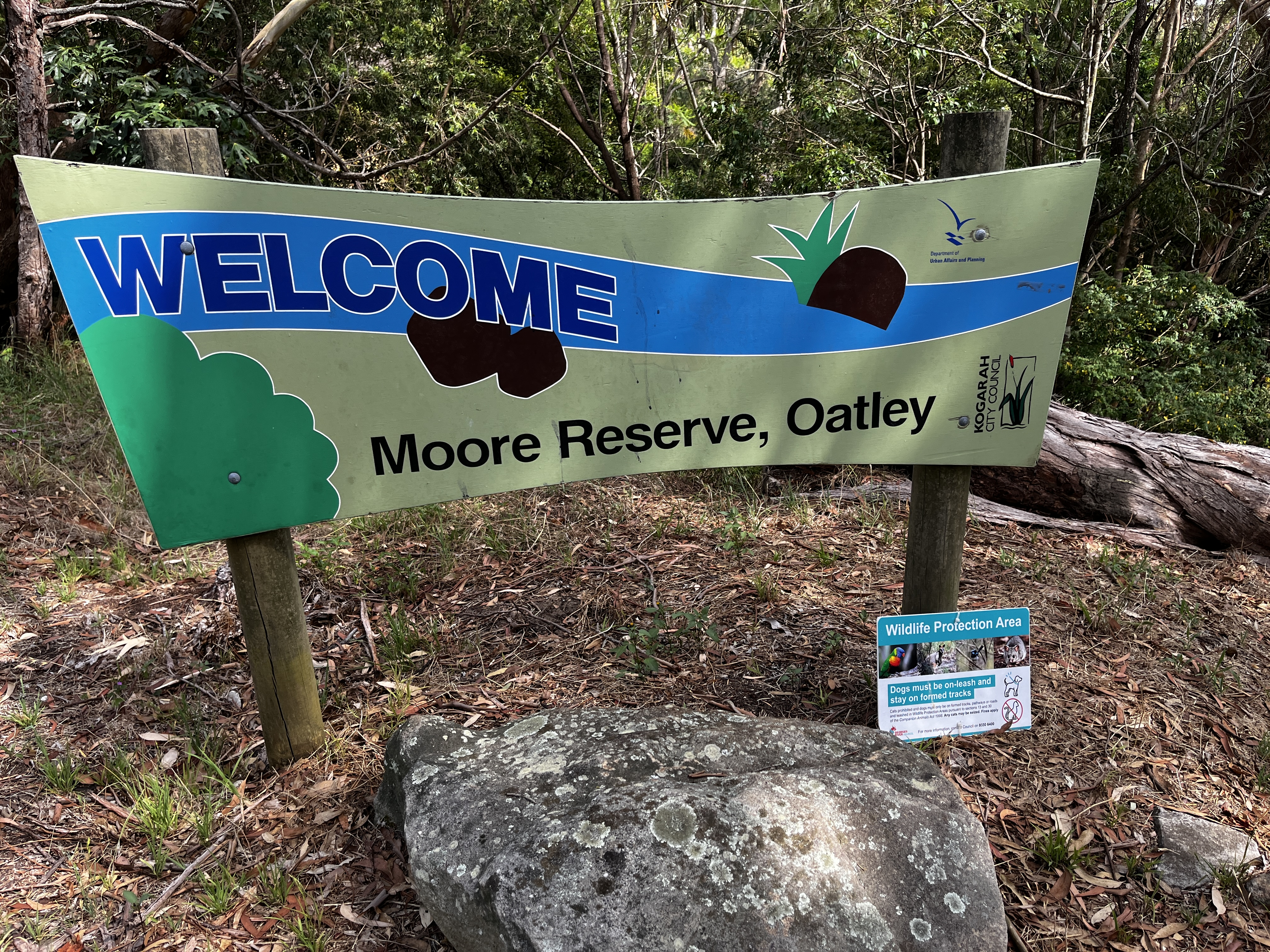
Entry sign to Moore Reserve from Asquith Street, Oatley, 2025

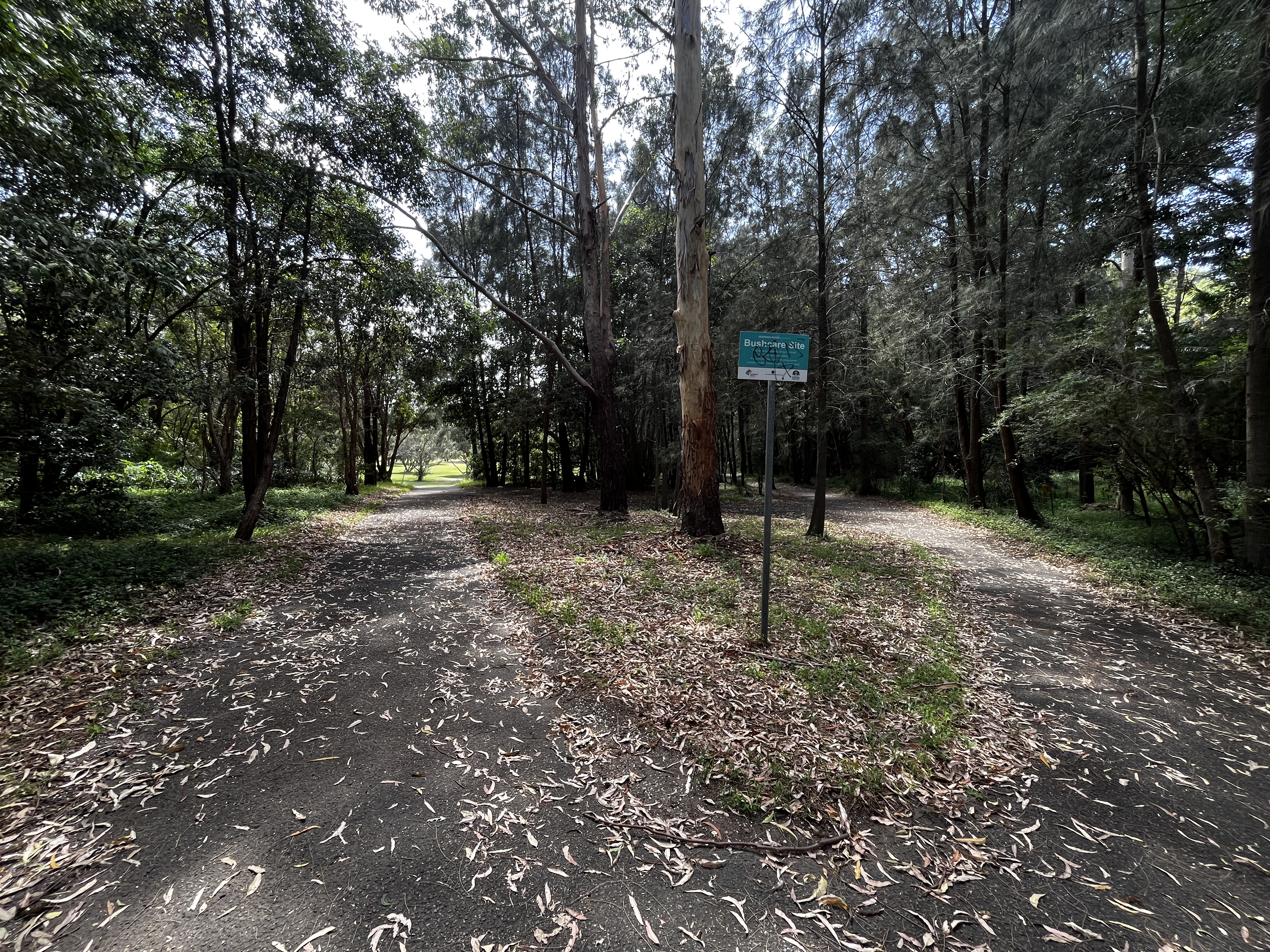
Paths at Moore Reserve, 2025

== See also ==
- Oatley Point Reserve
- Oatley Pleasure Grounds
- Parks in Sydney
- Renown Park, New South Wales
