= Oatley Point Reserve =

Reserve in Kogarah LGA, New South Wales, Australia

Oatley Pleasure Grounds
- Location within New South Wales
- Type: Public park
- Location: Oatley Point
- Nearest city: Sydney
- Coordinates: 33°59′30″S 151°05′01″E
- Operator: Kogarah City Council
- Status: Open all year

Oatley Point Reserve is a reserve located in the Sydney suburb of Oatley. It has panoramic views of Georges River and Oatley Bay, as well as some of the highest quality remnant coastal forest in the Municipality of Kogarah. It is home to a colony of sugar gliders, ringtailed possums and dusky antechinus. It has a rocky tip/point—a popular spot for fishing.

== See also ==
- Oatley Pleasure Grounds
- Oatley Park
- Moore Reserve
- Parks in Sydney
