= Oatley Bay =

Bay in Australia

Coordinates: 33°59′S 151°05′E

Oatley Bay is a bay located in the Georges River Council, surrounded by the suburbs of Oatley, Hurstville Grove and Connells Point.

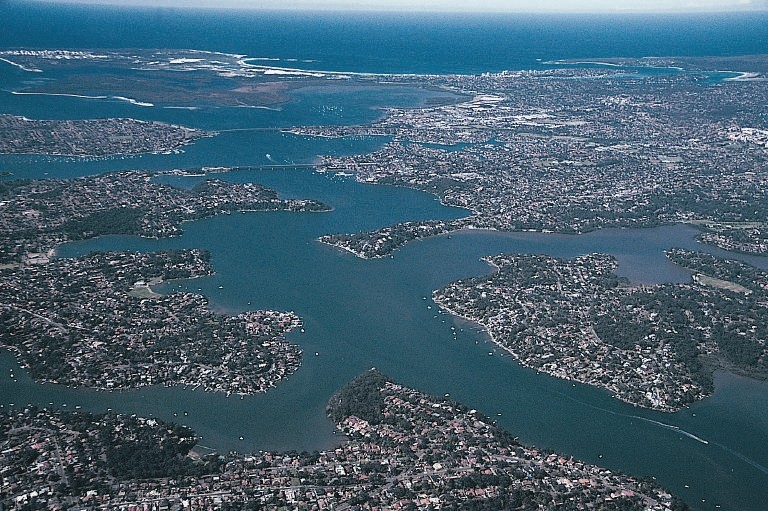
Oatley Bay, in left foreground

The bay is part of the Georges River waterway. It is popular for cycling, walking, children's play, picnics and barbecues, and is also used for boating. The area around the bay is built-up. Reserves and parks in the bay include: Poulton Park, Redin Place Reserve, Oatley Point Reserve, Oatley Pleasure Grounds and Moore Reserve.

The bay has a shallow depth, averaging about 1.5 metres, and is the end point for all run-off from the approximately 468-504 hectare Oatley Bay catchment. There is a ramp for access by boat.

== Ecology ==
The bay contains endangered flora and ecological communities, with more than two hundred plant species recorded. Oatley Bay also has one of the largest areas of mangroves in the Georges River, on the eastern shore at Poulton Park.

There was a history of oyster fishing in the bay.

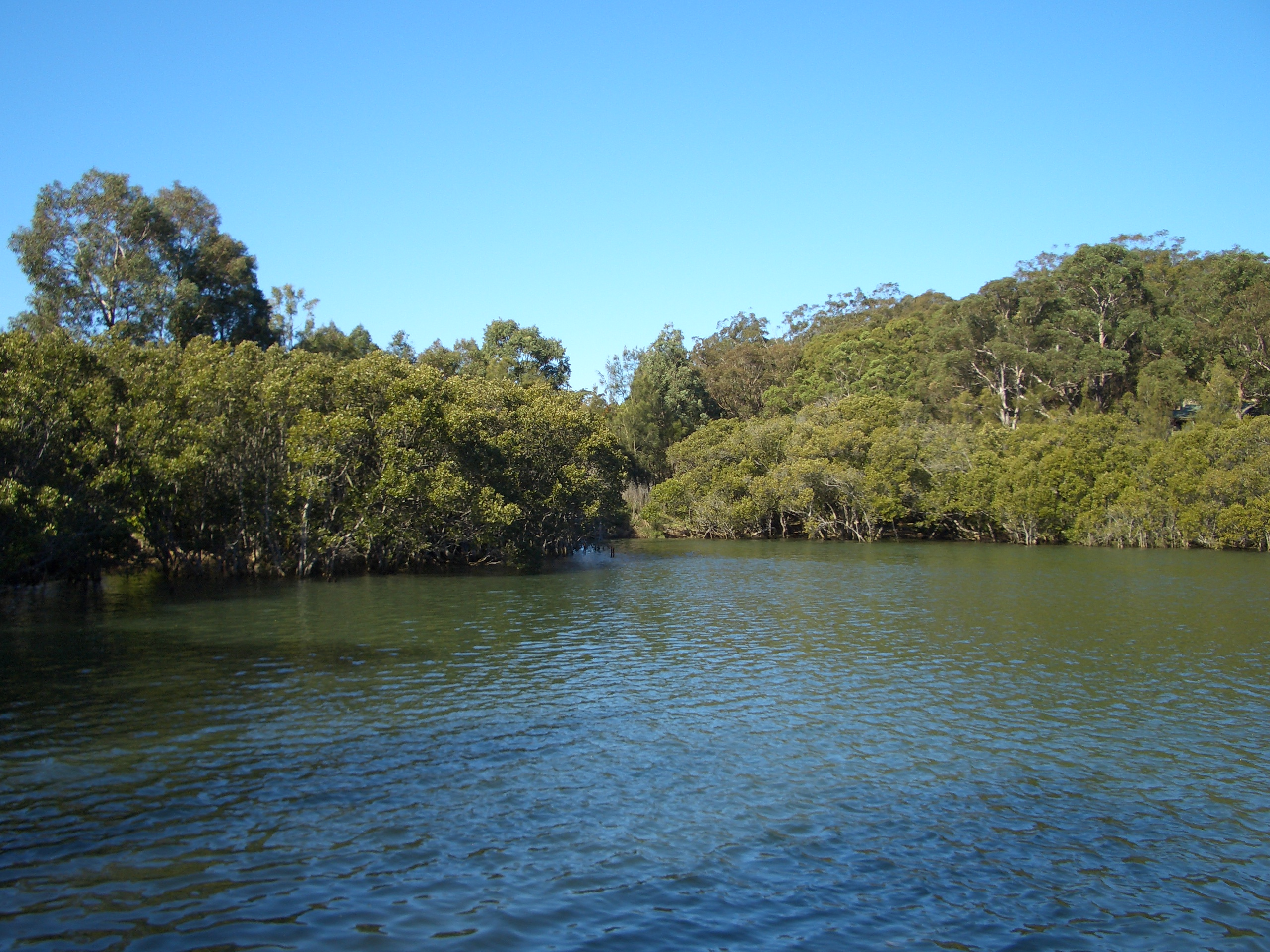
Hurstville Grove mangroves, view from Oatley Bay

== Ecological damage, protest and regeneration ==
The bay, mangrove swamps, rivers and bushland were damaged in the twentieth century by material dumped into them, partly as a result of the council's land reclamation policy. The material dumped included toxic chemicals from industry. Moore Reserve was the site of a municipal rubbish tip. Dredging had also been carried out from the 1930s. All this resulted in "extensive destruction of habitat". Building along the shores of the bay also resulted in vegetation and tree coverage in the parks being almost completely destroyed.

From the 1960s, residents protested about the environmental damage to the bay, and asked that the council act to protect the landscape and its native plants. This has been described as a "campaign ... attempting to defend a damaged and polluted river and the scarred remnants of its endemic bushland". As of 1999, water quality continued to be affected by chemicals leaching from the material dumped in the water and the swamps. Current council policy, as part of the Oatley Bay Creek Rehabilitation Project, is to regenerate, re-vegetate and conserve the biodiversity of the area, including the bushland and wetlands, and to improve the marine habitat. Some parts of Oatley Bay Creek continue to have high levels of biodiversity. Council policy is also to maintain the area for public recreation, both passive (play, picnics) and active (sports).

As of 2003, there continue to be environmental problems caused by mountain biking, rubbish and foxes.

In 2003, the bay was proposed for inclusion in the Great Kai'mia Way.

As of 2002, there was an incomplete Aboriginal land claim relating to some of the bay area.
