= Oatley, New South Wales =

Oatley
- Suburb
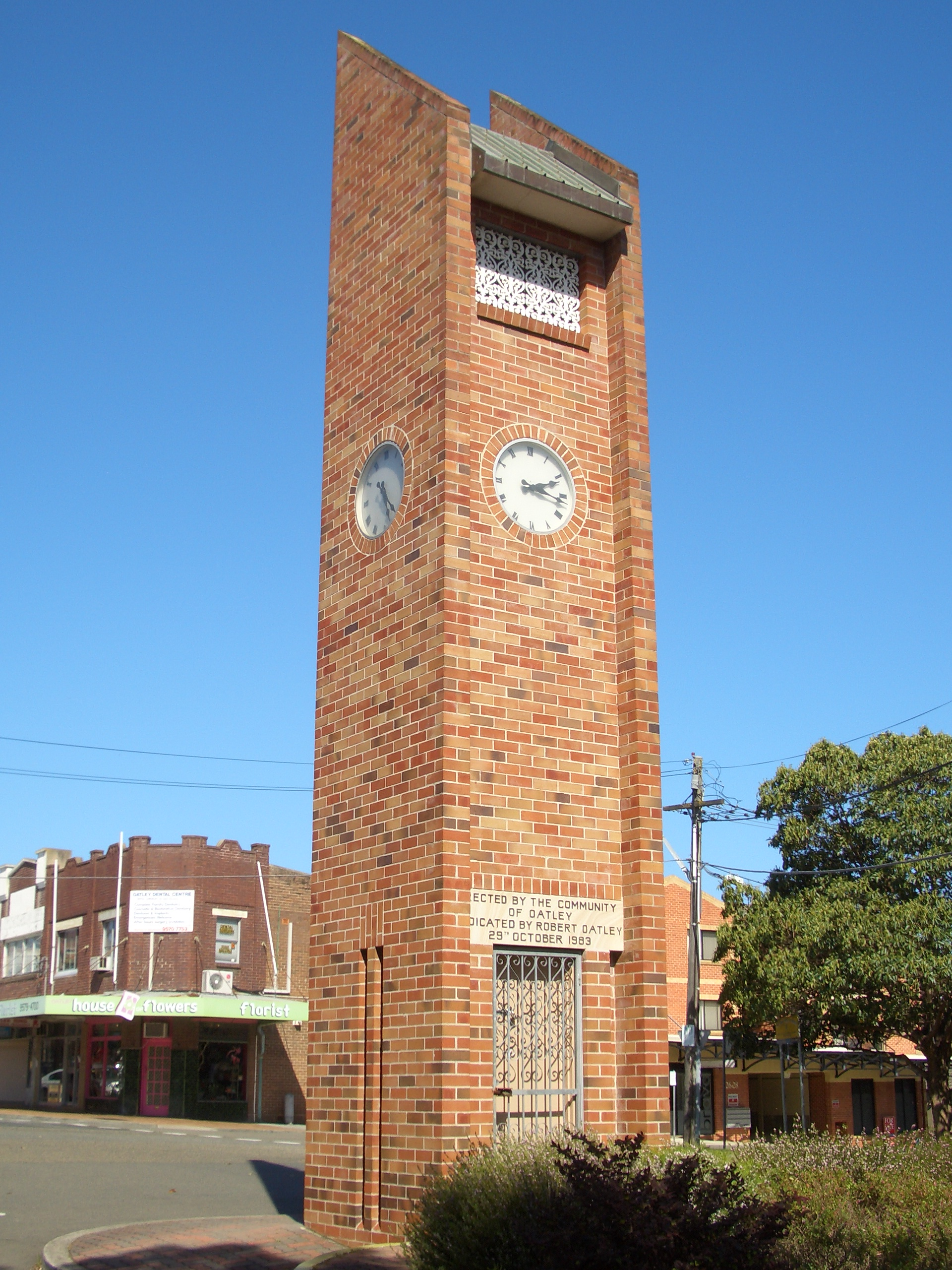
- Oatley Clock Tower, Frederick Street

- Interactive map of Oatley
- Country: Australia
- State: New South Wales
- City: Sydney
- LGA: Georges River Council
- Location: 18 km (11 mi) south of Sydney CBD
- Established: 1883

Government
  - State electorate: Oatley
  - Federal division: Banks
- Elevation: 48 m (157 ft)

Population
  - Total: 10,664 (2021 census)
- Postcode: 2223
Suburbs around Oatley
Peakhurst Heights	Mortdale	Hurstville Grove
Lugarno	Oatley	Connells Point
Illawong	Como	Oyster Bay

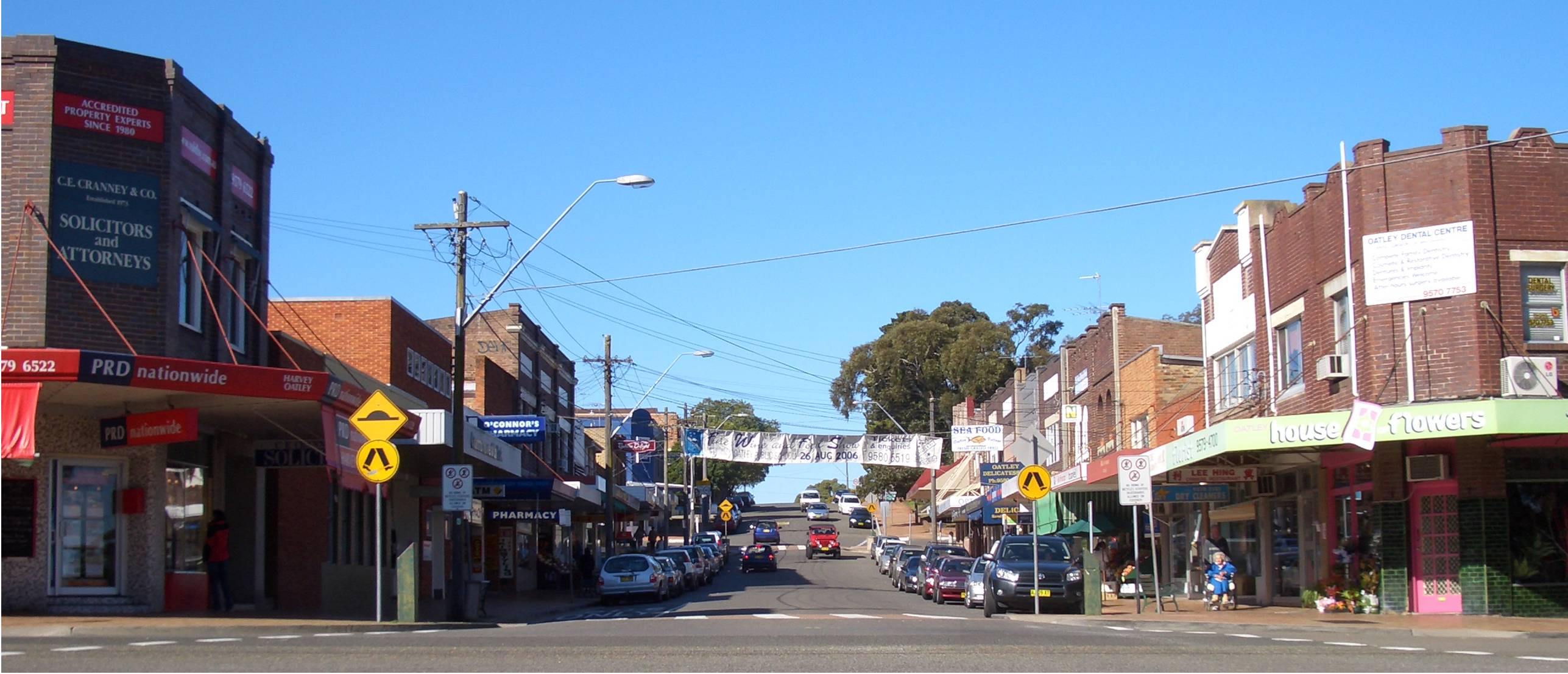
Frederick Street and Oatley Avenue intersection

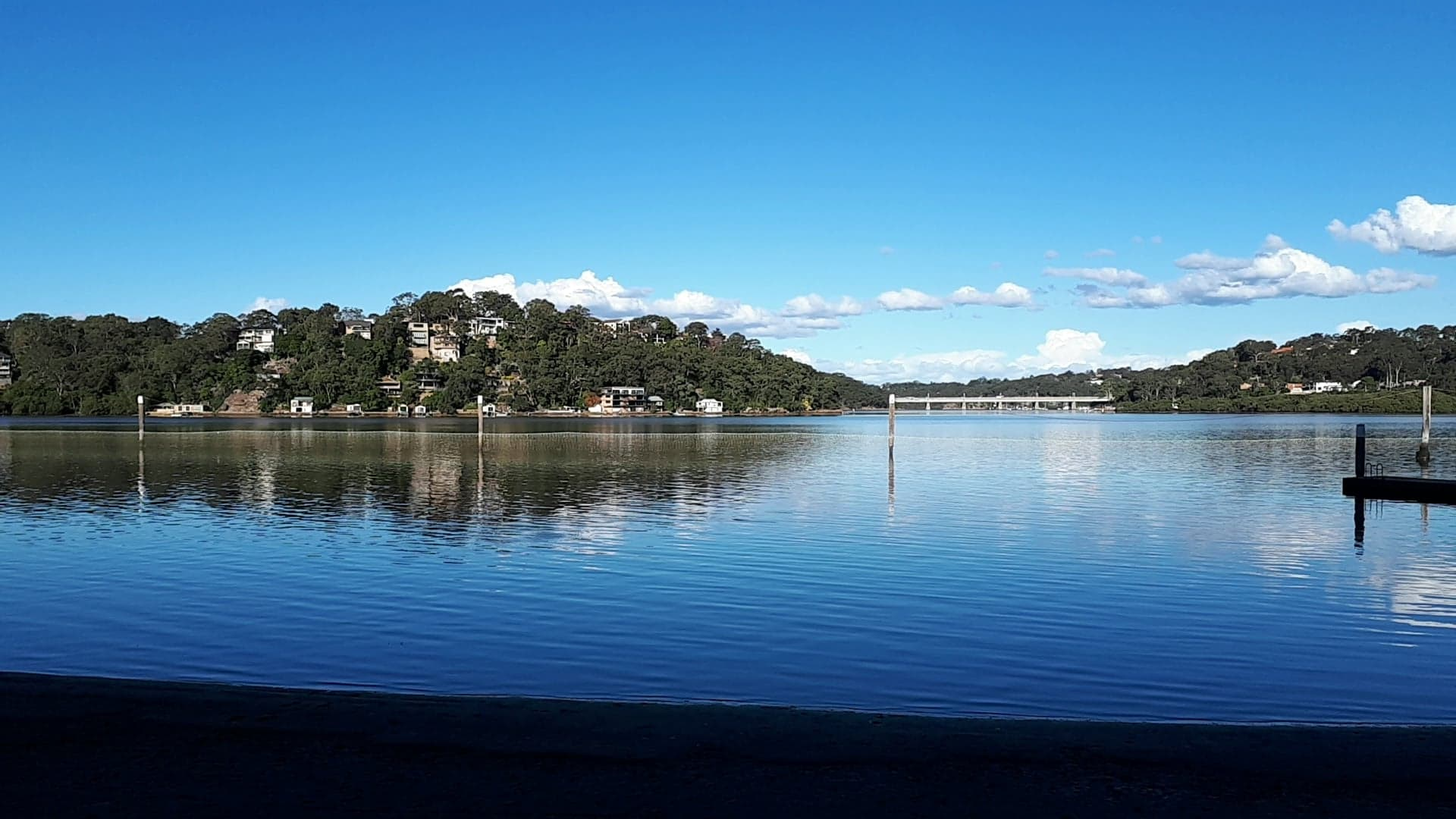
View from Oatley Park of Jewfish Bay

Oatley is a suburb in Southern Sydney in the state of New South Wales, Australia. It is located 18 kilometres (11 miles) south of the Sydney central business district and is part of the St George area. Oatley lies in the local government area of Georges River Council. It lies on the northern side of the tidal estuary of the Georges River and its foreshore includes part of Oatley Bay and Lime Kiln Bay, and all of Neverfail Bay, Gungah Bay and Jewfish Bay.

== History ==
=== Aboriginal history ===
The area now known as Oatley lies either on the traditional lands of Dharug people or coastal Eora people, both of whom spoke a common language. It lies close to the lands of Tharawal people, on the south bank of the river. Georges River Council acknowledges that the Biddegal/Bidjigal/Bedegal clan of the Eora are the original inhabitants and custodians of land and water in the Georges River region.

Evidence of Aboriginal occupation of the land now known as Oatley exists in the form of numerous shell middens and rock shelters near the shore of Georges River. Lime Kiln Bay once had more extensive shell middens, made over centuries by local people.

=== Settlement ===
One of the earliest contacts between British settlers and Aboriginal people occurred on 20 January 1788, just to the west of Oatley. Arthur Philip and Philip Gidley King, leading a party of seamen from the First Fleet rowing two open boats, explored the 'South-West Arm of Botany Bay' (now Georges River). They are now thought to have gone as far as Lime Kiln Bay, where they landed at two locations, thought to be just west of the boundaries of modern-day Oatley. Not finding enough freshwater, around Botany Bay and its two 'arms', the colonists moved on to Port Jackson, where the settlement of Sydney began six days later.

Bass and Flinders explored the Georges River in 1795 in Tom Thumb, and are believed to have landed at Neverfail Bay and obtained freshwater from a spring there.

Lime Kiln Bay takes its name from early settlers burning the shells from the once extensive Aboriginal middens there, to create lime.The kilns were located in what is now Oatley Park.

This suburb's name can be traced to James Oatley Snr, a convict clockmaker, who was transported to Botany Bay for life in 1814. Seven years later, in 1821, Governor Lachlan Macquarie granted Oatley a conditional pardon and appointed him overseer of the Town Clock for his work in installing the clock at Hyde Park Barracks.

James Oatley, Snr was granted land in what is now Oatley in 1833, although he never lived there. He called his land Needwood Forest. Oatley's land extended from Gungah Bay northward to what later became Hurstville Road and Boundary Road. It to passed to his eldest son Frederick Oatley, who sold it in 1881 to Charles Cecil Griffiths, who was buying up land along the new railway line, with his brother, Frederick Griffiths. James Oatley's second son, also James Oatley, became an early mayor of Sydney and member of the NSW Legislative Assembly.

The railway line running through Oatley was opened as far as Sutherland in December 1885. It included a major bridge crossing of the Georges River, from Oatley to Como. The first Oatley railway station opened in 1886; its construction said to have been a condition of the transfer of land from Charles Griffiths for the railway reservation.

The arrival of the railway led to the first residential subdivisions within the area of the original land grant. Many of the streets of the suburb were laid out in these subdivisions. Almost all of Oatley's streets to the east of the railway line, bear Victorian-era first names corresponding to members of the Griffiths family. The upper part of Wyong St, before it extended all the way to Neverfail Bay, was known as Cecil Street. There is also a Griffiths Street, west of the railway line.

Slightly predating the subdivisions of the Griffiths' land was a small hamlet on the flat land near the shore of Neverfail Bay, inhabited mainly by oyster farmers. In its earlier years, the hamlet was reportedly known, informally, as 'Thompsonville', the name of one of the oyster growing families.

On 17 August 1898, Oatley was the site of a pursuit and gun battle involving a party of police and George Peisley (or Peasley), a fugitive cattle and horse thief, who was using a sandstone cave on the eastern side of Gungah Bay as his hide out. Peisley escaped capture, but was arrested at Arncliffe on the following day and eventually sentenced to four years hard labour.

Spurred by invasion fears around the time of the Russo-Japanese War, in 1905, land around Neverfail Bay near the Como railway bridge was reserved for military purposes, but nothing was built there. In the same year, the railway line and station were relocated further west to the current alignment.

The post office opened in 1903, thus giving the district its official name of Oatley. Prior to this, the area west of the railway line was officially in the suburb of Hurstville and attached to the Hurstville Post Office with "Oatley's" in parentheses at the end of the address. Likewise, the streets east of the railway line were officially in the suburb of Kogarah and attached to the Kogarah Post Office. In the late 1890s both Hurstville and Kogarah were much larger suburbs and were later divided up into separate suburbs.

Oatley is notable as the terminus of the first railway electrification project in Sydney, which reached this station from Sydney Central in 1926. The first scheduled electric train service left Oatley station, at 5:18 am, on Sunday, 3 October 1926.

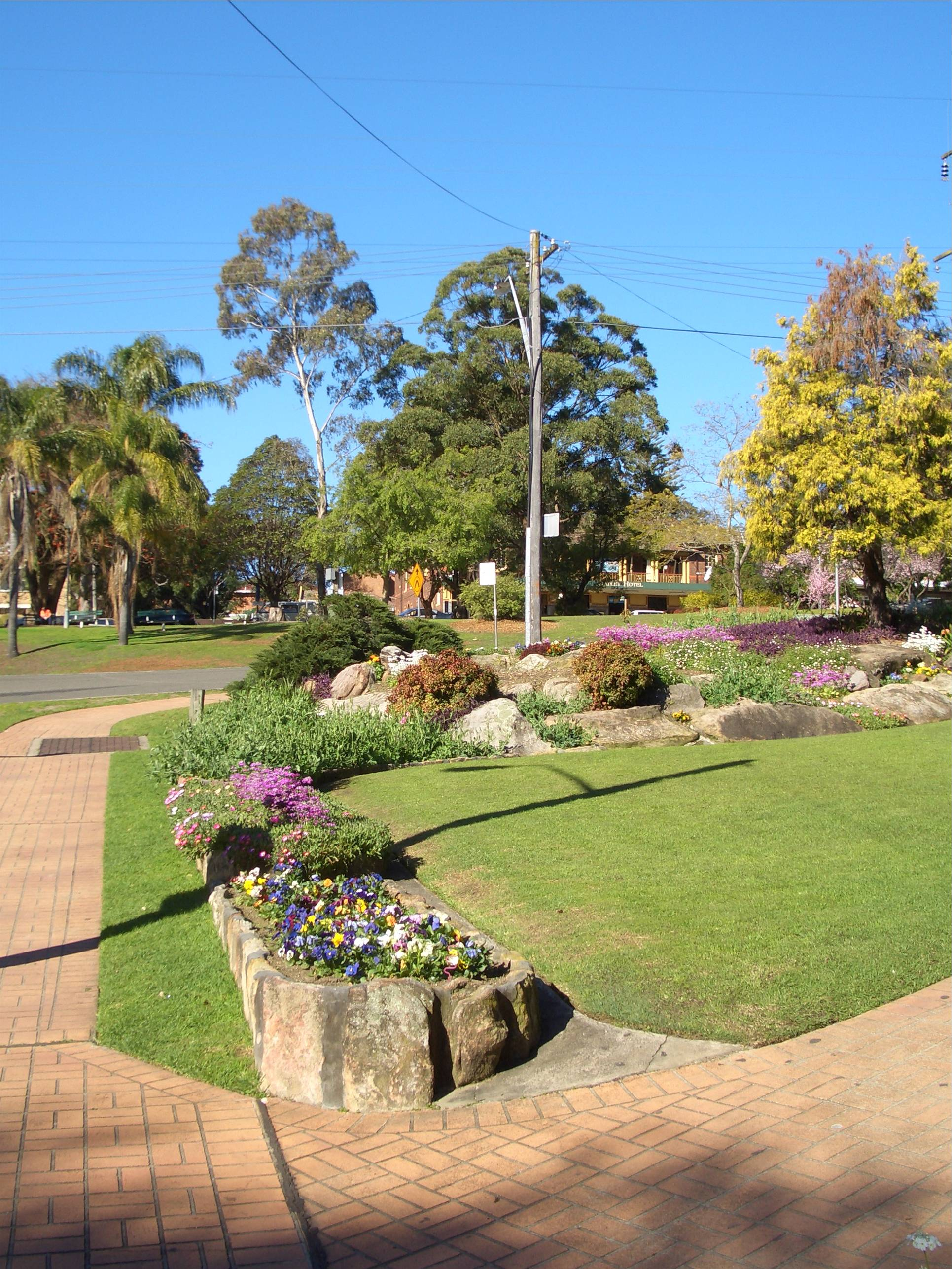
Oatley Parade

Following construction of the Woronora Dam, since 1942, the old Como railway bridge and the former railway reservation has been used by the main water pipeline from the dam to Penshurst. The pipeline is buried where it passes through the Oatley Memorial Gardens, but remains exposed in the old railway cutting south of Neville St.

In January 1946, the foreshore of Oatley Bay, near Russell Street, was the site of a horrific fatal shark attack, in shallow water. Large sharks have been sighted in the shallow bay, many times over the years, and dogs have been taken. Swimmers at Oatley Park and the Oatley Pleasure Grounds are protected by shark-proof enclosures.

Oatley had a strong association with the growing, and consumption, of Sydney Rock Oysters. In November 1953, an Oatley man won the title of oyster-eating champion of NSW, by consuming 26 dozen oysters in 30 minutes. The runner up, also from Oatley, pulled out after consuming 21 dozen oysters in 25 minutes. The contest took place in front of a crowd of 3,000, at Moorefields racecourse, Kogarah. In 1949, an Oatley woman was reported to have opened—the word 'shucked' was not as commonly used in those times—90 dozen oysters in an hour and a half, a sustained rate of a dozen a minute.

When a group gathered in Oatley Park in December 1959, to form a Bowling Club, it was inevitable that the founding members should choose a clock as the club emblem. The hands on the clock were set at 15 minutes after 10 - the precise time the first meeting of the Oatley Bowls Club was opened. The club has since closed, though the greens and Club premises remain.

The Oatley campus of Alexander Mackie College of Advanced Education opened in 1981 on the site of the former Judd's Brick Works and quarry. In 1981, when many teachers' colleges were amalgamated, it became The St George Institute of Education, part of Sydney College of Advanced Education, and subsequently a campus of the University of New South Wales. It is now a secondary school – the Oatley Senior Campus of the Georges River College.

Prior to the formation of Georges River Council, in 2016, the part of Oatley to the west of the railway line was in the City of Hurstville, and the part of Oatley to the east of the railway line was in the City of Kogarah.

=== Local industries ===
Although now an entirely residential suburb, Oatley was the site of various industries in the past.

==== Oyster farming ====
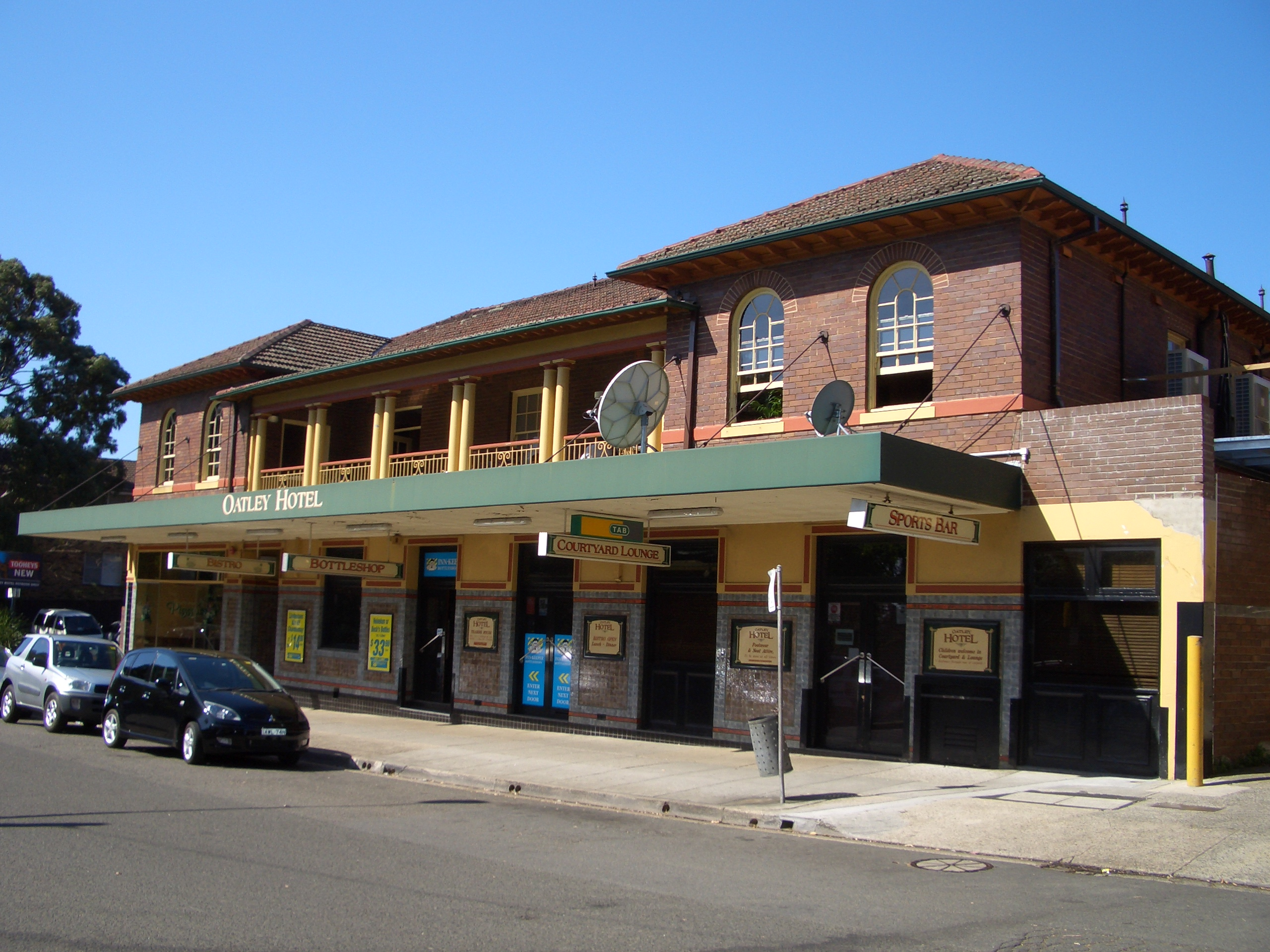
Oatley Hotel on Oatley Avenue. For many decades, its bar was frequented by local oyster farmers. Its bistro is named 'The Clock & Oyster'.

For over a century, Sydney Rock Oysters were grown commercially along the shores of Georges River at Oatley. Freshwater from the Woronora River, a tributary that joins the Georges River opposite Oatley, caused suitable growing conditions—clean water and slightly reduced salinity— for faster-growing, plump rock oysters. There is a significant freshwater component in the flow of the Georges River itself; at times a small standing wave develops across the narrow part of the river estuary, between Jewfish Point (Oatley) and the opposite southern shore (Illawong), when the flow of the Georges River meets the incoming flood tide. Salinity in the river increases downstream, and is suitable for oysters from around Soily Bottom Point, at Lugarno. Overall, conditions on the Georges River were once ideal for oyster farming. The river also had the advantage that it was the only oyster growing area within the suburban area of the largest market, and close to transport, even in earlier years.

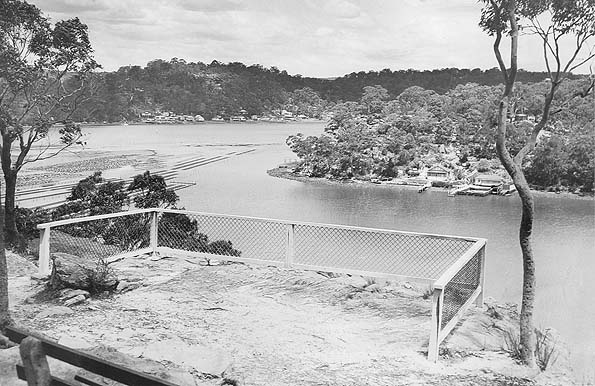
View of the mouth of Lime Kiln Bay, from Hills Lookout toward Illawong and Lugarno, showing former oyster farming racks on left (date unknown).

Six families of oyster farmers worked from the head of Neverfail Bay just to the east of the Como Railway Bridge. Neverfail Bay was the base for working oyster leases both upstream and downstream on the Georges River. There was a smaller oyster farming site at the head of Jewfish Bay just outside the eastern boundary of Oatley Park. Modern-day oyster shell 'middens' and a few decaying remnants of oyster farming still existed at these locations in 2021. Oysters were cultivated on racks, or on artificially created shell banks or rock beds, that were installed on river mudbanks and, west of the Como rail bridge, on the rocks of shoreline leases. For many years, oysters were shipped to market in hessian sacks—each sack containing around 100 dozen oysters—from Oatley railway station, by electric rail parcel vans. There was also long-standing and lucrative criminal activity involving the theft of oysters from leases. In late 1934, shots were fired at oyster poachers by police patrolling the leases. Oyster farmers would at times patrol their leases themselves, at night, using boats fitted with small searchlights to scan their leases.

==== Decline and end of oyster farming ====
The industry on the Georges River reached its productive peak in the 1970s. In the financial year 1976-1977, the river produced 2,563 tonnes of oysters, over a quarter of the record statewide production total of 9,375 tonnes.

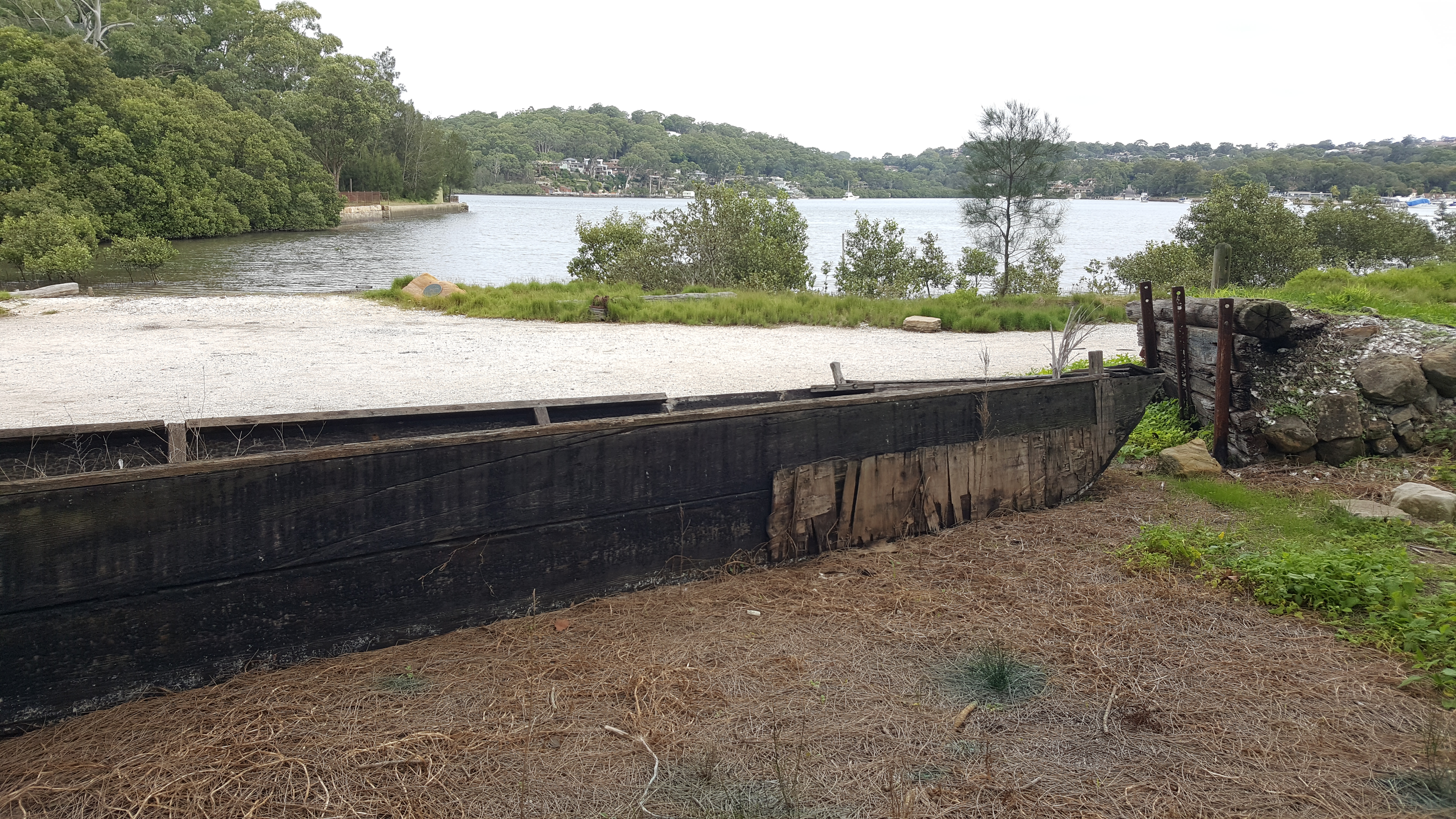
Derelict oyster barge and loading ramp, at Neverfail Bay, Oatley (April 2019)

The local oyster farming industry survived opposition from Georges River Oyster Lease Protest Association (GROLPA), Kogarah Council and—to a lesser extent—Hurstville Council, reduced freshwater flows from the Woronora River, impacts of Tributyltin (TBT) anti-fouling compound for boats, invasive wild Pacific Oysters, increasing urbanisation, river silting, and increasing water turbidity and pollution.

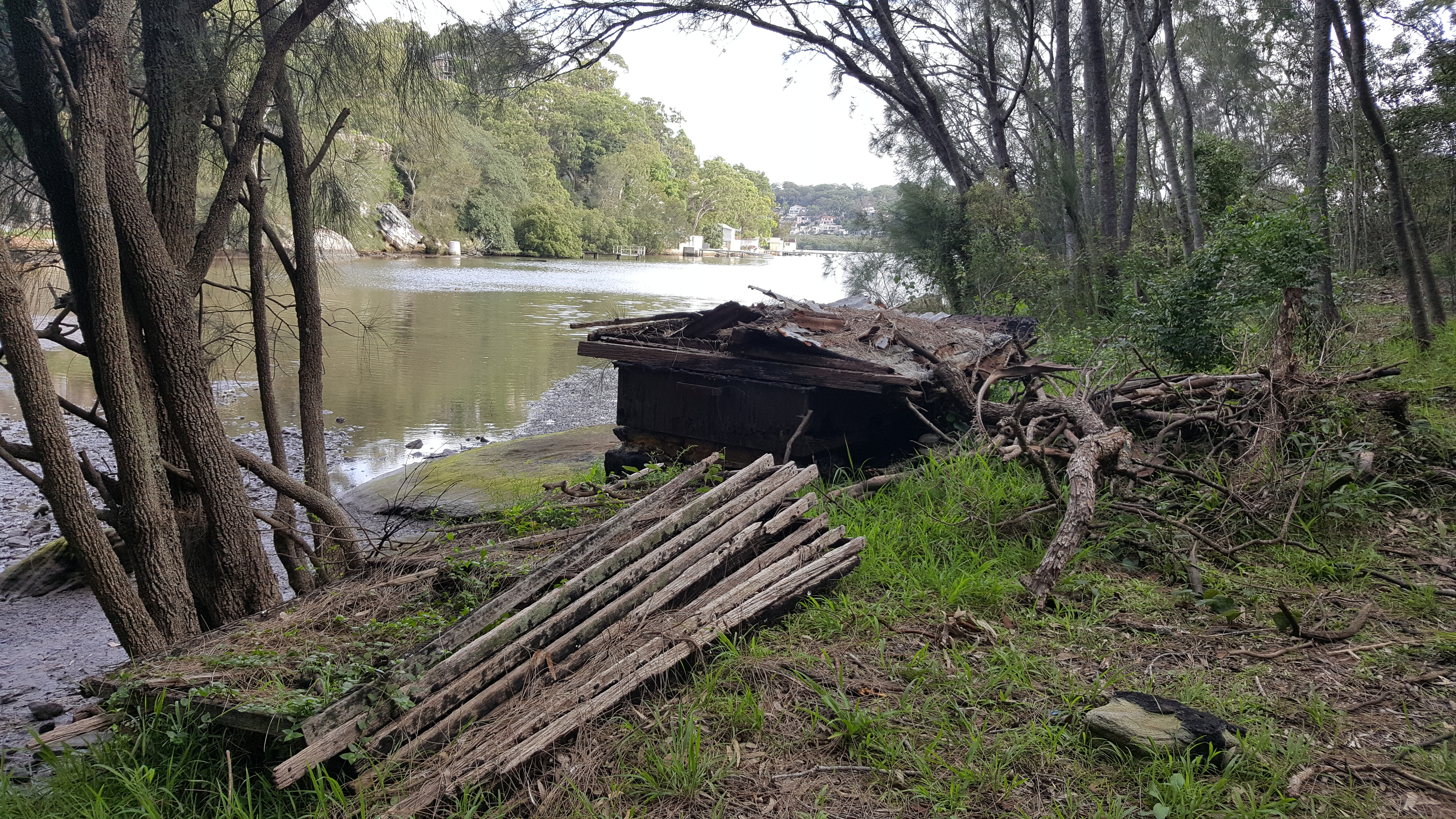
Oyster trays and tar tank at the abandoned oyster farming site on Jewfish Bay, Oatley (April 2019).

After a major gastroenteritis event that was traced to Georges River oysters, in 1978, harvesting was suspended after heavy rain events, water quality tested regularly, and oysters were subjected to 36 to 48-hours of filtration and ultra-violet exposure in a small cooperative facility at Neverfail Bay. Changes to the sewage system were also made, with discharges from upstream sewage plants at Glenfield and Liverpool redirected to the ocean outfall at Malabar. Despite these precautions and improvements, there was another food poisoning event in May 1990, when Sydney Water failed to advise Georges River oyster farmers of a large sewage overflow upstream, which occurred after a satisfactory water quality test. Sales were banned for a period. The timing was bad, because Georges River oysters dominated the market from April to August. Such events damaged the reputation of oysters from the river, causing consumers to shun Georges River oysters.

In 1992, there was a catastrophic outbreak of 'winter mortality', a poorly-understood seasonal disease caused by a protozoan parasite, Mikiocytos roughleyi. The oyster farmers at Oatley had limited the impact of winter mortality, by moving their oysters on trays, to more sheltered waters with lower salinity, such as near the Woronora River confluence and Bonnet Bay, and then placing the trays on racks higher in the intertidal zone. This 'wintering' method—first proposed by noted oyster zoologist, Theodore Roughley, in the 1920s—was not effective, in 1992, with the Georges River oyster harvest down by 70%.

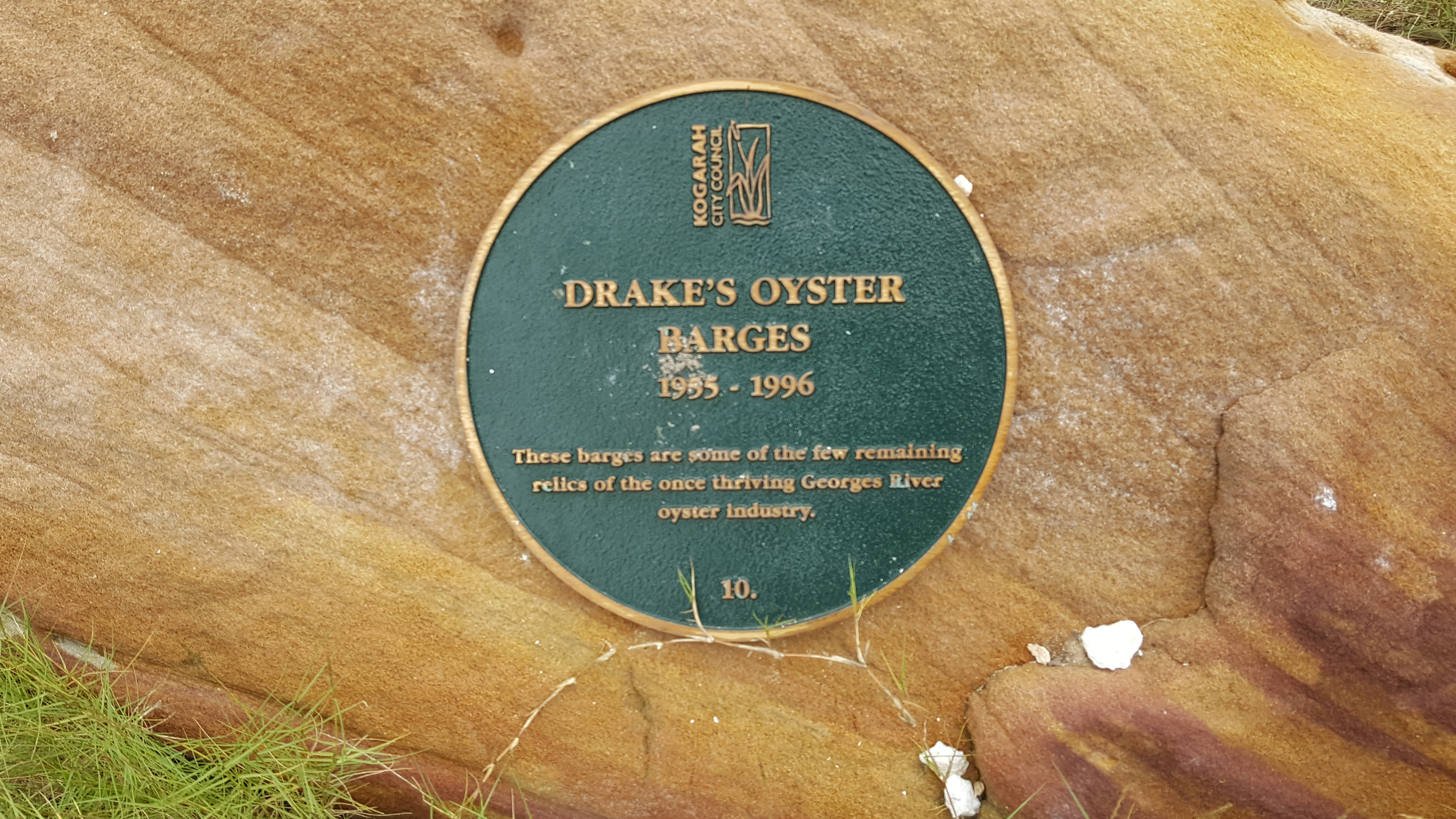
A reminder of the lost oyster farming industry, at Neverfail Bay.

Oyster farming at Oatley finally succumbed in the mid-1990s, to the spread of 'QX disease'. QX is caused by a protozoan parasite, Marteilia sydneyi, which affects Sydney Rock Oysters. When it first appeared in the river in 1994, it wiped out 90% of the farmed oysters. Effects of QX were worst in parts of the river with lower salinity. QX-resistant oyster strains came too late to save most of the Georges River industry. There was still some oyster farming activity at Neverfail Bay, as late as 1999, but it did not last.

There are now no oyster leases at or near Oatley. One of the old families later farmed oysters downstream, at Woolooware Bay, but sold that lease in 2013. By 2023, the last operating oyster farmer at Woolooware Bay had been forced to close, and the future of that last oyster-growing site in the Georges River estuary was uncertain.

==== Judd's Hurstville Brickworks ====
Judd's Hurstville Brickworks was located on the northern side of Hurstville Road; its 13-hectare site straddled the northern boundary of Oatley with neighbouring Mortdale. It was established by William George Judd (1847—1929). It operated from 1884 to 1972, making bricks using shale from a quarry that occupied much of the Oatley end of the site. Two tall brick chimneys were demolished in June 1973, along with the brick-making plant and kilns, and the company went into voluntary liquidation. The brickworks once had its own railway siding. Fifteen brick cottages were built along the western side of Judd Street, just across the boundary between Mortdale and Oatley, to rent to workers at the brickworks; some still survive.

==== Factories ====
A factory owned by Albert Page, which once existed on the south-eastern corner of Rosa Street and Hurstville Road, manufactured vehicle number plates from 1935 to the 1950s. The Quill paper products factory was later on the same site. Surelli Furniture Pty Ltd operated a factory on the western side of Ada Street near the junction with Hurstville Road, until the late 1980s. Both these factory sites are now occupied by medium-density housing. The Cuthbertson family ran a small factory making children's and babies' shoes, behind their residence at 46 Rosa Street, from after WWI until 1959 when they moved the factory to a site in Mortdale.

=== Local environmental activism ===
As well as having been the home of prominent conservation campaigners, Myles and Milo Dunphy, Oatley has one of the longest-lived local conservation groups in Sydney, the Oatley Flora and Fauna Conservation Society (OFF). It was founded in 1955 and is still active. Up to the 1970s, land at the heads of both Oatley Bay—where Moore Reserve was created—and Lime Kiln Bay was being reclaimed in mangrove forests, with upper Lime Kiln Bay being used as a landfill tip. Paradoxically, much of the mangrove growth at Lime Kiln Bay (and in Gungah Bay) was a sign of earlier ecological disturbance, as landward expansion of mangrove forests had taken over, between 1930 and 1970, much of what had previously been an extensive salt marsh habitat.

OFF successfully led campaigns to end reclamation, on both Oatley and Lime Kiln bays. They allied with local oyster farmers—concerned about contaminated water leaching from the tips and affecting water quality in the river—and other local conservation societies to achieve the outcome. Subsequently, artificial wetlands were created at both bays to improve the water quality of runoff into the river.

== Heritage listings ==
Oatley has a number of heritage-listed sites, including:

- Illawarra railway: Oatley railway station
- over Georges River: Old Como railway bridge
- Residential building: 92 Rosa Street, Oatley.

== Commercial area ==
The main shopping centre is located on Oatley Avenue and Frederick Street, near the railway station. A group of shops and a Coles Supermarket are located along the southern side of Mulga Road, between Waratah and Myall Streets, which are referred to as the Oatley West shops. A third group of shops at the intersection of Baker Street and Lansdowne Parade—in the locality of Jewfish Point—is now mainly converted to non-retail businesses.

== Transport ==
Originally, the railway ran east of the present Mortdale Railway Sheds and down the western side of Oatley Avenue, on land that is now the Oatley Memorial Gardens. The first station platform was located at the western end of Frederick Street and extended north to opposite what is now the Oatley Hotel car park. The railway was realigned and the current station opened in 1905. The electrification of the passenger network began in 1926 with the first suburban electric services running between Sydney's Central Station and Oatley.

Oatley railway station is the last station on the Sydney Trains Eastern Suburbs & Illawarra railway line before crossing the Georges River to Como in the Sutherland Shire. The 955 bus route operates a service from Mortdale through Oatley West and Oatley to Hurstville.

== Parks ==
The area's main attraction is Oatley Park but there are also a number of local bush parks surrounding the suburb: Oatley Point Reserve, Oatley Pleasure Grounds, Moore Reserve, Renown Park, Lime Kiln Bay Bushland Sanctuary, Giriwa Picnic Ground, Stevens Reserve, Meyer Reserve, and the Myles Dunphy Bushland Reserve (in which foot tracks were improved in 2011, by Hurstville Council). They attract many birds both native and introduced, with Oatley Park alone recording 146 species; as many as 90 recently.

=== Oatley Park ===
Oatley Park is a tree covered promontory that is almost completely surrounded by the Georges River. It covers an area of about 45 hectares (110 acres) and it is one of the significant areas of bushland remaining in the St George area.

Oatley Park became a public recreation area on 25 March 1887. In October 1893, when the nearby residential subdivision was sold off, it was known as Peakhurst Park. It was renamed to Oatley Park in March 1922.

It protects important examples of the natural environment which occur throughout the park. In addition, there is a swimming area, a playground featuring an old steamroller, lookouts, barbecues, a soccer/cricket oval, and a "castle". The man-made wetlands of Lime Kiln Bay Reserve which adjoin Oatley Park provide refuge for bird species such as chestnut teal, Pacific black ducks, dusky moorhens and purple swamphens. Native mammals which are uncommon in the region can still be found within the park, including the short-beaked echidna and the swamp wallaby.

=== Oatley Pleasure Grounds ===
Oatley Pleasure Grounds is a bush park located on Annette Street. It covers an area of 3.4 hectares (8.4 acres) and was started by Harry Linmark around 1896 and it hosted tea rooms, a bar and various events during his ownership. After Linmark died in 1931 the land was then sold to Council in 1931 who created the public pleasure grounds.

== Schools ==
- Oatley Public School
- Oatley West Public School
- St Joseph's Catholic School
- Georges River College Oatley Senior Campus

== Churches ==
- All Saints' Anglican Church
- St Joseph's Catholic Church
- OAC Oatley Anglican Church (former St Paul's Anglican church merged with St Aidan's church, Hurstville Grove in 2026)
- Mortdale-Oatley Baptist Church (MOBC)
- Oatley Uniting Church
- Oatley Christian Brethren Church
- Hurstville District Christadelphian Ecclesia

== Landmarks ==
- Oatley RSL & Community Club; its art-deco style youth club building was formerly the Oatley Radio Theatre (from 1940 to 1962)
- Oatley Clock Tower
- Oatley Bay, Gungah Bay, Lime Kiln Bay, Neverfail Bay, Jewfish Bay
- Oatley Point, Lime Kiln Point, Lime Kiln Head, Jewfish Bay Point
- Hills Lookout, Websters Lookout
- The Oatley Hotel (Oatley Pub)
- Oatley Library
- Myles Dunphy Reserve, a site of ecological significance. However, Hurstville City Council has plans to sell off a large part of this land to private business.
- The 1905 George Fincham Pipe Organ located at Hurstville Christadelphian District Ecclesia is a historically-significant musical instrument in the area.

== Community events ==
- Oatley Lions Village Festival – An annual festival held on the third Saturday in October in Oatley Memorial Gardens and part of Frederick Street
- Oatley West Arts and Crafts Festival – An event held at Oatley West Public school each year
- Oatley Spring Fair – A fair held biennially at Oatley Public School

== Sport ==
Water sports and recreation are a way of life in the peninsula suburb of Oatley whose eastern, southern and western boundaries are formed by the Georges River and its bays. Oatley has many sporting teams and sporting fields:

- Renown United, the local Rugby league team, play at Renown Park.
- Oatley Rugby Club, play Rugby Union at H.V Evatt Park in Lugarno.
- Oatley RSL, who play at Renown Park, and All Saints Oatley West, who play at Oatley Park, are the two association football teams.
- Oatley Netball Club.
- Oatley RSL Youth Club Gymnastics and Sport Aerobics

== Demographics ==
According to the 2021 census, there were 10,664 people in Oatley. 71.1% of people were born in Australia. The next most common countries of birth were China 6.6%, England 2.6%, Hong Kong 1.6%, New Zealand 1.0% and North Macedonia 0.9%. 70.1% of people only spoke English at home. Other languages spoken at home included Mandarin 7.4%, Cantonese 4.5%, Greek 2.9%, Croatian 1.7% and Macedonian 1.6%. The most common responses for religious affiliation were No Religion 32.5%, Catholic 25.6%, Anglican 13.8% and Eastern Orthodox 7.2%.

== Notable residents ==
- Graeme Bradley, rugby league player
- Myles Joseph Dunphy (1891—1985), architect and conservationist
- Milo Kanangra Dunphy (1928–1996), the son of Myles Dunphy, and also an architect and conservationist
- Fiona Margaret Hall, artistic photographer and sculptor
- Jonathan Harris, sailor
- John Kachoyan, writer, dramaturg
- Ray Lawless, rugby league player
- Ian McNamara, ABC radio presenter of Australia All Over, grew up in Oatley
- John O'Grady, humorist and author of They're a Weird Mob

== Bibliography ==
- Sands and MacDougall Post Office Directory of Sydney (various years)
