= Hurstville Grove =

- Suburb
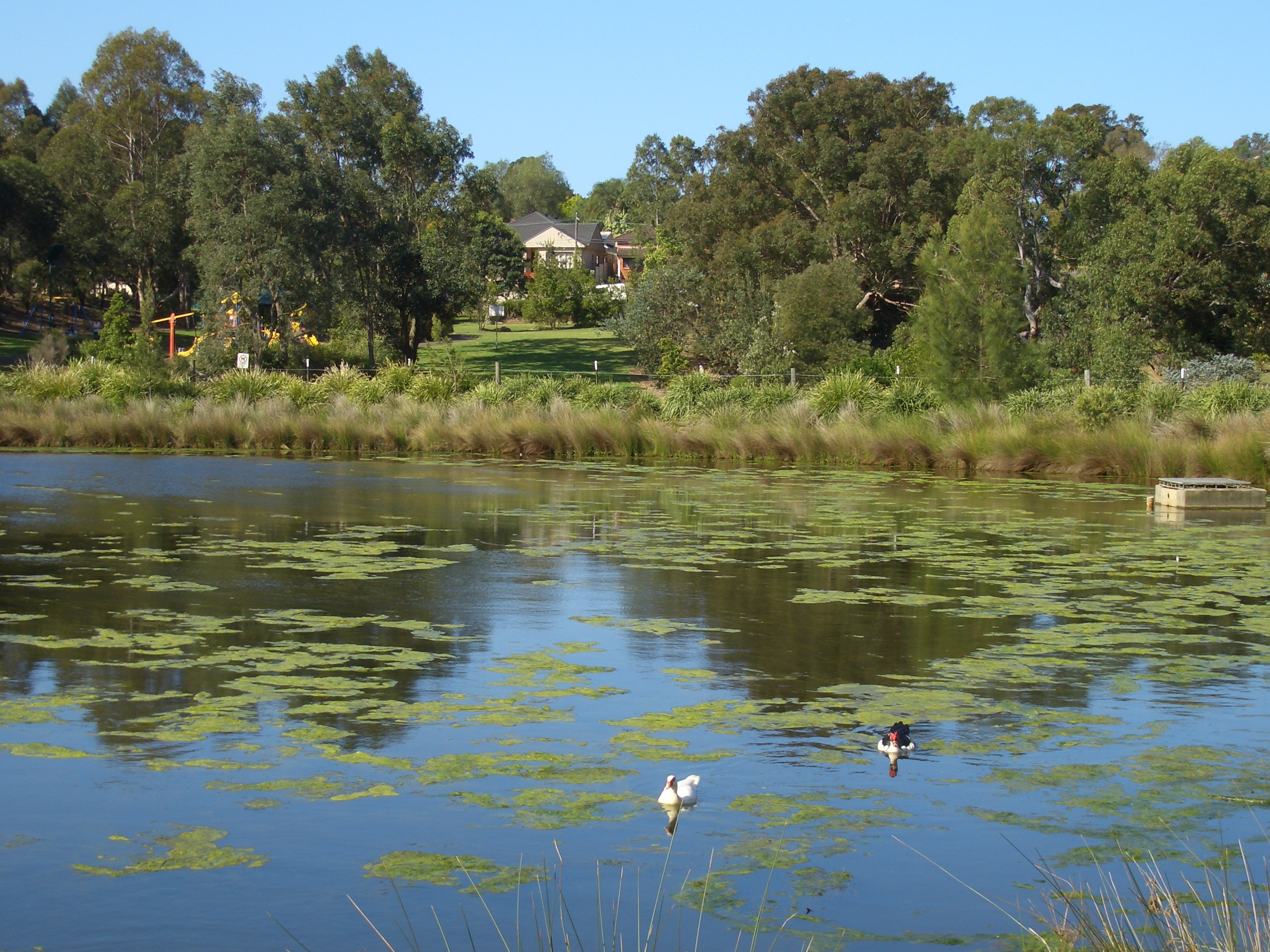
- Hurstville Grove, Moore Reserve Wetland

- Interactive map of Hurstville Grove
- Coordinates: 33°58′47″S 151°5′35″E
- Country: Australia
- State: New South Wales
- City: Sydney
- LGA: Georges River Council
- Location: 19 km (12 mi) south of Sydney CBD

Government
  - State electorate: Oatley
  - Federal division: Banks
- Elevation: 42 m (138 ft)

Population
  - Total: 2,606 (2021 census)
- Postcode: 2220
Suburbs around Hurstville Grove
Penshurst	Penshurst	Hurstville
Oatley	Hurstville Grove	South Hurstville
Oatley	Connells Point	Connells Point

Hurstville Grove is a suburb in southern Sydney, in the state of New South Wales, Australia. It is located 19 kilometres south of the Sydney central business district and is part of the local government area of the Georges River Council, in the St George area.

Hurstville Grove stretches from Hillcrest Avenue to the shore of Oatley Bay, on the Georges River. It is mainly residential with a few shops located on Hillcrest Avenue. Hurstville and South Hurstville are separate suburbs located to the northeast.

== History ==
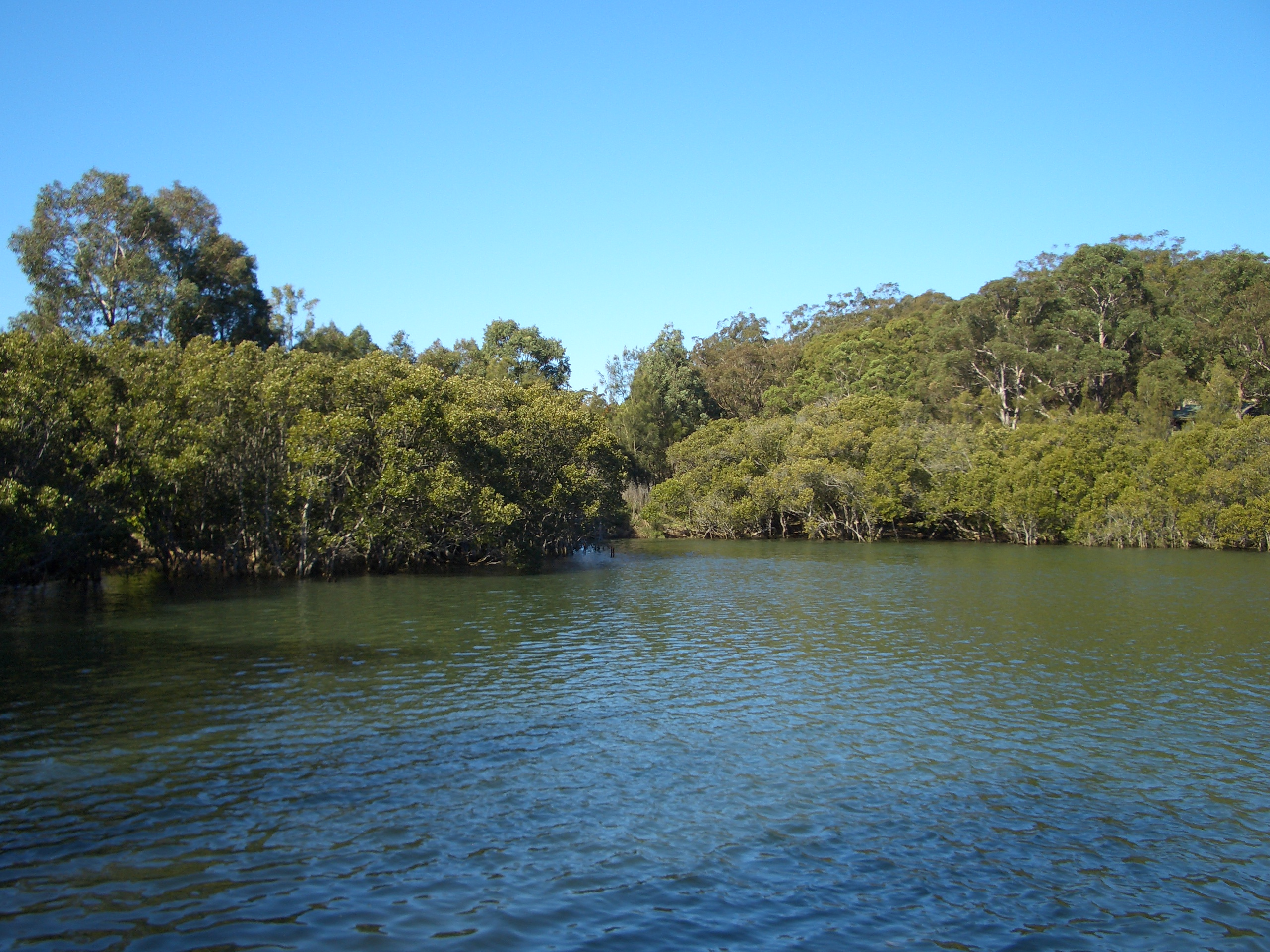
Hurstville Grove, view from Oatley Bay

The Hurstville area was granted to Captain John Townson and his brother Robert Townson in 1808; Captain Townson was granted 1,950 acres (7.9 km^{2}) which was on the land now occupied by the suburb of Hurstville and parts of Bexley, while Robert was granted the land which is now occupied by Penshurst, Mortdale, and parts of Peakhurst. The next year, Captain Townson was granted an additional 250 acres (1.0 km^{2}) in the area now occupied by Kingsgrove and Beverly Hills. The Townson brothers, however, were not happy with the heavily timbered land that they were given because it was not suitable for the farming of sheep for wool; consequently, it is likely that the brothers never occupied their land.

The land was sold to a wealthy merchant named Simeon Lord (1771–1840) in 1812, who called his land Lord's Bush. When Simeon Lord died, the land became the property of John Rose Holden and James Holt of the Bank of N.S.W.

The land was sold to Michael Gannon (1800–61) in 1850 and became known as Gannon's Forest. The Gannon's Forest post office opened in 1881. The local school was known as Hurstville by School Inspector MacIntyre in 1876. When the railway arrived in 1884, the station took the name "Hurstville" from the school. Hurstville municipality was incorporated in 1887.

== Churches ==
- St Aidan's Anglican Church

== Parks and waterways ==
- Poulton Park, Willunga Reserve, Moore Park, Grove Park, Quarry Reserve
- Oatley Bay, part of the Georges River waterway

== Population ==
According to the 2021 census, there were 2,606 residents in Hurstville Grove. 39.2% stated they were born overseas with the top countries of birth being China 12.3%, Hong Kong 2.6%, Greece 1.9%, Croatia 1.7% and England 1.6%. English was stated as the only language spoken at home by 47.0% of residents and the most common other languages spoken were Mandarin 12.8%, Cantonese 9.1%, Greek 8.8%, Arabic 4.4% and Macedonian 2.8%. The most common responses for religious affiliation were No Religion 28.2%, Catholic 23.7%, Orthodox 17.5%, Anglican 7.9% and Islam 3.6%.
