= Oatley Pleasure Grounds =

Park in Australia

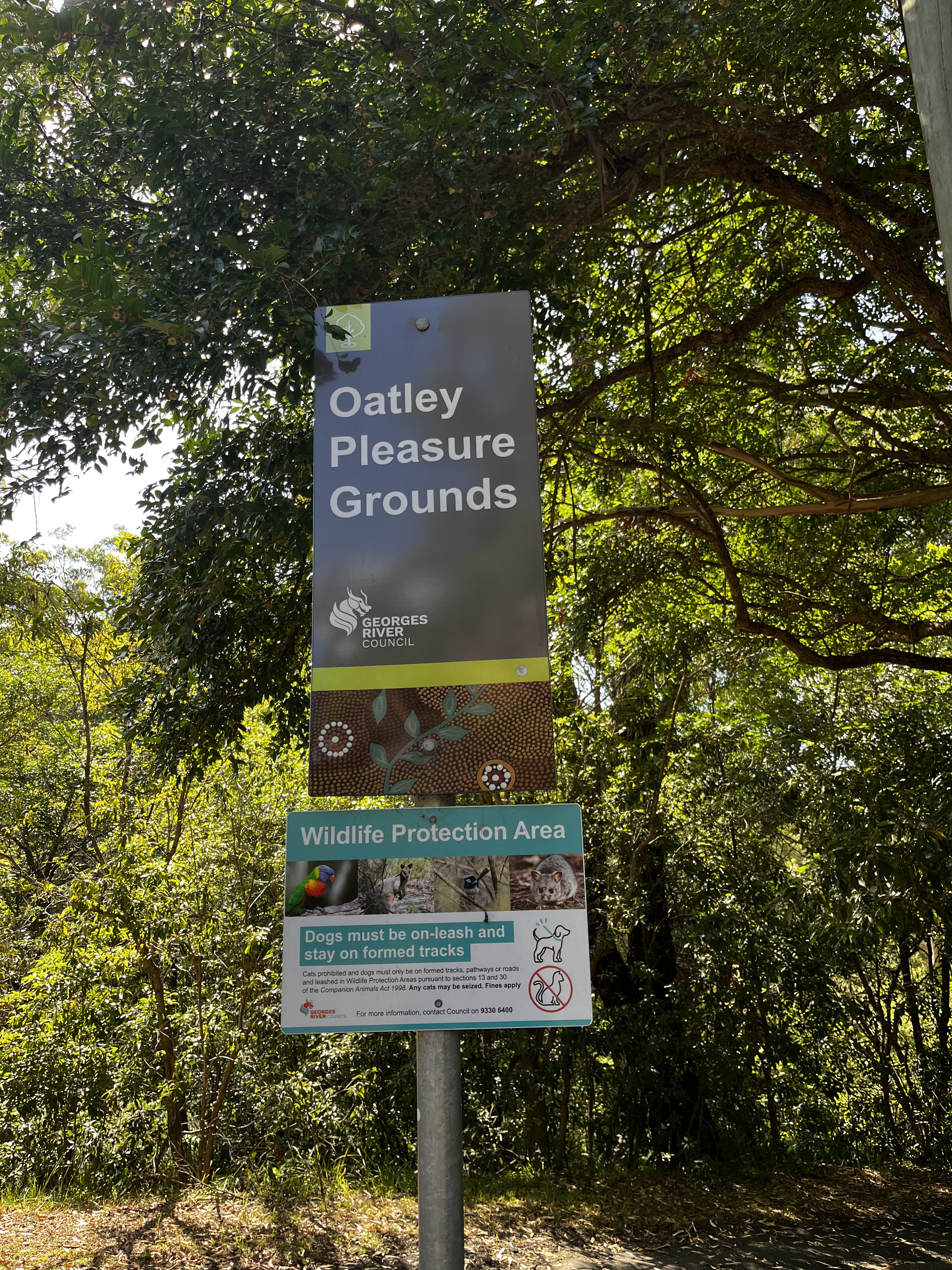
- The park is located off Annette Street

- Location within New South Wales
- Type: Public park
- Nearest city: Sydney
- Coordinates: 33°59′12″S 151°05′02″E
- Created: 1934
- Operator: Kogarah City Council
- Status: Open all year

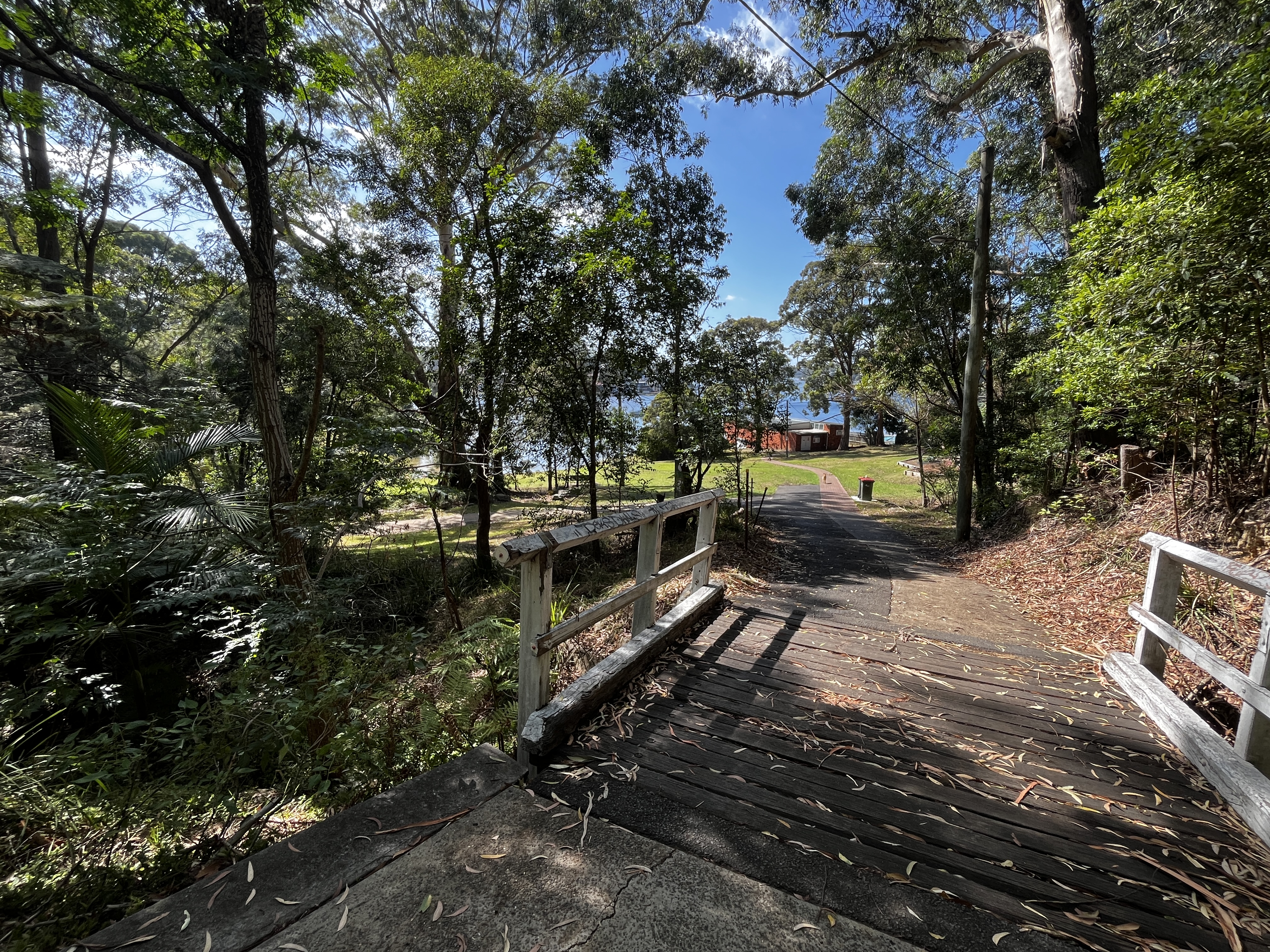
The bridge at Oatley Pleasure Grounds, 2025

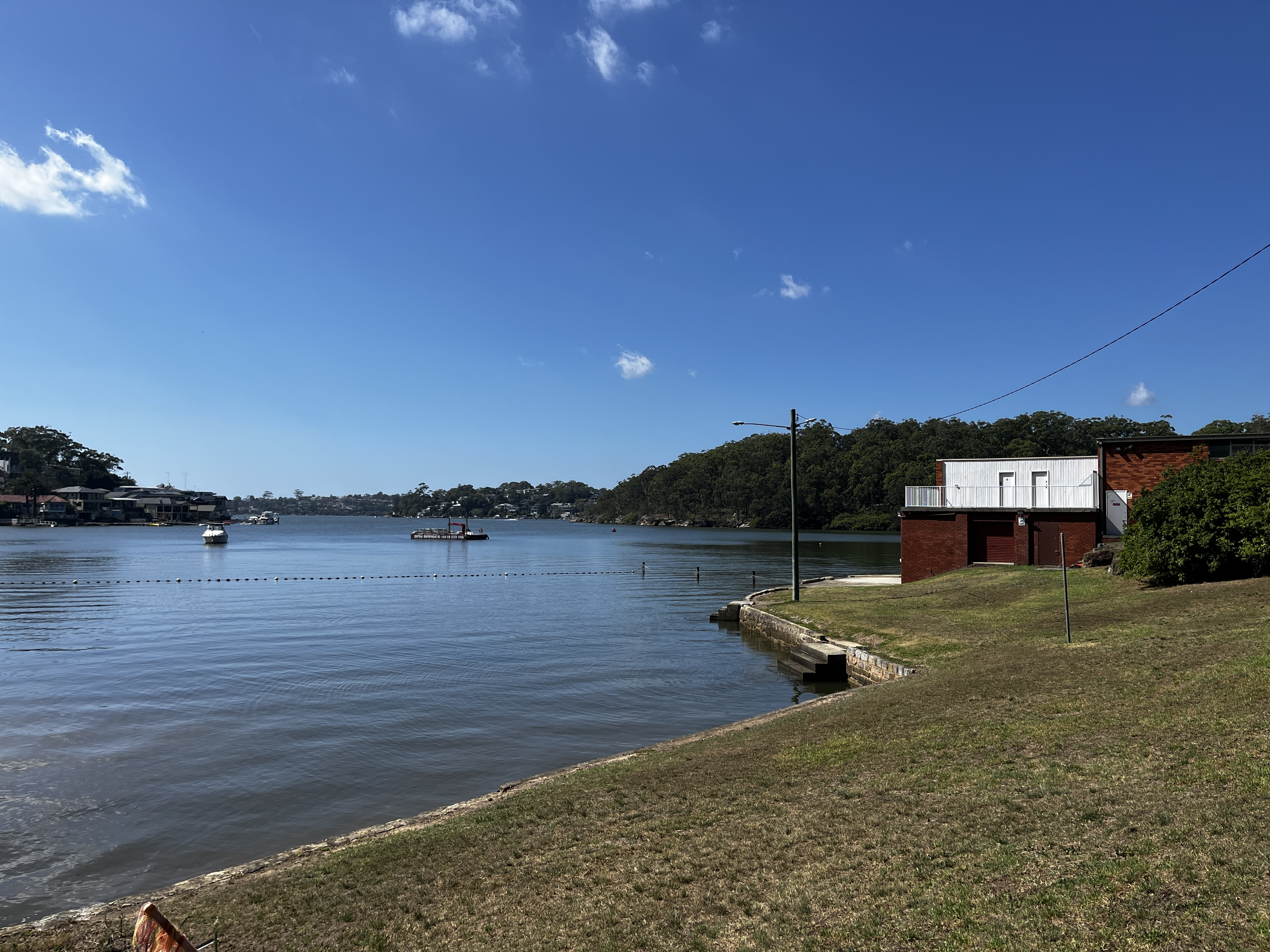
The 1st Oatley Bay Sea Scouts building at Oatley Pleasure Grounds, 2025

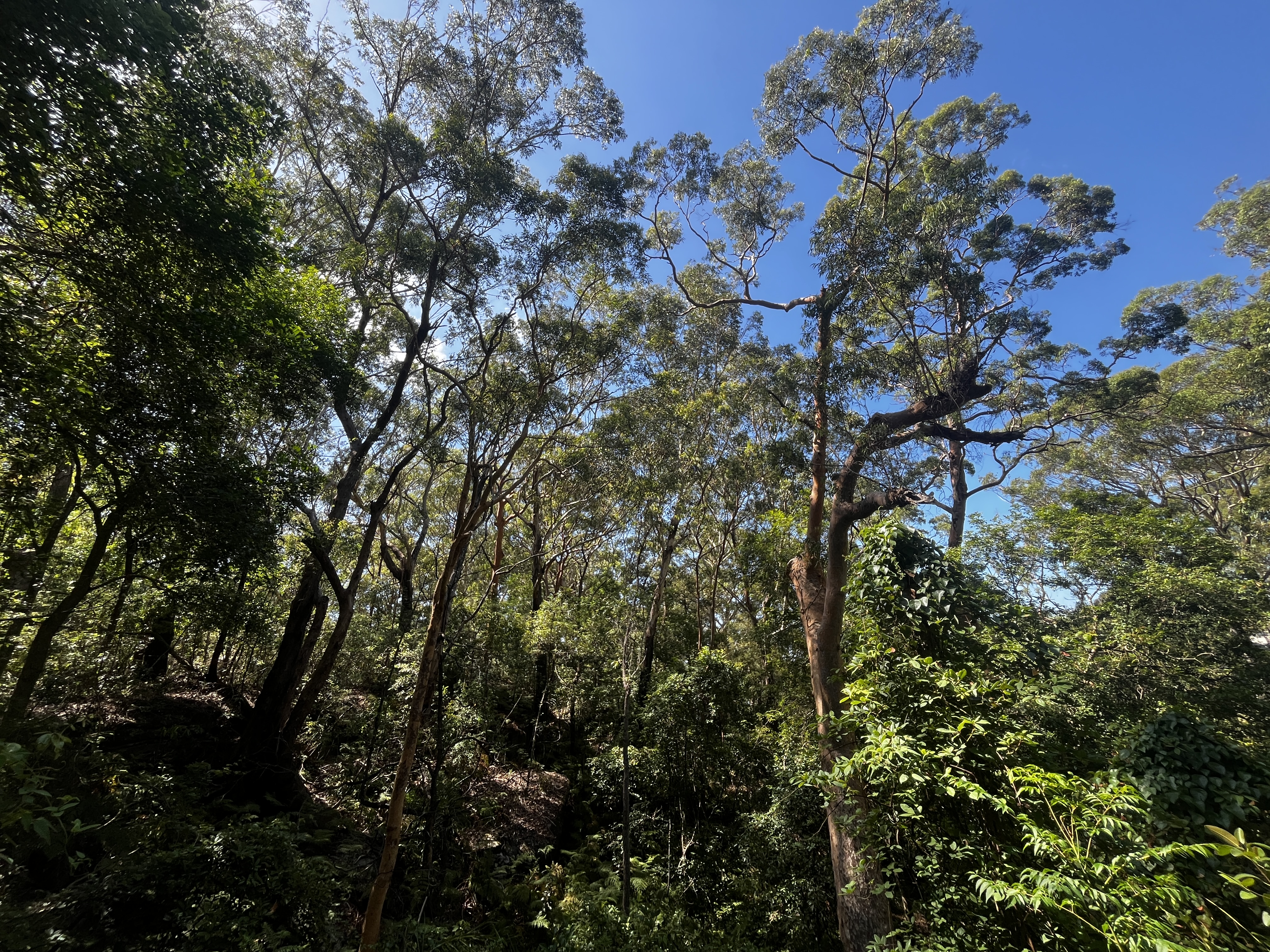
Bushland at the Oatley Pleasure Grounds, 2025

Oatley Pleasure Grounds is a bush park located in Oatley, New South Wales and it is located on Oatley Bay. The park is 3.4 hectares (8.4 acres) an sits within the Georges River Council.

== History ==
The pleasure grounds were started as a private park which was created by Harry Linmark from around 1896 when he constructed a boatshed there, known as Oatley Bay Boatshed, and offered houses for sale there. By 1906 Limark was selling alcohol there and, over the following years, it also hosted tea rooms, a bar, a swimming club and hosted various events including bands, Chinese New Year celebrations and picnics hosted by the Salvation Army were held in the park. A zoo was constructed in the park which held animals, such as kangaroos, monkeys, snakes and emus.

The pleasure grounds also hosted various boating clubs including the Oatley Bay Motor Boat Club (from 1927) and the Oatley Bay Rowing Club.

Major changed were seen after the death of Linmark in 1931 and in 1935 the land was sold to Council and, following their acquisition, the houses and other buildings where removed in the 1940s. In 1941 the 1st Oatley Bay Sea Scouts established themselves at the pleasure grounds and, in 1961, constructed boat sheds there.

== Features ==
Oatley Pleasure Grounds has the following features:

- The park can be accessed through a designated walking path.
- There is a designated swimming area surrounded by a net.
- The park extends to a very sandy area when the tide is low.
- Views of Oatley Bay and the Georges River.

== See also ==
- Moore Reserve, Oatley
- Oatley Point Reserve
- Parks in Sydney
