= Ray Lawless (rugby league, born 1930) =

Australian rugby league footballer

Personal information
- Full name: Raymond Leonard Lawless
- Born: 1930
- Died: 31 July 2009 (aged 78–79); Oatley, New South Wales

Playing information
- Weight: 14 st 3 lb (90 kg)
- Position: Second-row
Club
Years	Team	Pld	T	G	FG	P
1951	St. George	3	0	0	0	0

Ray Lawless (1930-2009) was an Australian rugby league footballer who played in the 1950s in the NSWRFL competition.

Ray was graded at the St. George in 1949, and won a premiership with the Dragons Third Grade team in 1949., Lawless had a brief career at the club, playing first grade in the year 1951. Injuries ruined his playing career, and he retired soon after.

Raymond Leonard Lawless died on 31 July 2009 at Oatley, New South Wales.
