= Electoral results for the district of Oatley =

Election results for Oatley, New South Wales, Australia

Oatley, an electoral district of the Legislative Assembly in the Australian state of New South Wales, has had two incarnations, the first from 1927 to 1930, the second from 2007 to the present.

== Members for Oatley ==
First incarnation (1927–1930)
Election	Member	Party
1927	Mark Gosling	Labor
Second incarnation (2007–present)
Election	Member	Party
2007	Kevin Greene	Labor
2011	Mark Coure	Liberal
2015	Mark Coure	Liberal
2019	Mark Coure	Liberal
2023	Mark Coure	Liberal

== Election results ==
=== Elections in the 2020s ===
==== 2023 ====
2023 New South Wales state election: Oatley
Party	Candidate	Votes	%	±%
Liberal	Mark Coure	22,877	45.6	−5.3
Labor	Ash Ambihaipahar	19,851	39.5	+3.8
Greens	Taylor Vandijk	3,101	6.2	−0.3
Independent	Natalie Mort	2,677	5.3	+5.3
Sustainable Australia	Glenn Hunt	1,690	3.4	+3.4
Total formal votes		50,196	96.9	+0.2
Informal votes		1,625	3.1	−0.2
Turnout		51,821	90.4	−2.4
Two-party-preferred result
Liberal	Mark Coure	23,959	50.8	−6.0
Labor	Ash Ambihaipahar	23,205	49.2	+6.0
Liberal hold		Swing	−6.0	

=== Elections in the 2010s ===
==== 2019 ====
2019 New South Wales state election: Oatley
Party	Candidate	Votes	%	±%
Liberal	Mark Coure	26,311	54.68	+3.53
Labor	Lucy Mannering	15,767	32.77	−3.67
Greens	Gianluca Dragone	3,080	6.40	−1.03
One Nation	Mark Preston	2,165	4.50	+4.50
Shooters, Fishers, Farmers	Raphael Bongomin	797	1.66	+1.66
Total formal votes		48,120	97.01	+0.26
Informal votes		1,481	2.99	−0.26
Turnout		49,601	92.23	−0.65
Two-party-preferred result
Liberal	Mark Coure	27,321	60.55	+3.93
Labor	Lucy Mannering	17,802	39.45	−3.93
Liberal hold		Swing	+3.93	

==== 2015 ====
2015 New South Wales state election: Oatley
Party	Candidate	Votes	%	±%
Liberal	Mark Coure	24,617	51.1	+4.0
Labor	O'Bray Smith	17,536	36.4	−2.6
Greens	Philippa Clark	3,576	7.4	−1.5
Christian Democrats	Wayne Lawrence	1,507	3.1	−1.6
No Land Tax	Dean Eades	894	1.9	+1.9
Total formal votes		48,130	96.7	+0.7
Informal votes		1,617	3.3	−0.7
Turnout		49,747	92.9	−2.3
Two-party-preferred result
Liberal	Mark Coure	25,696	56.6	+2.8
Labor	O'Bray Smith	19,684	43.4	−2.8
Liberal hold		Swing	+2.8	

==== 2011 ====
2011 New South Wales state election: Oatley
Party	Candidate	Votes	%	±%
Liberal	Mark Coure	19,587	44.1	+15.4
Labor	Kevin Greene	18,715	42.1	−10.3
Greens	Anne Wagstaff	3,970	8.9	+4.5
Christian Democrats	Steven Marcos	2,146	4.8	+0.6
Total formal votes		44,418	96.8	−0.6
Informal votes		1,474	3.2	+0.6
Turnout		45,892	93.7	
Two-party-preferred result
Liberal	Mark Coure	20,821	50.5	+14.9
Labor	Kevin Greene	20,381	49.5	−14.9
Liberal gain from Labor		Swing	+14.9	

=== Elections in the 2000s ===
==== 2007 ====
2007 New South Wales state election: Oatley
Party	Candidate	Votes	%	±%
Labor	Kevin Greene	22,213	52.4	−0.1
Liberal	Roger Gray	12,149	28.7	−2.1
Unity	Nancy Liu	2,086	4.9	+0.3
Greens	Paul Gage	1,880	4.4	−1.6
Christian Democrats	Martin Baker	1,786	4.2	+3.9
Independent	Michele Adair	1,291	3.0	+0.2
AAFI	John McGrath	679	1.6	+0.3
Independent	Greg Briscoe-Hough	306	0.7	+0.5
Total formal votes		42,390	97.3	−0.3
Informal votes		1,154	2.7	+0.3
Turnout		43,544	93.4	
Two-party-preferred result
Labor	Kevin Greene	23,960	64.4	+0.2
Liberal	Roger Gray	13,271	35.6	−0.2
Labor notional hold		Swing	+0.2	

District recreated

==== 1930–2007 ====
District abolished

=== Elections in the 1920s ===
==== 1927 ====
1927 New South Wales state election: Oatley
Party	Candidate	Votes	%	±%
Labor	Mark Gosling	7,733	51.3	
Nationalist	James Webb	7,250	48.1	
Independent	John Gager	102	0.7	
Total formal votes		15,085	99.4	
Informal votes		88	0.6	
Turnout		15,173	86.4	
Labor win		(new seat)		
