= Oatley railway station =

Railway station in Sydney, New South Wales, Australia

Oatley
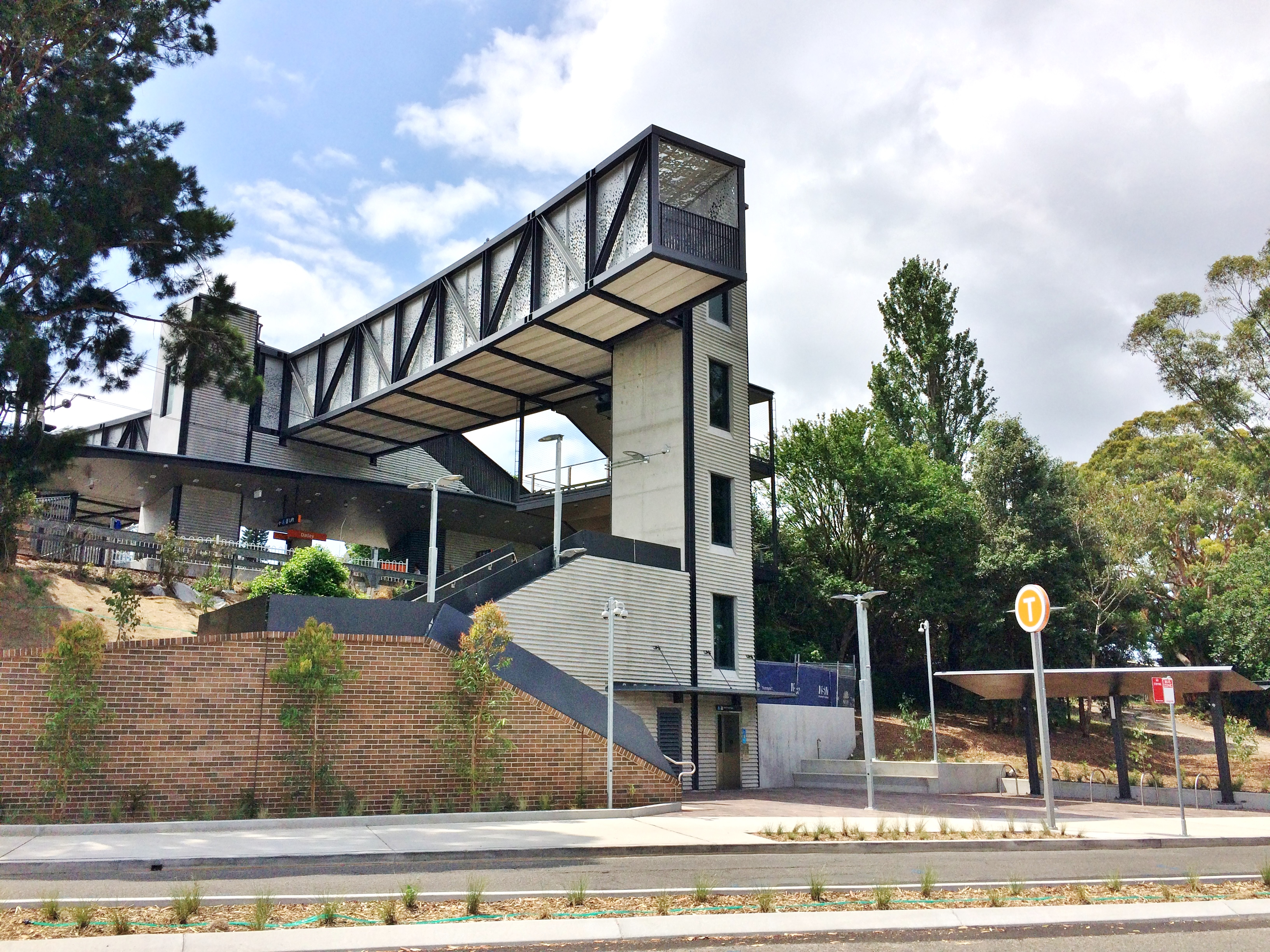
- Station concourse and entrance from Mulga Road in December 2016

General information
- Location: Oatley Parade, Oatley; Sydney, New South Wales; Australia
- Coordinates: 33°58′50″S 151°04′44″E
- Elevation: 33 metres (108 ft)
- Owner: Transport Asset Manager of NSW
- Operator: Sydney Trains
- Line: South Coast
- Distance: 18.28 km (11.36 mi) from Central
- Platforms: 2 (1 island)
- Tracks: 2

Construction
- Structure type: Ground

Other information
- Status: Weekdays: Staffed: 6am to 7pm: Weekends and public holidays: Staffed: 8am to 4pm
- Station code: OAL
- Website: Transport for NSW

History
- Opened: 26 December 1885 (140 years ago)
- Rebuilt: 7 July 1905 (121 years ago)
- Electrified: Yes (from 1926)
- Former names: Oatley's Grant (1885–1886); Oatley's Platform (1886–1890)

Passengers
- 2025: 963,701 (year); 2,640 (daily) (Sydney Trains)
- Rank: 131

Services
Preceding station	Sydney Trains	Following station
Como towards Waterfall or Cronulla	Eastern Suburbs & Illawarra Line	Mortdale towards Bondi Junction

New South Wales Heritage Register
- Official name: Oatley Railway Station group
- Type: State heritage (complex / group)
- Designated: 2 April 1999
- Reference no.: 1214
- Type: Railway Platform / Station
- Category: Transport – Rail
- Builders: NSW Government Railway
Location

Oatley railway station is a heritage-listed suburban railway station located on the South Coast line, serving the Sydney suburb of Oatley. The station is served by Sydney Trains T4 Eastern Suburbs & Illawarra Line services. It was designed and built by the NSW Government Railway and from 1905 to 1992. It is also known as the Oatley Railway Station group. The property was added to the New South Wales State Heritage Register on 2 April 1999.

Oatley is notable as the end point of the first section of track to be electrified for regular passenger services, with services from Central commencing on 1 March 1926. Historically, some services used to terminate at Oatley before returning north; this is no longer the case but the points remain in place. During major service disruptions, services sometimes terminate at Oatley using these points.

In January 2017 an upgrade to the station was opened, including a new overhead footbridge with lifts.

== History ==
The Oatley area was named after James Oatley, who was granted 120 hectares (300 acres) in the area, called Needwood Forest, in 1833. Oatley never built on the grant and it passed to his third son after his death in 1839, who sold the land to Charles Cecil Griffiths in 1881. The property extended from Gungal Bay on the western edge to the later Boundary and Hurstville Roads.

In 1881, the proposed route for the Illawarra railway line was published and approved. In 1882, works began at Marrickville (now Sydenham) on railway construction. In 1884, the railway to Hurstville station opened (double track) with stations at Arncliffe, Rockdale, Kogarah and Hurstville. In 1885, the first single track line (built by C. & E. Miller) was opened as far as Sutherland station, with railway stations opened at Como, Penshurst, Mortdale, and Oatley. The small platform at Oatley, with a timber platform building, opened on 26 December 1885. Judd's Hurstville Brick Works opened in 1884, on a site north of Oatley (now the site of Georges River College). The location of Judd's brick works appears to have been a major reason for the building of Oatley railway station in 1885 in what was then a very sparsely populated area.

The railway station was first called Oatley's Grant (up to 1886) and then Oatley's Platform (by 1889). In 1890, Oatley's Platform finally changed to Oatley. The line was duplicated in 1890. The Station Master's residence was built in 1891. Development in the area was slow – in 1893, there were only nine houses in the vicinity of the railway station. In 1903, a post office was established at the railway station.

In July 1905, regrading of the railway line led to the station being moved 370 metres (400 yd) to the west of its original location, away from the Oatley town centre at Frederick St and Letitia St to the east. This relocation of the line was due to the steep gradient leading down to the Georges River bridge which the goods trains had difficulty climbing. The 1890 weatherboard platform building was relocated to the new station, onto a long curved brick island platform. The platform building is now only one of the two such weatherboard platform buildings of this type in Sydney (the other being at Penshurst railway station). Part of the former railway reservation is now the Oatley Memorial Gardens.

Access from one side of the line to the other was initially via a series of overbridges at various locations along the line. In some localities, these were too far apart, and construction of a series of brick arch subways was begun around 1905 and completed during the 1920s. Construction was in brickwork due to the large number of nearby brickworks. The 1905 brick arched Mulga Road underbridge at Oatley was designed by Per way Branch staff, New South Wales Government Railways. The platform is reached via a subway stair leading off Mulga Road which is part of the underbridge. The underbridge has a semi-circular brick barrel arch spanning 18 metres (58 ft) over a two-lane roadway, and is thought to be the second largest brick arch underbridge in the NSW rail system. The centre of the bridge is now roofed, between the railway tracks (over the subway) however was unroofed in 1943.

In 1918, the present signal box was incorporated within the then open north end awning area of the platform building. The electrification of the line from St James to Oatley was undertaken in the 1920s, and the first electric train ran on 16 August 1926. This was the first line to be electrified.

In December 1930, disused railway land (the former railway alignment to the east) was officially transferred to Kogarah Council, and this became Oatley Memorial Gardens. When first built in 1905, the double track station had an engine road and goods siding on the eastern side but these were closed in 1940.

The platform building arrangement stayed the same until 1992, when State Rail replanned the remaining part of the platform building, providing new toilet facilities and a larger waiting room at the southern end of the building. This resulted in major change to the platform building both externally and internally (except to the signal box, which remains unaltered), including changes to windows and doors. Also in 1992, a new steel platform canopy was built, connecting the platform building and the entrance to the pedestrian subway.

On 3 March 2001, a commemorative trip, utilising RailCorp's heritage electric fleet, was made by the Governor Professor Marie Bashir and invited guests to mark the 75th anniversary of the inaugural journey from St James to Oatley in 1926. In 2005, some of the 1992 changes to the platform building were reversed. The 1918 signal box remains in a near original state despite being superseded for electric light signals in 1926.

In 2015, the Oatley station was upgraded with a 100 vehicle car park, and a pedestrian footbridge with lifts.

== Services ==
=== Platforms ===
Platform	Line	Stopping pattern	Notes
1	Eastern Suburbs & Illawarra Line	services to Bondi Junction	
2	Eastern Suburbs & Illawarra Line	services to Cronulla, Waterfall & Helensburgh	

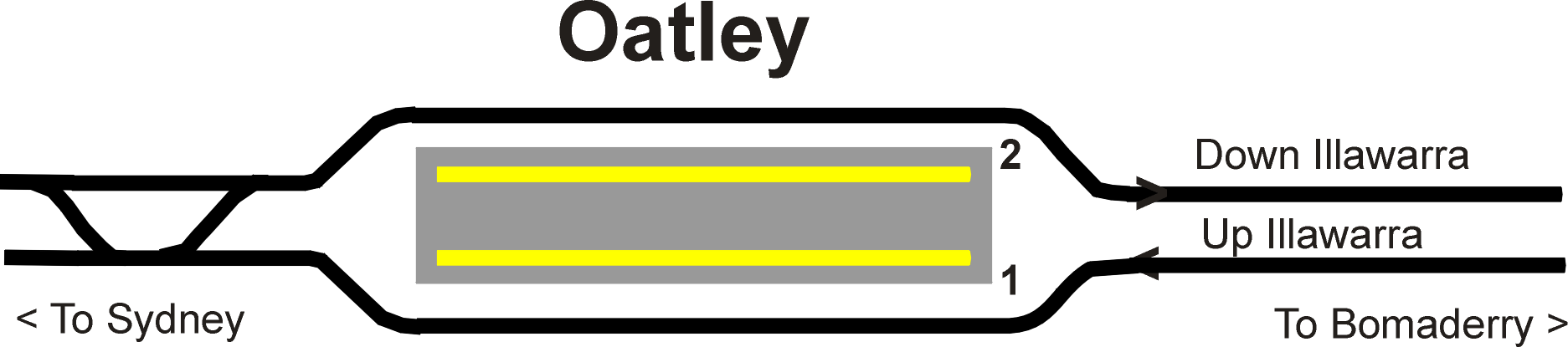
Track layout with crossovers north of station allow trains to terminate on either platform

== Transport Links ==
U-Go Mobility operates a bus route via Oatley station, under contract to Transport for NSW:

- 955: Mortdale Station to Hurstville Station

== Description ==
The complex comprises a type 11 platform building, erected in 1905 to replace the original type 4 building erected in 1890; a signal box extension, erected in 1918; the Mulga Road underbridge and pedestrian subway, erected in 1905; an island platform, erected in 1905; a concrete drop-slab location hut, erected in 1920s; platform canopies, erected in 1992; and moveable items, dated from 1918.

Context

The entry to Oatley Railway Station is via a subway entered from the southern footpath of Mulga Road below the arch of the Mulga Road rail underbridge (road tunnel). There is one island platform, which is curved, has brick edges and asphalt surface. Modern canopies roof the pedestrian subway in the middle of the underbridge, and connect to the platform building.

Platform buildings (1890, 1905, 1918)

The original 1890 building was rebuilt at its current location and altered to an island platform building in 1905. This is a weatherboard island platform building with a 1918 signal box extension at the northern end to protect the original signal levers. There is also a signalling board (not operational). The building has timber posts and brackets to awnings on each side, with timber valances to awning ends. The waiting area has timber panelled double doors, 9-paned timber framed double hung windows with fanlights and sidelights to the waiting area doors on both sides. Doors are modern timber flush. There are timber framed double hung windows at the northern (entry) end of the platform building, in front of which are a modern telephone and modern vending machine. The original ceilings are ripple iron with metal ceiling roses, and original internal walls are also weatherboard. Modern toilets are accessed from within the waiting area (at southern end).

Mulga Road brick underbridge and pedestrian subway (1905)

A single large span brick arch structure at 7.32 m clear span, for road access under the line, with semi-circular arches 600 mm thick. The underbridge is unusual in incorporating the pedestrian subway entry to the station, with the subway roof in the middle of the bridge (between the railway tracks). The subway is accessed off the southern footpath of Mulga Road, under the Mulga Road underbridge.

Island platform (1905)

This is a curved island platform, which has brick faces and an asphalt surface.

Concrete drop-slab location hut (1920's)

This is a small prefabricated concrete location hut to the southeast of the southern end of the station platform. It has a hipped corrugated steel roof.

Platform canopies (1992)

A modern platform canopy connects the pedestrian subway entry to the station to the platform building. Another modern platform canopy extends south of the platform building. Both canopies have gabled corrugated steel roofs, steel posts with concrete bases.

Landscape/Natural features

The station has a parkland setting near its entry point, with parks to east and west of the Mulga Road underbridge, adjacent to the northern end of the station.

Moveable items

Signalling equipment within signal box: a signal panel (not operational), signal levers and three early telephones mounted on the wall.

=== Condition ===
As at 20 May 2009, Platform building (1890) was assessed as in good condition; the signal box (1918), also in good condition; the Mulga Road Brick underbridge and pedestrian subway (1905), also good though some damage to underbridge from vehicle; the island Platform (1905), also good; the platform canopies (1992), assessed as in very good condition; and moveable items (1918) including signalling equipment, assessed as in good condition.

The platform building has intact awnings and intact original form, however windows and doors have been altered. Original weatherboard walls and ripple iron ceilings remain in the interior. The Mulga Road bridge retains its original fabric. The signal box retains its original fabric.

=== Modifications and dates ===
- 1905: Platform building (1890) moved and converted to island platform building
- 1918: weatherboard signal box added to platform building by extending northern end beneath an existing awning
- 1992: extension to waiting room and new toilet; modern doors and security screens to windows. At various places around the building there is clear evidence of doors and windows having been either blocked up or completely removed and re-sheeted over to match the adjoining weatherboarding.

== Heritage listing ==
As at 15 April 2013, Oatley Railway Station – its island platform, platform building with signal box extension, moveable items, Mulga Road underbridge, pedestrian subway, and concrete location hut – was of heritage significance. Originally constructed in 1885 and relocated in 1905, Oatley Railway Station is of historical significance as a transport hub with a close relationship to the development of the suburb of Oatley since 1885, including the development of Judd's Hurstville Brickworks which operated nearby from 1884 until 1972. Oatley Railway Station also has historical association with Oatley Memorial Gardens, a series of linear parks to the east, which represent the pre-1905 alignment of the railway line.

Oatley Railway Station is of aesthetic significance for its landscape setting, flanked by parks to east and west at its northern end, and for its simple yet attractive weatherboard platform building, one of only two weatherboard platform buildings on the Illawarra line. The Mulga Road underbridge and pedestrian subway are of historical significance as part of a series of railway works for upgrading the railway system, undertaken from 1905 into the 1920s.

Oatley railway station was listed on the New South Wales State Heritage Register on 2 April 1999 having satisfied the following criteria.

The place is important in demonstrating the course, or pattern, of cultural or natural history in New South Wales.

Oatley Railway Station, originally constructed 1885 and relocated 1905, is of historical significance as part of the second phase of construction of the Illawarra railway line, and through its relationship to the development of the suburb of Oatley from 1885. Oatley Railway Station appears to have been located in what was then a sparsely populated area due to the opening of Judd's Hurstville Brick Works nearby in 1884. The Mulga Road underbridge and pedestrian subway are of historical significance as part of a series of railway works undertaken to upgrade the line from 1905 into the 1920s. Oatley Railway Station also has historical association with Oatley Memorial Gardens, a series of linear parks to the east between Oatley Parade and Oatley Avenue, which became available as parkland after the realignment of the railway line in 1905.

The place is important in demonstrating aesthetic characteristics and/or a high degree of creative or technical achievement in New South Wales.

Oatley Railway station is of aesthetic significance for its landscape setting, flanked by parks to east and west at its northern end, and for its simple yet attractive Federation Queen Anne style-influenced weatherboard platform building.

The place has a strong or special association with a particular community or cultural group in New South Wales for social, cultural or spiritual reasons.

The place has the potential to contribute to the local community's sense of place, and can provide a connection to the local community's past.

The place has potential to yield information that will contribute to an understanding of the cultural or natural history of New South Wales.

The signal box demonstrates signalling technology of the early 1900s, however there are a number of other examples of this technology on the Illawarra line and elsewhere within the NSW Railways network.

The place possesses uncommon, rare or endangered aspects of the cultural or natural history of New South Wales.

The weatherboard 1905 platform building is considered a rare example for an urban context, and reflects the semi-rural nature of the area when it was built (the only other example on the Illawarra line of a weatherboard platform building in metropolitan context is at Penshurst), and it is one of only four extant weatherboard platform buildings of its type on the Illawarra line.

The place is important in demonstrating the principal characteristics of a class of cultural or natural places/environments in New South Wales.

The Oatley platform building is an example of a standard roadside building converted to an island platform building. The building is one of four weatherboard standard island platform buildings on the Illawarra line with other examples at Austinmer, Penshurst and Thirroul. The Oatley platform building is the most altered of the four extant examples (note there are 12 stations on the Illawarra line with brick examples of this type of platform building).

The Mulga Road underbridge is a good representative example of brick arch construction. The Mulga Road underbridge is thought to be the second largest brick arch underbridge in the railway system.

The concrete location hut is a good representative example of an Inter War period pre-cast concrete railway structure, one of many examples in the NSW Railway network.

== See also ==
- List of railway stations in Sydney
