= Mortdale railway station =

Railway station in Sydney, New South Wales, Australia

Mortdale
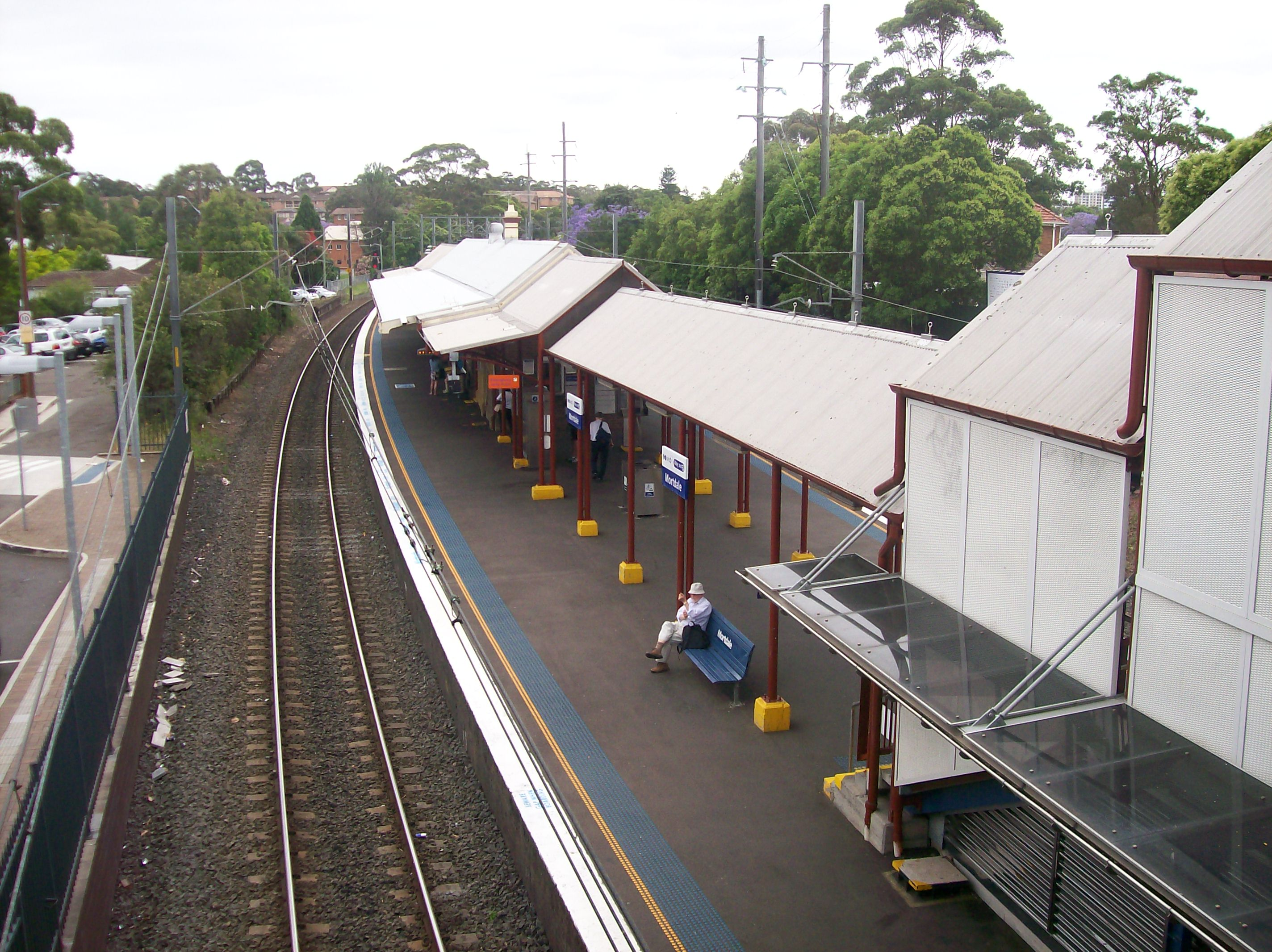
- Northbound view of Platform 2 in January 2008

General information
- Location: Morts Road, Mortdale; Sydney, New South Wales; Australia
- Coordinates: 33°58′15″S 151°04′52″E
- Elevation: 47 metres (154 ft)
- Owner: Transport Asset Manager of NSW
- Operator: Sydney Trains
- Line: South Coast
- Distance: 17.06 km (10.60 mi) from Central
- Platforms: 2 (1 island)
- Tracks: 2
- Connections: Bus

Construction
- Structure type: Ground

Other information
- Status: Weekdays: Staffed: 6am to 10pm: Weekends and public holidays: Staffed: 6am to 10pm
- Station code: MDE
- Website: Transport for NSW

History
- Opened: 20 March 1897 (129 years ago)
- Rebuilt: 14 September 1922 (104 years ago)
- Electrified: Yes (from 1926)

Passengers
- 2025: 1,720,413 (year); 4,713 (daily) (Sydney Trains)
- Rank: 87

Services
| Preceding station | Sydney Trains | Following station |
|---|---|---|
| Oatley towards Waterfall or Cronulla | Eastern Suburbs & Illawarra Line | Penshurst towards Bondi Junction |
Location

Mortdale railway station is a suburban railway station located on the South Coast line, serving the Sydney suburb of Mortdale. It is served by Sydney Trains T4 Eastern Suburbs & Illawarra Line services.

== History ==
Mortdale station opened on 20 March 1897 being relocated north to its current location on 14 September 1922 when a new deviation of the Illawarra line opened. South of the station lies the Mortdale Maintenance Depot.

In March 2007, the station received an accessibility upgrade which included tactile indicators and a lift.

== Services ==
=== Platforms ===
| Platform | Line | Stopping pattern | Notes |
| 1 | Eastern Suburbs & Illawarra Line | services to Bondi Junction | |
| 2 | Eastern Suburbs & Illawarra Line | services to Cronulla, Waterfall & Helensburgh | |

=== Transport links ===
U-Go Mobility operates three bus routes via Mortdale station, under contract to Transport for NSW:

- 945: Hurstville Station to Bankstown station
- 955: to Hurstville Station via Oatley
- 956: to Peakhurst Heights

The station is served by one NightRide route:

- N10: Sutherland station to Town Hall station

== Trackplan ==
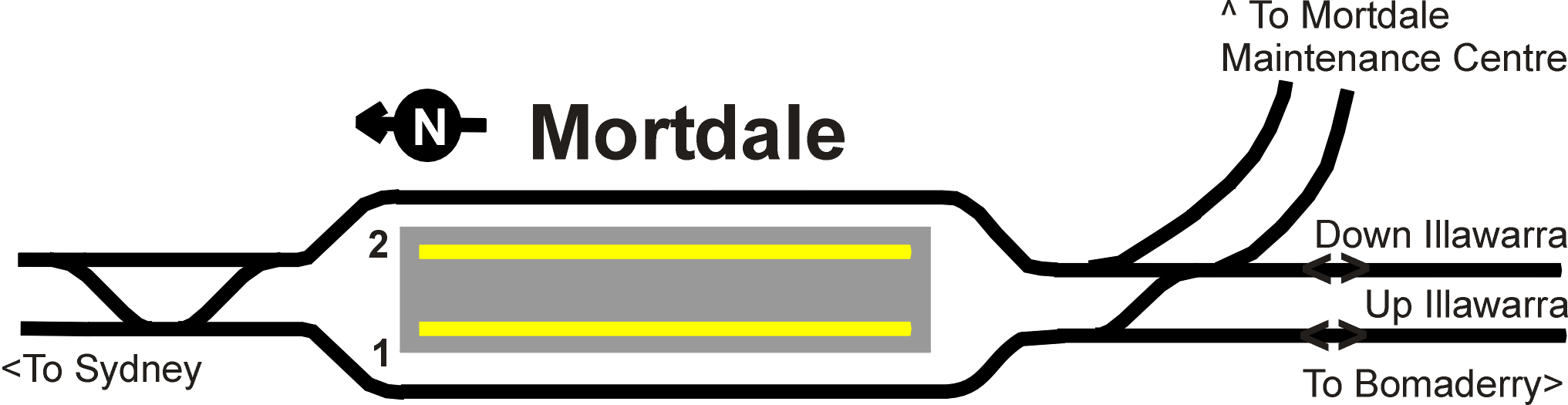
Track layout
