= Penshurst Station =

Penshurst Station can refer to:

- Penshurst railway station, Kent, England
- Penshurst railway station, Sydney
