= Colin Fraser (rugby league) =

Australian rugby league footballer

Personal information
- Full name: Colin Fraser
- Born: 22 March 1963 (age 62); Sydney, New South Wales, Australia

Playing information
- Position: Lock, Second-row
Club
| Years | Team | Pld | T | G | FG | P |
|---|---|---|---|---|---|---|
| 1982–88 | St. George Dragons | 69 | 15 | 0 | 0 | 59 |
| 1989 | Eastern Suburbs | 3 | 0 | 0 | 0 | 0 |
| | Total | 72 | 15 | 0 | 0 | 59 |
- Source: Whiticker/Hudson

Colin Fraser (born 22 March 1963) is an Australian former rugby league footballer who played in the 1980s.

== Playing career ==
Fraser grew up in Penshurst, New South Wales and came through the junior ranks to play for St. George for seven seasons between 1982-1988 and played second row or lock forward.

Fraser was a reserve for the Dragons when they won the 1988 Panasonic Cup. He moved to Eastern Suburbs for one season before retiring in 1989.

Fraser was previously the junior development officer at the St. George Dragons.
