= Mark Coure =

Australian politician

The Honourable Mark Coure MP
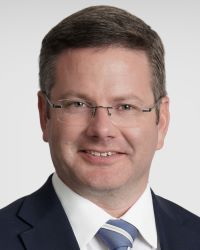

Member of the New South Wales Parliament for Oatley
- Incumbent
- Assumed office 26 March 2011
- Preceded by: Kevin Greene
- Majority: 1.3 points

Minister for Multiculturalism
- In office 21 December 2021 – 28 March 2023
- Preceded by: Natalie Ward
- Succeeded by: Steve Kamper

Minister for Seniors
- In office 21 December 2021 – 28 March 2023
- Preceded by: Natalie Ward
- Succeeded by: Jodie Harrison

Personal details
- Born: 14 September Hurstville Grove
- Party: Liberal Party
- Website: www.markcoure.com.au

Mark Joseph Coure (/ˈkuːreɪ/ KOO-ray) is an Australian politician. He is a member of the New South Wales Legislative Assembly representing Oatley for the Liberal Party since 2011 and served in the second Perrottet ministry.

== Early years and background ==
Coure was educated at St Joseph's at Oatley, then Marist College Penshurst and Kogarah. He was a business operator and franchisee owner of Mortgage Choice, a mortgage broking service.

== Local government ==
Coure was elected to Kogarah City Council representing West Ward in 2004, and was re-elected in 2008 with an increased majority. He has been chair of the council's Development and Assessment Committee, the Assets & Services Committee, and the Governance & Finance Committee.

== State politics ==
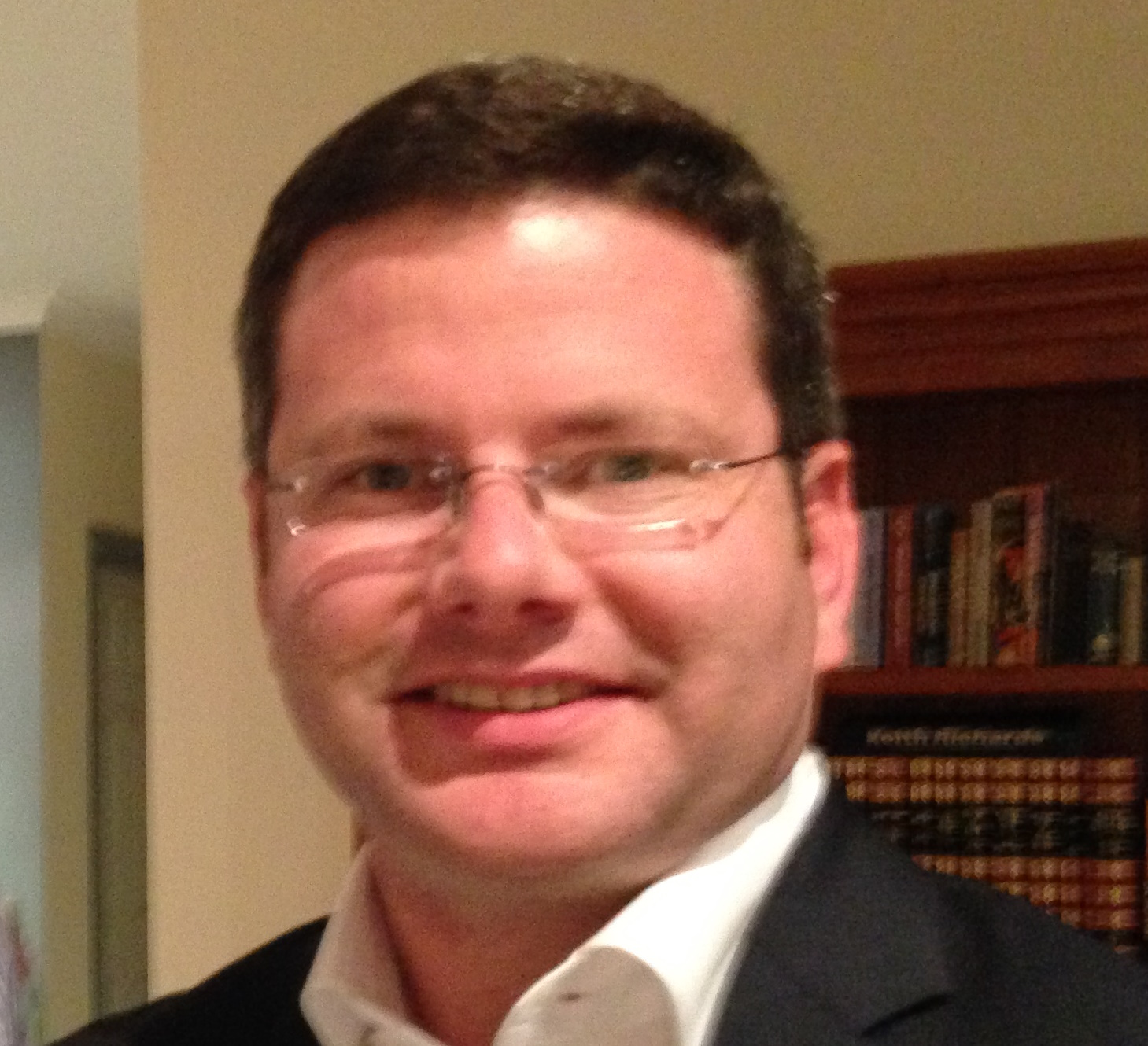
Mark Coure MP in 2013

In 2011 Coure contested the normally safe Labor seat of Oatley in the St George-Kogarah district. Coure was elected with a swing of 15.9 points, winning the seat with 50.5 per cent of the two-party vote. Coure's opponent was the incumbent Labor sitting member, Kevin Greene who had held the seat for 12 years.

Coure was appointed to the Independent Commission Against Corruption Committee on 22 June 2011. Coure was appointed Deputy Whip of the New South Wales Parliament's Legislative Assembly in 2015. In 2019, he was elected Assistant Speaker of the Legislative Assembly.

In July 2020 The Daily Telegraph reported on Coure's ties to a businessman linked to the United Front Work Department of the Chinese Communist Party.

In December 2021 Coure was appointed as the Minister for Multiculturalism and the Minister for Seniors in the Perrottet government.

New South Wales Legislative Assembly
Preceded by Kevin Greene	Member for Oatley; 2011–present	Incumbent
Political offices
Preceded by Natalie Ward	Minister for Multiculturalism; 2021–2023	Succeeded by Steve Kamper
Preceded by Natalie Ward	Minister for Seniors; 2021–2023	Succeeded by Jodie Harrison
