= Mortdale Memorial Park =

Park in Sydney, Australia

Coordinates: 33.9717°S 151.0754°E

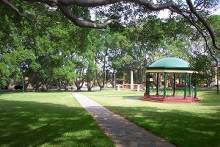
Mortdale Memorial Park

Mortdale Memorial Park is a reserve located in the southern Sydney suburb of Mortdale. It contains a war memorial commemorating local people who served their country in time of war. The park is a popular place for picnics, weddings, and concerts.

== History ==
The land which now forms Mortdale Park was originally home to a small brick pit where hand-made bricks were produced. This operation ceased in 1884 when the Mortdale Brickworks was established near Mortdale Public School.

Mortdale Park had a very difficult beginning. Many different associations vied for their own piece of land in Mortdale for a park – the local Chamber of Commerce, the RSL, the local Parents & Citizens group and the Council.

Debate started in September 1924 when residents asked for a park on the corner of Victoria Avenue and Cook Street. Within a year the Chamber of Commerce put forward an alternative at the corner of Morts and Forest Roads. Over the next few years both sites were advocated as possibilities, but the location finally chosen was on Boundary Road between Martin Place and Oxford Street.

Mortdale Park was operational by 1935. In 1942, Hurstville Council refused the local Presbyterian Church permission to construct air raid trenches in the Park for its children.

The Mortdale Memorial Monument, originally erected in the Shopping Centre during 1922, was later moved to Mortdale Park. In 1976 the current memorial was built.

The name was changed from Mortdale Park to Mortdale Memorial Park in 1997.

== Features ==
Mortdale Memorial Park has the following features:

- The Mortdale Memorial, a war memorial commemorating Mortdale people who served in the First and Second world wars and the Korean War. This is a brick cenotaph to which is affixed a number of honour rolls, flag staffs, service commemorative objects, and a number of individual memorials
- A classical rotunda with domed roof
- A border of large Small-leaved Fig trees

The Park is a popular local attraction, hosting various social activities including:

- A yearly ANZAC Day Commemorative Service in April, along with a street march form nearby Mortdale RSL Club
- A Carols by Candlelight sing-along in December prior to Christmas
- Wedding photographs and wedding ceremonies

== See also ==
- Parks in Sydney
