= Kevin Greene (politician) =

Australian politician (born 1958)

The Honourable Kevin Greene AM

Minister for Sport and Recreation Minister for Gaming and Racing
- In office 8 September 2008 – 28 March 2011
- Premier: Nathan Rees; Kristina Keneally
- Preceded by: Graham West
- Succeeded by: Graham Annesley; George Souris

Minister for Major Events
- In office 5 June 2010 – 28 March 2011
- Premier: Kristina Keneally
- Preceded by: Ian Macdonald
- Succeeded by: George Souris

Minister for Community Services
- In office 2 April 2007 – 8 September 2008
- Premier: Morris Iemma
- Preceded by: Reba Meagher
- Succeeded by: Linda Burney

Member of the New South Wales Parliament for Oatley
- In office 24 March 2007 – 26 March 2011
- Preceded by: New seat
- Succeeded by: Mark Coure

Member of the New South Wales Parliament for Georges River
- In office 27 March 1999 – 24 March 2007
- Preceded by: Marie Ficarra
- Succeeded by: Seat abolished

1st Mayor of Georges River
- In office 25 September 2017 – 30 December 2021
- Deputy: See list: Kathryn Landsberry Sam Elmir Con Hindi Stephen Agius
- Preceded by: John Rayner (Administrator)
- Succeeded by: Nick Katris

Councillor of Georges River Council for Peakhurst Ward
- In office 9 September 2017 – 31 October 2022
- Succeeded by: Veronica Ficarra

Personal details
- Born: 18 October 1958 (age 67)
- Party: Labor
- Spouse: Frances Greene (m. 1987)
- Children: Six
- Profession: Teacher

Kevin Patrick Greene AM (born 18 October 1958), is an Australian former politician, elected as a member of the New South Wales Legislative Assembly from 1999 to 2011, and as a Councillor (2017–2022) and Mayor (2017–2021) of Georges River Council.

== Early life and background ==
Greene grew up in the St George region of southern Sydney, attending St Declan's Catholic Primary School in Penshurst, where his father was president of the parents and friends organisation. After graduating from year 12 in 1976, Greene attended the University of New South Wales for a Bachelor of Commerce degree which he did not complete, preferring instead to coach boys football and cricket. In 1977, at the age of 19 Greene became president of the Illawarra Catholic cricket club and secretary of the football club, and was later a director of the Illawarra Catholic Club Ltd.

Greene married in 1987 to Frances, who had two daughters and one son from a previous marriage, and the marriage would produce a further three children: two daughters and one son.

Greene has a Diploma of Education and a Bachelor of Education and was a teacher before running for parliament, with his last position being as the principal of St Brendan's Catholic Primary School in Annandale, the smallest school in the Roman Catholic Archdiocese of Sydney.

== NSW Parliament ==
Greene represented Georges River from 1999 until its abolition in 2007, when he was elected as the member for Oatley.

Greene was the New South Wales Minister for Gaming and Racing, Minister for Sport and Recreation, and Minister for Major Events. Greene lost his seat in the 2011 New South Wales state election.

== Local government ==
In June 2017, it was Greene announced he was standing as a Labor candidate for the Peakhurst Ward of the newly created Georges River Council. At the subsequent local government elections on 9 September 2017, he was elected in the first position as a Councillor, with the Labor ticket taking 42% of the first preference vote (1.69 quotas), enough to elect the second person on his ticket.

At the first meeting of the elected council on 25 September 2017, Greene was elected unopposed as the inaugural mayor of Georges River Council, and was re-elected in September 2021 to the December 2021 election. At the 2021 local government elections, Greene stood again for Peakhurst Ward and was re-elected on the first count. Although re-elected to council, Greene retired from the position of mayor when his term expired on 30 December 2021, to be succeeded by Nick Katris. In September 2022, Greene announced his retirement as a Peakhurst Ward councillor, with his resignation to take effect from 31 October 2022.

== Post-political career ==
In June 2022, Greene was appointed as a director representing the metropolitan members on the board of the New South Wales Rugby League. Greene is also Chair of the NSWRL Referees Association. Greene is also a board member and deputy chair of Cricket NSW.

Kevin joined the Netstrata Foundation as Chairman of the Board in 2025. Kevin’s deep commitment to community and public service underpins his leadership of the Netstrata Foundation, guiding its mission to fund and support initiatives that create stronger, more connected communities.

In the 2023 King's Birthday Honours, Greene was awarded the Member of the Order of Australia (AM) for "significant service to the Parliament of New South Wales, to local government, and to the community." He was also a recipient of the Australian Sports Medal in 2000.

New South Wales Legislative Assembly
Preceded by Marie Ficarra	Member for Georges River; 1999–2007	District abolished
New district	Member for Oatley; 2007–2011	Succeeded by Mark Coure
Political offices
Preceded by Reba Meagher	Minister for Community Services; 2007–2008	Succeeded by Linda Burney
Preceded by Graham West	Minister for Sport and Recreation; 2008–2011	Succeeded by Graham Annesley
Preceded by Graham West	Minister for Gaming and Racing; 2008–2011	Succeeded by George Souris as Minister for Tourism, Major Events, Hospitality and Racing
Preceded by Ian Macdonald	Minister for Major Events; 2010–2011	Succeeded by George Souris as Minister for Tourism, Major Events, Hospitality and Racing
Civic offices
Preceded by John Rayner as Administrator	Mayor of Georges River Council; 2017–2021	Succeeded by Nick Katris
