= Peakhurst =

- Suburb
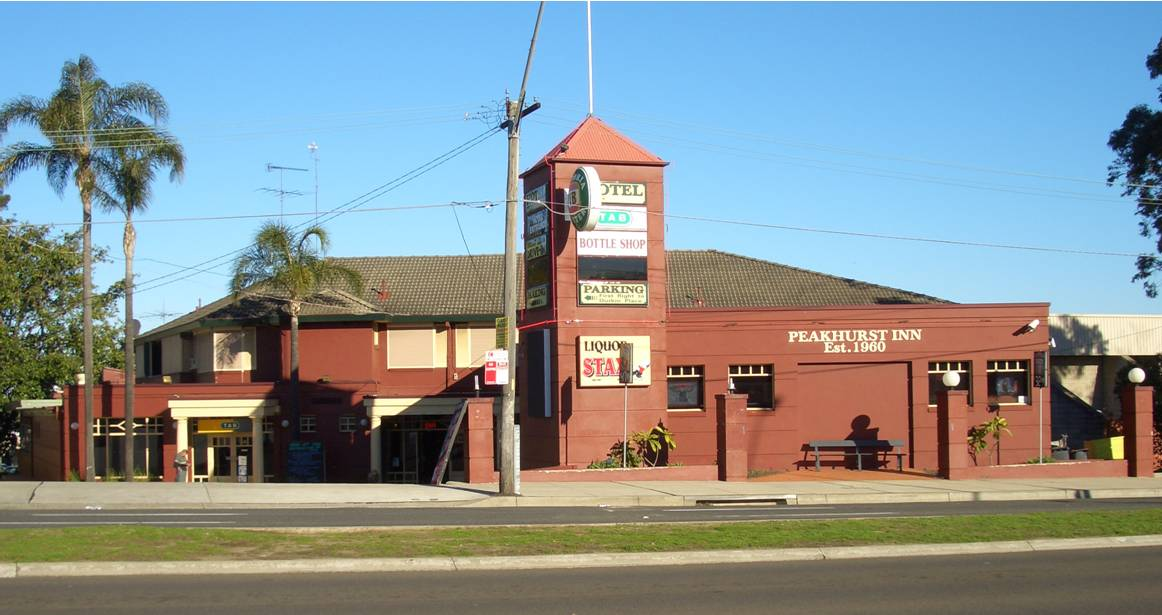
- Peakhurst Inn, Forest Road

- Interactive map of Peakhurst
- Country: Australia
- State: New South Wales
- City: Sydney
- LGA: Georges River Council
- Location: 21 km (13 mi) South of Sydney CBD
- Established: 1840

Government
  - State electorate: Oatley
  - Federal division: Banks
- Elevation: 46 m (151 ft)

Population
  - Total: 12,079 (2021 census)
- Postcode: 2210
Suburbs around Peakhurst
Riverwood	Riverwood	Hurstville
Padstow	Peakhurst	Mortdale
Padstow Heights	Lugarno	Peakhurst Heights

Peakhurst is a suburb in Southern Sydney, or the St George Area, in the state of New South Wales, Australia. It is located 21 kilometres south of the Sydney central business district and is in the local government area of the Georges River Council.

Peakhurst has a western border on Salt Pan Creek, on the Georges River. Peakhurst Heights is a separate suburb to the south, which is bordered by Boggywell Creek and Lime Kiln Bay, on the Georges River. Peakhurst Heights is sometimes still considered to be part of 'Peakhurst' by some residents of the area.

== History ==
Peakhurst was named after landholder John Robert Peake, who bought 10 acres of land near the junction of the present Forest Road and Henry Lawson Drive in 1838. He gave a block of land on which the Wesleyan Church was built in 1855.

The area was originally part of an 1808 land grant to Captain John Townson. John Robert Peake bought his land from William Hebblewhite in 1838. School Inspector Huffer suggested that Peake's name be used to name the suburb when the public school was founded in 1871. The post office opened in 1885.

The first industry in the area was timber-cutting, due to the surrounding natural forests being thick with a variety of woods, especially turpentine. The timber was carted to Sydney by bullock teams. As the land was cleared, orchardists followed the timber-cutters.

== Commercial area ==
Peakhurst's commercial centres are predominantly located along Forest Road and Boundary Road. Various retail shops, restaurants and cafes are located near the Peakhurst Inn Hotel on Forest Road. The hotel contains a pub and drive-through bottle shop. Peakhurst also contains a sizeable industrial area mainly on and around Boundary Road.

== Transport ==
The main roads are Forest Road, Henry Lawson Drive, Stoney Creek Road, Boundary Road, Bonds Road, Broad Arrow Road, Isaac Street, Baumans Road. Forest Road, which links to Henry Lawson Drive at Peakhurst, is the busiest carriageway that extends through numerous other suburbs in Sydney. The nearest railway station is located in neighbouring Riverwood.

U-Go Mobility operates five bus routes through Peakhurst:

- 945 from Bankstown station to Hurstville station
- 948 from Lugarno to Riverwood station
- 949 from Lugarno to Hurstville station
- 950 from Bankstown station to Hurstville station
- 951 to Roselands shopping centre
- 952 from Hurstville station to Roselands shopping centre

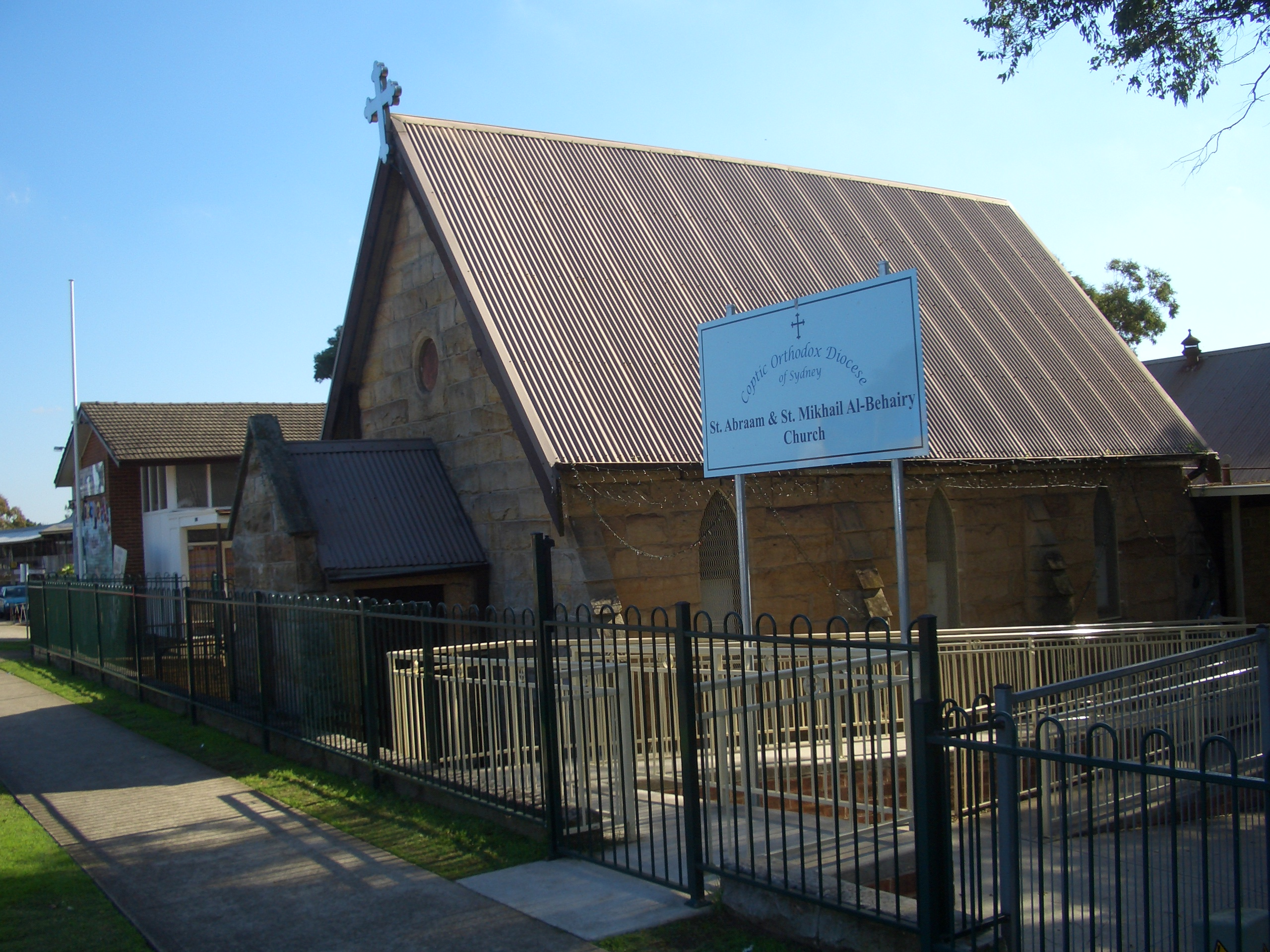
St Abraam and St Mikhail Al-Behairy Coptic Orthodox Church

== Schools ==
There are four public schools: Georges River College Peakhurst Campus, Peakhurst Public School, Peakhurst South Public School, Peakhurst West Public School.

== Churches ==
Georges River Life Church, Church@thepeak Anglican Church, Our Lady of Fatima Catholic Church, St Abraam and St Mikhail Al-Behairy Coptic Orthodox Church, Peakhurst Uniting Church, Spanish Evangelical Jerusalem Baptist Church, Samoan Assembly of God Church.

== Sport and recreation ==
Popular recreational venues include Grandviews Bowling Club (lawn bowls), tennis courts, Peakhurst Park and the numerous sporting fields located at Gannon's Park. The soccer clubs here are Peakhurst United and Forest Rangers.

== Demographics ==
According to the 2021 census of Population, there were 12,079 people usually resident in Peakhurst. 36.5% stated they were born overseas with the top countries of birth being China 7.1%, Lebanon 1.7%, England 1.6%, Hong Kong 1.5% and New Zealand 1.5%. English was stated as the only language spoken at home by 55.0% of residents and the most common other languages spoken were Mandarin 6.8%, Arabic 5.9%, Cantonese 5.8%, Greek 5.1% and Macedonian 2.7%. The most common responses for religious affiliation were No Religion 23.5%, Catholic 23.3%, Orthodox 10.7%, Anglican 9.7% and Not stated 7.0%.

== Notable residents ==
- Oliver Arnold Olds (1896-1979) Born in Burwood. Served 13th Infantry Battalion - 13 to 18 Reinforcements (December 1915 – May 1916) in World War I. A prominent resident. Lived at 78 Bonds Road. The house was built about 1921 for John Olds, and has been owned by the family ever since. In 1927, Oliver Arnold Olds took up residence and the house became known as 'Ilfracombe'. He was an alderman on Hurstville Council for many years. First elected on 6 December 1941, he retired in 1959 after serving as deputy mayor in 1944, mayor in 1946, 1947 and 1948, and deputy mayor again in 1956. Olds Park was named in his honour.
- Myles Joseph Dunphy (1891-1985) - architect and conservationist.
- Elizabeth (Betsy) Matthias (1882-1963) - socialist and charity-worker.
- Richard Farleigh (1960s-1980s), now residing in London, a successful private investor, former hedge fund manager, international chess player representing Bermuda and Monaco, and "Dragon" on the BBC Two reality television program Dragons' Den.

== Politics ==
The Georges River Council local government area which administers Peakhurst, consists of 12 councillors elected every four years. Peakhurst falls into the Peakhurst ward. A further four suburbs are contained wholly or partly in the Peakhurst Ward: Riverwood, Oatley, Lugarno and Peakhurst Heights.

Peakhurst is located in the State Electoral Division of Oatley, currently held by the Liberal Party on a margin of 0.8%.

At the Federal level, Peakhurst is located in the Division of Banks, currently held by the Labor Party on a margin of 2.4%.

== Environment ==
An audit of the environmental impact of the industrial area was commenced in September 2002. Bushcare volunteers help preserve remnant pockets of native forestation. A very small number of fresh water watercourses exist in the suburb, mostly draining into Salt Pan Creek. A portion of the Peakhurst tree population was included in the 1990 National Trust Lugarno Tree Study.
