= Penshurst Reservoirs =

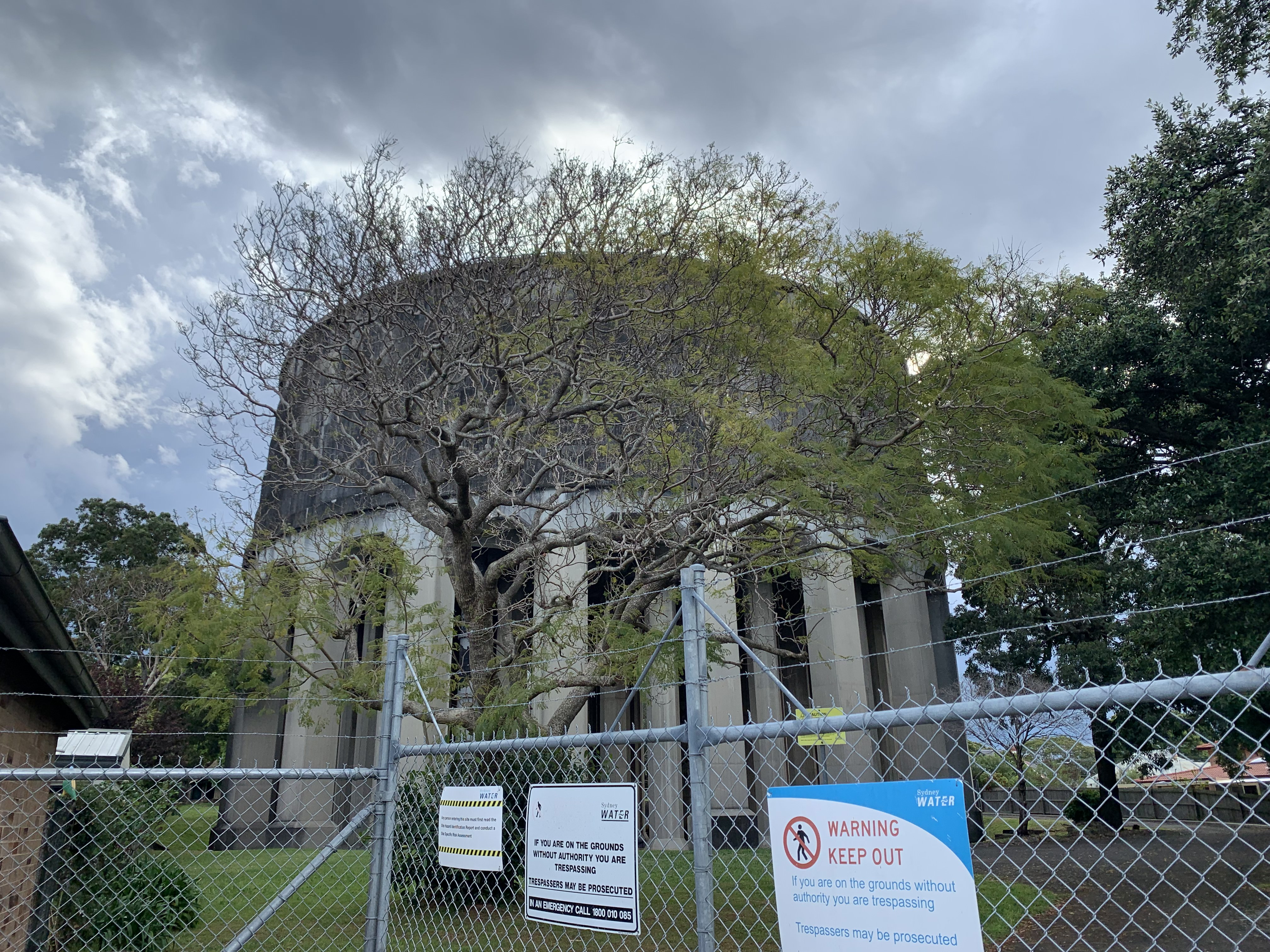
- Penshurst Reservoir WS88 from Penshurst Ave, in October 2021

- Location within Sydney Location within Australia
- 33°58′02″S 151°05′30″E
- Location: Laycock Road, Penshurst, Georges River Council, New South Wales, Australia

History
- Built: 1895

Site notes
- Architect: NSW Public Works Department
- Owner: Sydney Water

New South Wales Heritage Register
- Official name: Penshurst Reservoirs; WS87 & R88; Penshurst Elevated Steel Reservoir No 2; Penshurst Elevated Concrete Reservoir No 3
- Type: State heritage (built)
- Designated: 18 November 1999
- Reference no.: 1330
- Type: Water Supply Reservoir / Dam
- Category: Utilities – Water
- Builders: Public Works Department

The Penshurst Reservoirs are heritage-listed reservoirs located at Laycock Road, Penshurst in the Georges River Council local government area of New South Wales, Australia. They were designed and built during 1895 by the NSW Public Works Department. The reservoirs are also known as WS87 & R88, Penshurst Elevated Steel Reservoir No 2 and Penshurst Elevated Concrete Reservoir No 3. The property is owned by Sydney Water, an agency of the Government of New South Wales. The site was added to the New South Wales State Heritage Register on 18 November 1999.

== History ==
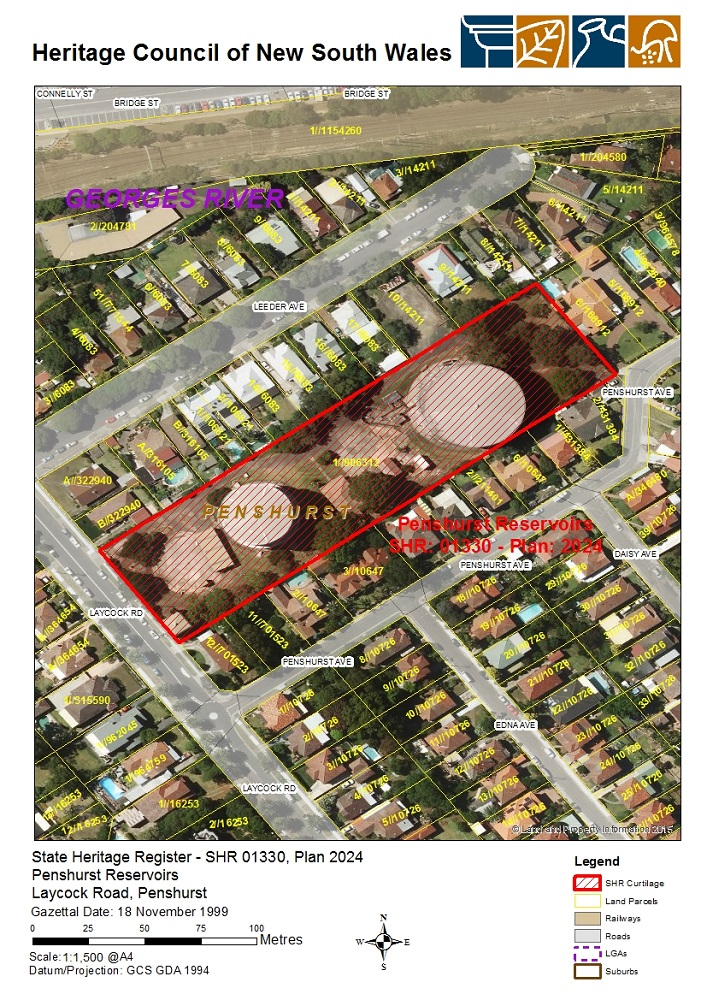
heritage boundaries

In 1891 a cast iron elevated 0.09-megalitre (20,000 imp gal; 24,000 US gal) tank was constructed at Penshurst. Only the brick stand still survives. It was supplied with Upper Nepean Scheme water by a pumping station at Carlton. To augment supply, Penshurst Reservoir No. 1, a riveted steel surface reservoir, was constructed in 1895. By 1910, further growth in demand was met with the construction of the elevated Penshurst Reservoir No. 2 (WS87), a riveted steel elevated reservoir. Penshurst Tank was removed in 1914, first to Campbelltown and, in 1942, to Warragamba Township. The fourth reservoir, the elevated Penshurst Reservoir No. 3 (WS88), a large concrete elevated reservoir, was constructed in 1938. The elevated Penshurst Reservoir (WS87), built in 1910, is one of a group of four similar elevated reservoirs, the others being Bellevue Hill Reservoir (WS10), Drummoyne Reservoir (WS38), completed in 1910, and Ashfield Reservoir (WS3), completed in 1912.

In the meantime, Lakemba Pumping Station took over supply for Penshurst in 1924, but also supplied Wiley Park and East Hills from 1930. Carlton pumping station continued in emergency service until decommissioned in 1939. Penshurst Reservoir No. 1 was removed in 1951 and re-erected at Newport. With plans to extend the Woronora Pipeline to the Metropolitan System, a Main was commenced in 1958 from Penshurst to Allawah. However, by 1961, it was realised that instead of Woronora supplying Sydney, the opposite would be the case, with Warragamba water supplementing areas supplied by Woronora. This situation required further amplification of the mains between the City Tunnel at Ashfield and the Penshurst Reservoirs, including a new main from the City Tunnel to Allawah, pumped by a new pumping station in Canterbury Park, together with a pumping station at Allawah to pump water to Penshurst. Completion of this scheme in 1969 allowed Warragamba water to be fed into the Woronora Pipeline in sufficient quantity to assist in the supply of Sutherland, Cronulla and beyond.

== Description ==
Penshurst Reservoir (WS87) is one of a group of four similar elevated reservoirs, the others being Bellevue Hill Reservoir (WS10), erected in 1910, Drummoyne Reservoir (WS38), erected in 1910, and Ashfield Reservoir (WS3), erected in 1912. Each reservoir is an elevated cylindrical riveted steel tank, resting on a concrete apron and supported on a steel girder frame. The perimeter of the steel stand has a façade of concrete columns and arches, which forms a decorative, rather than a structural feature. The walkway around the rim of the reservoir has been removed. Standard features include a handrail in tubular steel, davit, access ladder, depth gauge board, inlet and outlet valve chambers.

The full service level is 92 metres (302 ft) and the reservoir has a capacity of 6.6 megalitres (1,500×10^{3} imp gal; 1,700×10^{3} US gal). The Penshurst Reservoir Site also includes the former Water Service Officer's Cottage, the concrete base of Penshurst Reservoir No. 1, the brick stand for Penshurst Tank (1891), valves and pipework associated with the connection in 1942 of the Woronora supply with Upper Nepean System water and a number of skid huts (3 in total). Significant plantings around the site include cypress, viburnum, jacaranda, camphor laurel, oleander and native species.

=== Modifications and dates ===
The reservoir has been roofed to safeguard water quality (1977).

== Heritage listing ==
As at 2 May 2005, the Penshurst Reservoirs (WS87 and WS88) are one of a small group of four similar elevated reservoirs in the Sydney Water system, the others being Bellevue Hill Reservoir (WS10), erected in 1910, Drummoyne Reservoir (WS38), erected in 1910, and the Ashfield Reservoir (WS 3), erected in 1912. The group of reservoirs demonstrates a high level of engineering expertise and architectural detail, accommodating both structural requirements and aesthetic qualities. Penshurst Reservoirs and Site demonstrates the rapid growth in demand for water in Sydney's southern suburbs as well as exhibiting a wide range of reservoir construction technology. It is the key site connecting Woronora and Warragamba water supply since 1942. The site has been in continuous use for water supply since 1891, over 100 years. Penshurst Reservoir (WS88) is the largest elevated reinforced concrete reservoir in the Sydney Water Supply System.

Penshurst Reservoirs was listed on the New South Wales State Heritage Register on 18 November 1999 having satisfied the following criteria.

The place is important in demonstrating the course, or pattern, of cultural or natural history in New South Wales.

Penshurst Reservoirs and Site demonstrates the rapid growth in demand for water in Sydney's southern suburbs as well as exhibiting a wide range of reservoir construction technology. It is the key site connecting Woronora and Warragamba water supply since 1942. The site has been in continuous use for water supply since 1891, over 100 years.

The place is important in demonstrating aesthetic characteristics and/or a high degree of creative or technical achievement in New South Wales.

Penshurst Reservoir (WS87) and Penshurst Reservoir (WS88) form a dramatic landmark on the skyline for the surrounding area.

The place has potential to yield information that will contribute to an understanding of the cultural or natural history of New South Wales.

Penshurst Reservoir (WS87) is one of a small group of four similar elevated reservoirs, the others being Bellevue Hill Reservoir, (WS10), 1910, Drummoyne Reservoir (WS38), 1910, and Ashfield Reservoir (WS3), 1912. The group of reservoirs demonstrates a high level of engineering expertise and architectural detail, accommodating both structural requirements and aesthetic qualities. This reservoir site demonstrates the broad range and variety of construction techniques for water storage reservoirs.

The place possesses uncommon, rare or endangered aspects of the cultural or natural history of New South Wales.

This reservoir (WS87) is one of four riveted steel elevated reservoirs on a steel girder stand with concrete surround in the Sydney Water system, rarer still because of the high level of architectural detailing.

WS 88 is one of a small group of elevated concrete reservoirs on a concrete pier stand. The largest of its type in the Sydney Water System. The "skid huts" are a rare survival, demonstrating former working conditions in the MWS&DB.

The place is important in demonstrating the principal characteristics of a class of cultural or natural places/environments in New South Wales.

The riveted steel tank was common technology for surface reservoirs, but was extremely rare when combined with an elevated steel frame with concrete apron.

== See also ==
- List of reservoirs and dams in New South Wales
- Sydney Water
- Bankstown Reservoir
