= Sue Denison =

Australian nurse practitioner

Suzanne Judith Denison OAM, née Brown (born in 1943) is an Australian nurse practitioner based in the rural New South Wales town of Nundle. Together with Jane O'Connell, she was one of the first two authorised Nurse Practitioners in Australia.

== Early life ==
Denison was born in the early 1940s and grew up in Penshurst, Sydney, to a father who was a doctor and a mother who was a nurse. She was educated at Presbyterian Ladies' College in Croydon.

== Career ==
On completing her initial nursing training in Royal Prince Alfred Hospital and midwifery training in King George the V Hospital (KGV), Denison worked in the Warren district hospital and the aged care in Sydney. However, in 1988 she was diagnosed with a liver disease and underwent a liver transplant in 1990. She recovered and returned to nursing. In December 2000, Denison was approved as a nurse practitioner, a new nursing role in Australia. She provides health care services to around 1400 people living over an area of 1500 square kilometres. As part of her community nursing, Denison identified a need for activities for younger people, and established a cinema in the town. She also established a second-hand clothes shop which sold donated clothing to raise funds for rural families in need.

In 2008, Denison was awarded the Medal of the Order of Australia for services to nursing as a nurse practitioner, and to the community of the Nundle district.

Denison was also an adjunct Senior Lecturer in the School of Health at the University of New England. Then, Denison retired in 2010.

== Retirement life ==
After retiring, Denison volunteered with Lifeline. She is now a member of St. Vincent de Paul, supporting people in treatment with alcohol and substance use, at Freeman House in Armidale in NSW.
