= Lugarno =

- Suburb
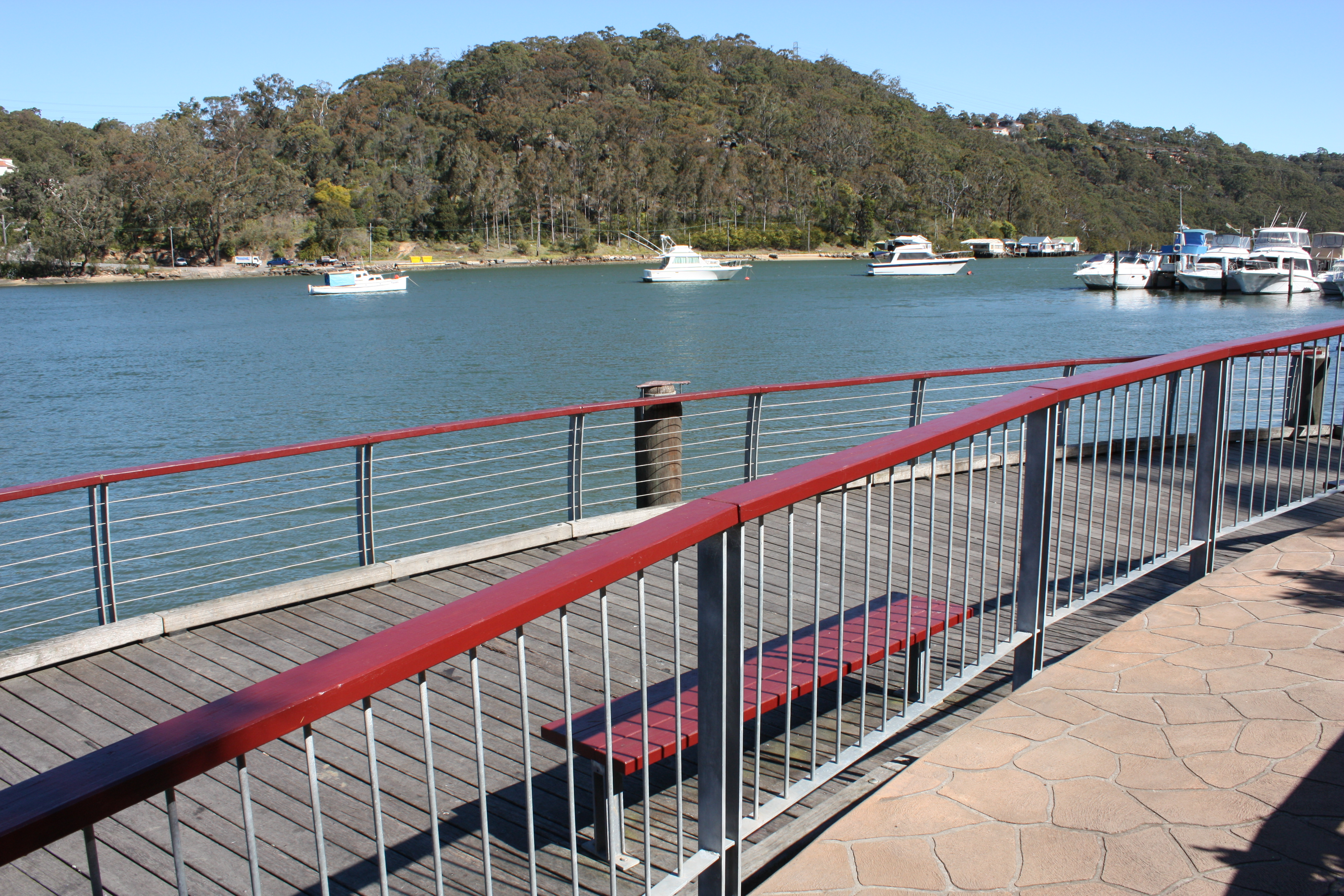
- Boardwalk and Lugarno Marina on Georges River

- Interactive map of Lugarno
- Country: Australia
- State: New South Wales
- City: Sydney
- LGA: Georges River Council
- Location: 23 km (14 mi) south-west of Sydney CBD

Government
  - State electorate: Oatley
  - Federal division: Banks
- Elevation: 72 m (236 ft)

Population
  - Total: 5,869 (2021 census)
- Postcode: 2210
Suburbs around Lugarno
Padstow Heights	Peakhurst	Peakhurst Heights
Alfords Point	Lugarno	Oatley
Illawong	Illawong	Illawong

Lugarno is a suburb situated in the St George area of southern Sydney, in the state of New South Wales, Australia. It is located in the local government area of the Georges River Council, 23 kilometres south of the Sydney central business district.

Situated on the northern bank of the Georges River, Lugarno is known for its large areas of bushland. Peakhurst and Peakhurst Heights, to the north, are the only adjoining suburbs. Nearby suburbs include Alfords Point, Illawong (on the other side of the Georges River), Padstow Heights (on the other side of Salt Pan Creek) and Oatley (on the other side of Lime Kiln Bay).

== History ==
The area now known as Lugarno lies either on the traditional lands of Dharug people or coastal Eora people, both of whom spoke a common language. It lies close to the lands of Tharawal people on the south bank of the river. There was an unofficial Aboriginal settlement at nearby Salt Pan Creek for many years. Georges River Council recognizes and acknowledges that the Biddegal/Bidjigal/Bedegal clan of the Eora are the original inhabitants and custodians of all land and water in the Georges River region.

Lime Kiln Bay once had more extensive shell middens, made over centuries by local people, the bay gets its name from early settlers burning the shells to create lime.

One of the earliest contacts between British settlers and Aboriginal people occurred on 20 January 1788. Arthur Philip and Philip Gidley King, leading a party of seamen from the First Fleet rowing two open boats, explored the 'South-West Arm of Botany Bay' (now Georges River). They are now thought to have gone as far as Lime Kiln Bay, where they landed at two locations there, the first of which they called 'Lance Point'—thought to be modern-day Gertrude Point, Lugarno—where an altercation with local people occurred. Later the same day, there was a peaceful meeting at the head of Lime Kiln Bay. Not finding enough freshwater, around Botany Bay and its two 'arms', the colonists moved on to Port Jackson, where the settlement of Sydney began six days later.

Lugarno was named after Lake Lugano, Switzerland by surveyors Major Sir Thomas Livingstone Mitchell (1792-1855) and William Govett (1807-1848) in 1843. An extra 'r' was added for the suburb name. Thomas Lawrence was granted 120 acres (0.49 km^{2}) of land in 1831, on the western side of the peninsula near Salt Pan Creek. Land grants to the east and north were made in 1856 to T.G.Lee with 113 acres (0.46 km^{2}), Frewin Sleath with 45 acres (180,000 m^{2}), John Lushy with 41 acres (170,000 m^{2}) and J.P. Henning with 40 acres (160,000 m^{2}).

The whole area between Arncliffe and Lugarno was originally heavily timbered. Illawarra Road was built by convicts in 1841 and it ran through Gannon's Forest, down to the Georges River. The road from Arncliffe was later known as Gannon's Forest Road and today is known as Forest Road. The name has been retained in Old Illawarra Road, over the river in Menai and Lucas Heights.

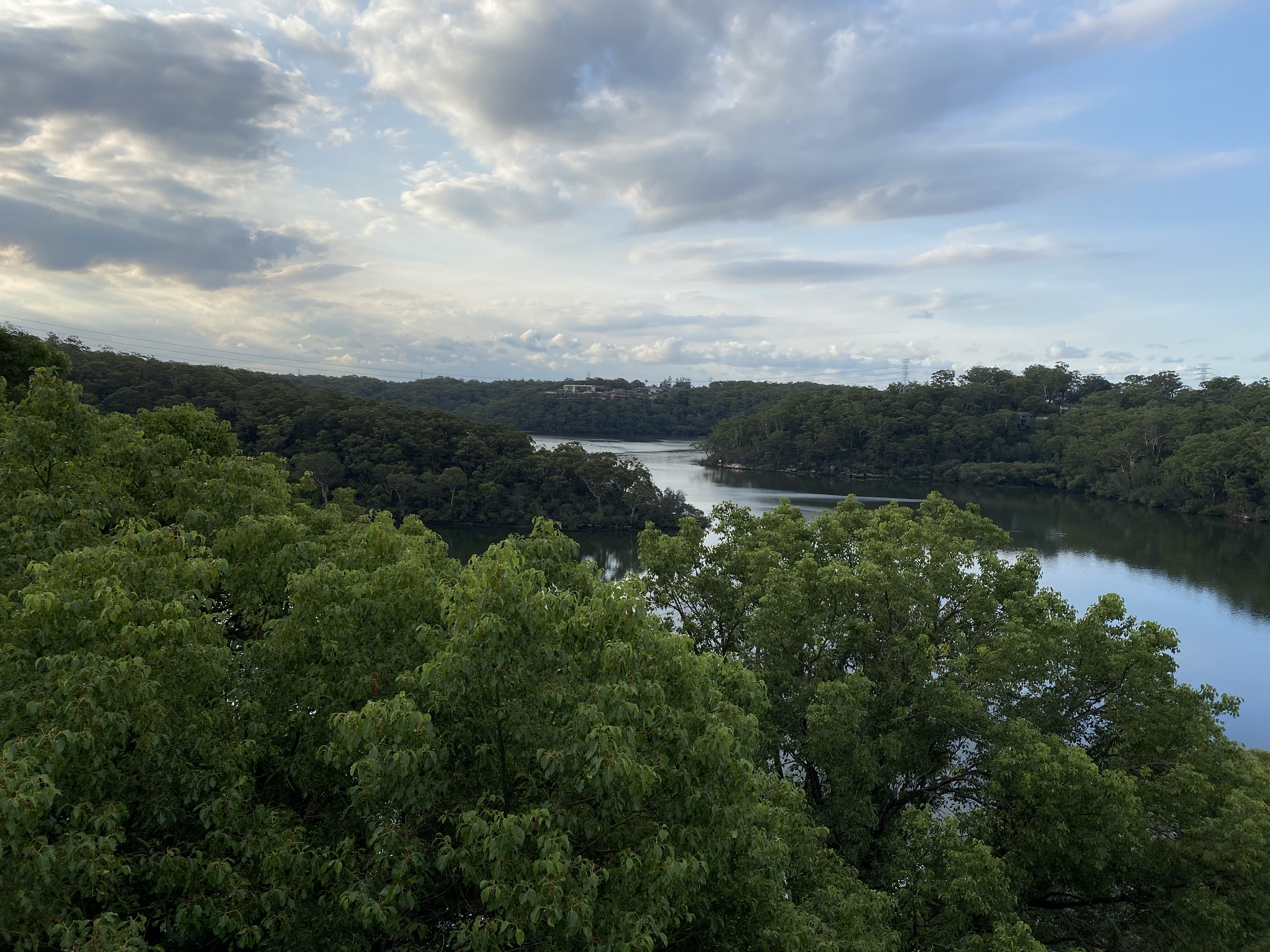
The Georges River as viewed from Lugarno

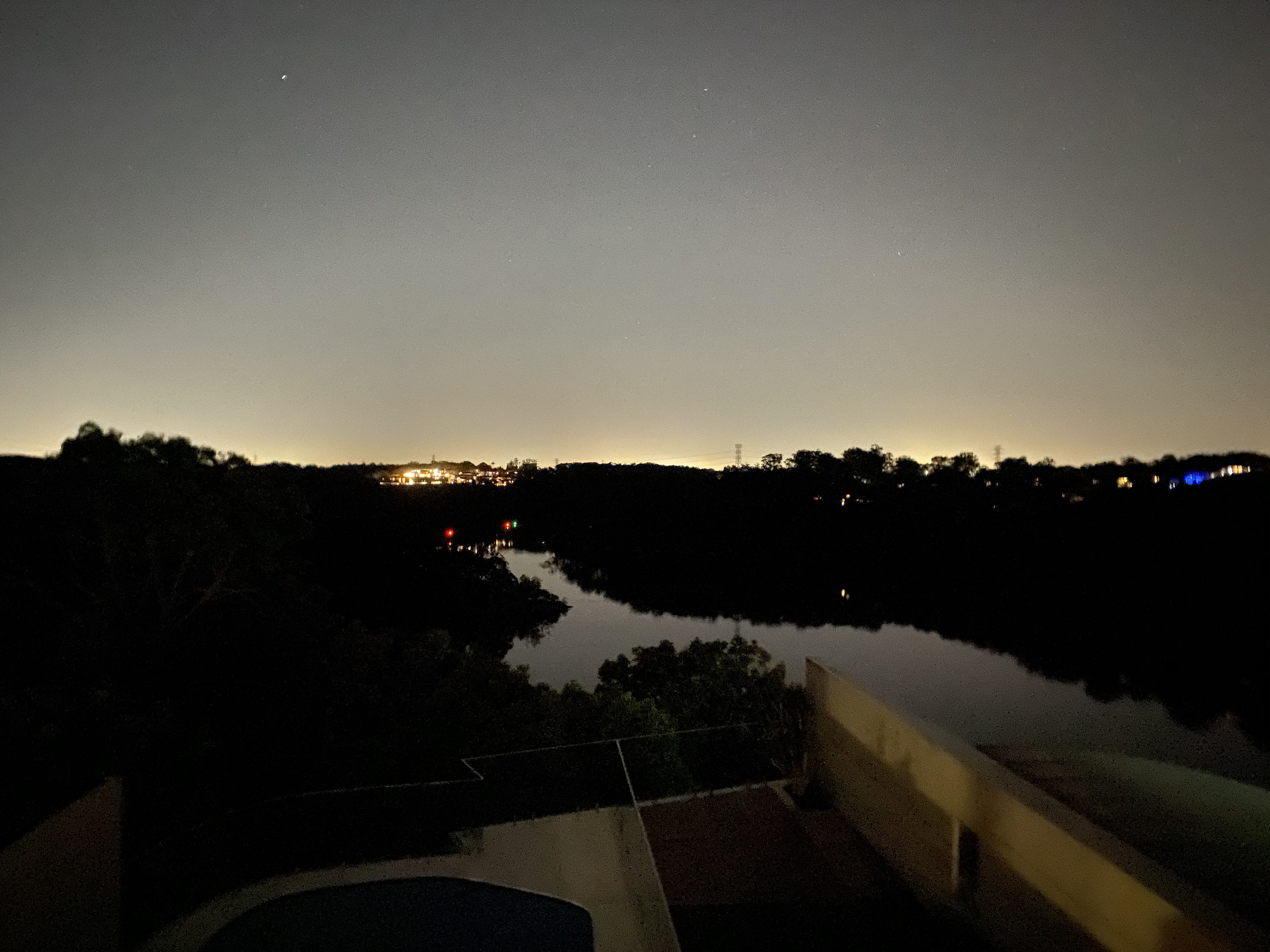
The Georges River National Park as viewed from Lugarno

A punt operated from Lugarno across the river from 1843. An established ferry serviced the area from 1887 to 1974, closing with the opening of the Alfords Point Bridge.

The furthest upstream leases of the former Georges River oyster farming industry were located off Soily Bottom Point, Lugarno. Oyster leases also existed along the foreshore, in Edith Bay, and around Lime Kiln Bay. The industry collapsed in the mid 1990s, due to QX disease.

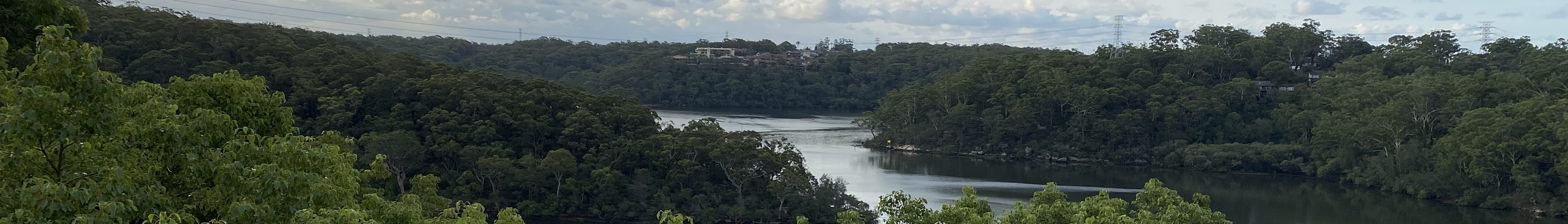
The banner of Georges River National Park and Georges River as viewed from Lugarno

From 1947, plans were made to erect a coal-fired power station, on the Georges River at 'Lugarno', but the site was actually on the southern side of the river, opposite Lugarno. There was local opposition and in the end, it did not proceed. The suburb subsequently was developed to be mainly residential, in the 1960s when land was released for home sites.

The area now known as H. V. Evatt Memorial Park lies on volcanic soil, a rarity in Sydney. It is the weathered remains of a diatreme, a type of volcanic pipe. The area was a market garden until c.1961. The pond at the north end of the park was created as an irrigation dam. After the market garden became disused, the area was threatened by housing development, until it was saved as open space and sporting fields. The natural slope of the hill was altered by excavation and levelling to create level playing fields.

== Notable people ==
Melissa Caddick grew up in Lugarno.

== Parks and waterways ==
- Georges River National Park, CF Williams Reserve, HV Evatt Park, Taylors Reserve
- Georges River, Salt Pan Creek, Soily Bottom Point, Gertrude Point, Edith Bay, Boggywell Creek, Lime Kiln Bay

== Churches ==
St Stephens Anglican Church, Lugarno-Peakhurst Uniting Church and Church of Samoa Parish of Sydney.

== Public Transport ==
Two revenue bus services operate out of Lugarno, both operated by U-Go Mobility. The 949 service runs between Lugarno and Hurstville, while the 948 service operates between Lugarno and Riverwood Station.

== Sport and recreation ==
Gannons Park is the home ground of 2 soccer clubs, Lugarno F.C. and Forest Rangers FC. H.V Evatt Park is the home ground of The Georges River Rugby Club (The Dropbears). Evatt Park is the home of rugby in the Georges River LGA and is also used by the St George Junior Baseball Club and Penshurst RSL Rugby League Club. The Lugarno-Peakhurst Uniting Church organises a netball competition which takes place at Olds Park, Penshurst.

Lugarno is home to the Lugarno Football Club in the St George Football Association. In the most recent football season, the club fielded some 42 teams (20 competition and 22 non-competition teams) and had more than 500 registered players and 102 team officials covering the age groups from the under 6's to the over 45's. The Club fields teams across both genders.

== Demographics ==
At the 2021 census, the population of Lugarno stood at 5,869. 24.6% of census respondents stated they were born overseas with the top countries of birth being China 3.5%, England 2.2%, Greece 1.3%, North Macedonia 1.2% and Egypt 1.1%. English was stated as the only language spoken at home by 71.2% of residents and the most common other languages spoken were Greek 6.4%, Arabic 3.7%, Mandarin 3.6%, Macedonian 2.2% and Cantonese 2.2%. The most common responses for religious affiliation were Catholic 28.6%, No Religion 22.7% and Orthodox 13.8%.

== Education ==
Lugarno is home to only one educational institution, Lugarno Public School, which opened in 1933.

== Gallery ==
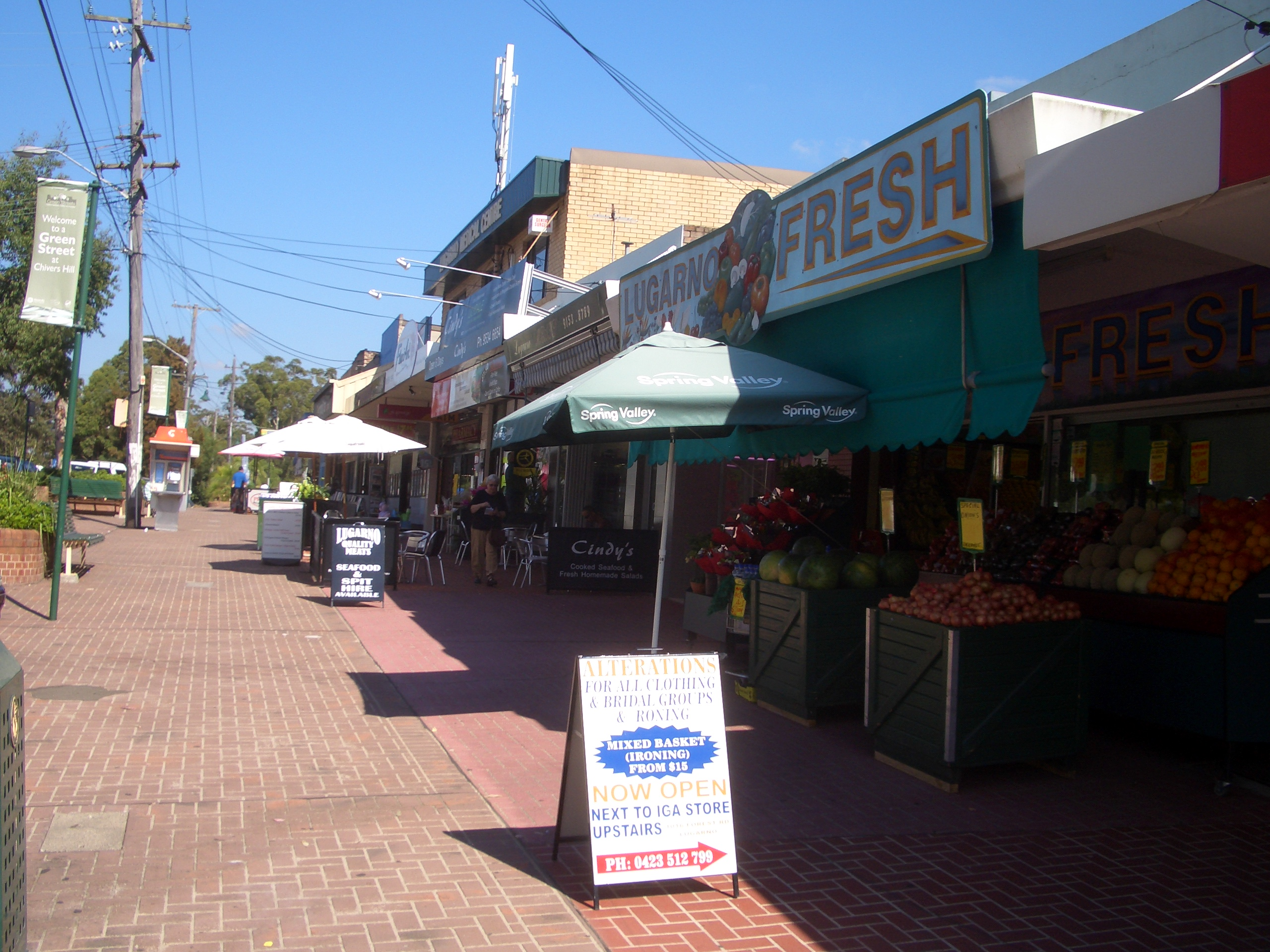
Forest Road, Lugarno

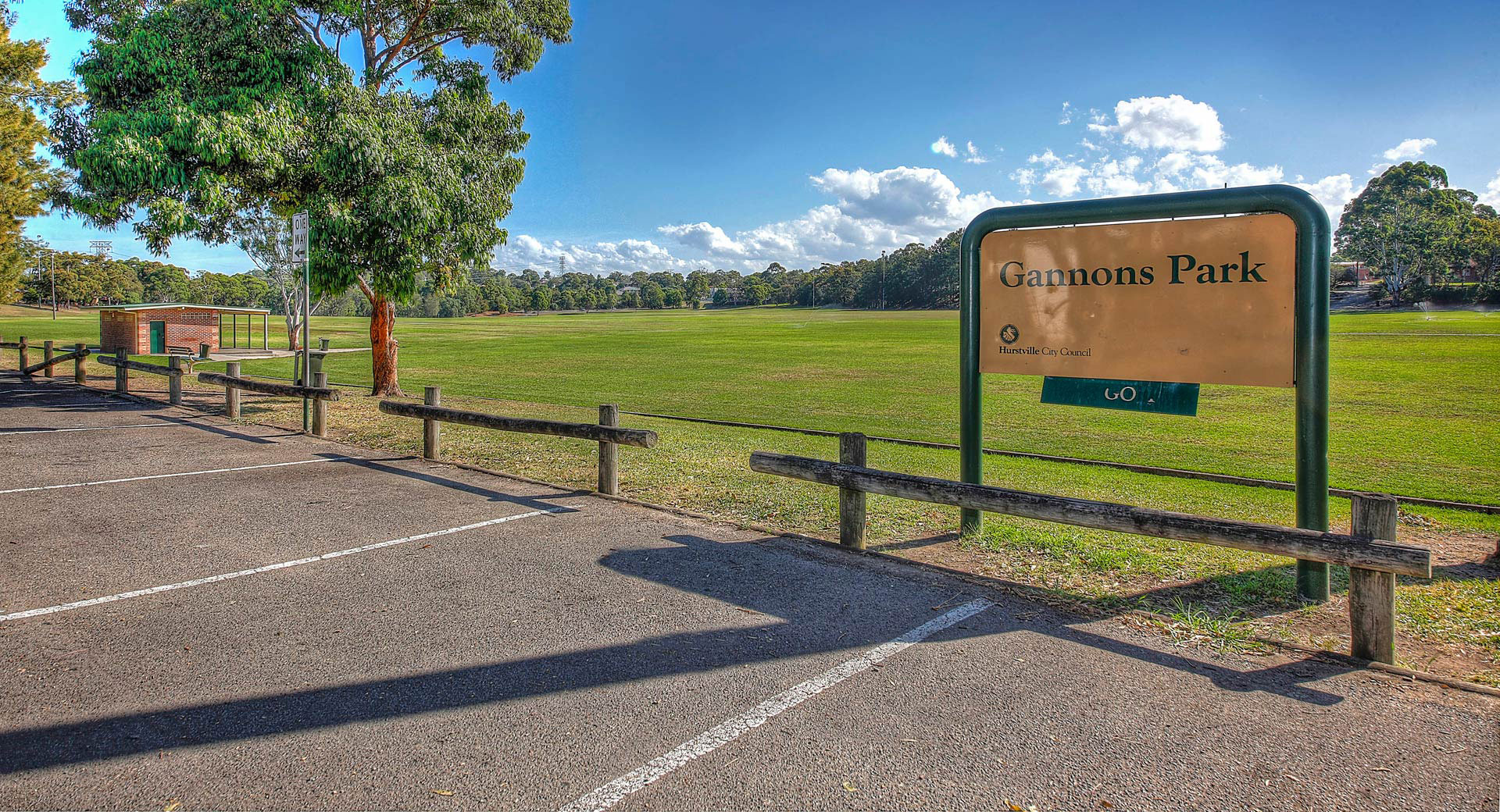
Gannons Park, Lugarno
