= Peakhurst Heights =

- Suburb
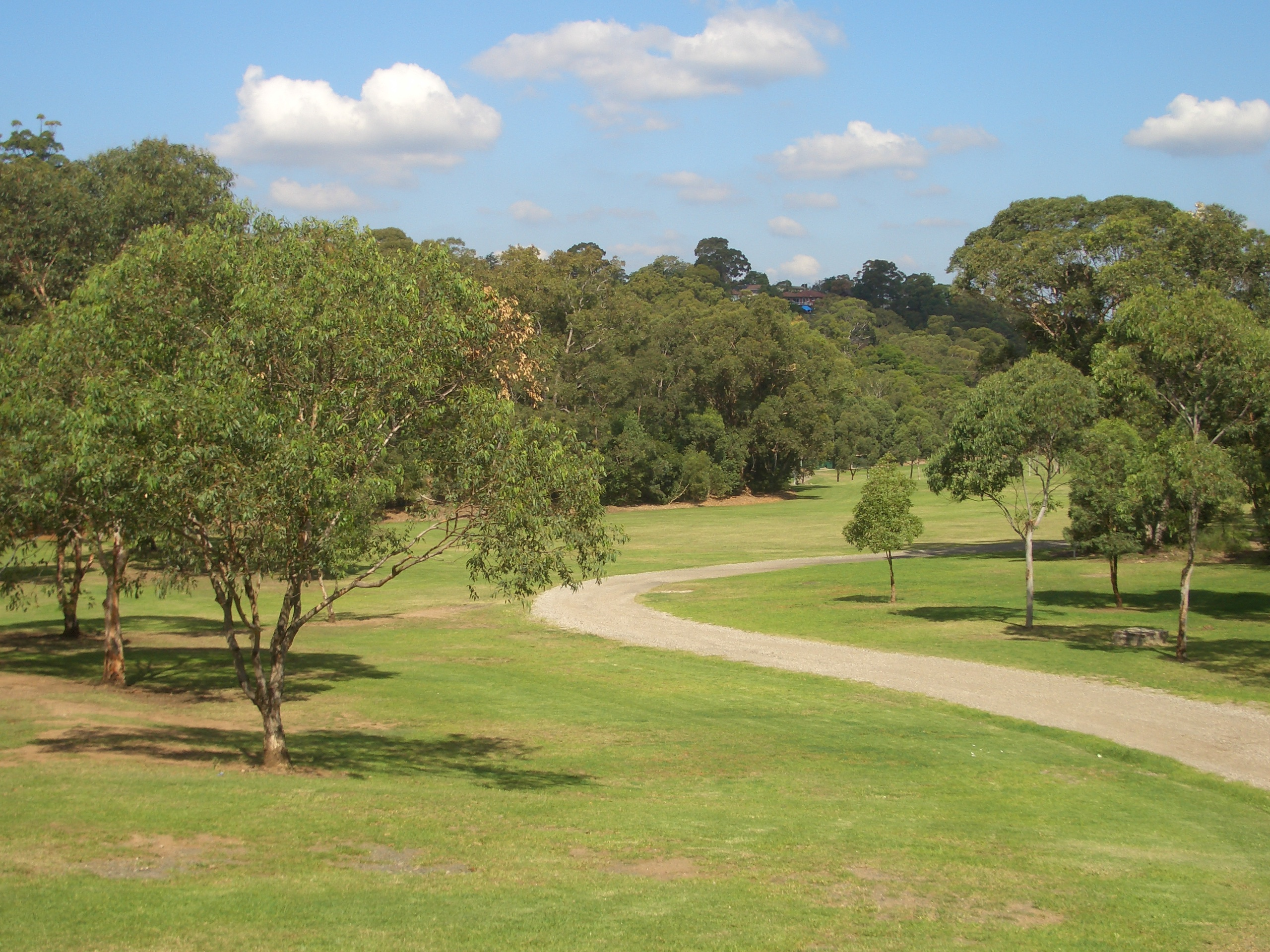
- Gannons Park, Peakhurst Heights

- Interactive map of Peakhurst Heights
- Country: Australia
- State: New South Wales
- City: Sydney
- LGA: Georges River Council
- Location: 22 km (14 mi) south of Sydney CBD
- Established: 1995

Government
  - State electorate: Oatley
  - Federal division: Banks
- Elevation: 50 m (160 ft)

Population
  - Total: 2,524 (2021 census)
- Postcode: 2210
Suburbs around Peakhurst Heights
Peakhurst	Peakhurst	Mortdale
Lugarno	Peakhurst Heights	Mortdale
Lugarno	Lugarno	Oatley

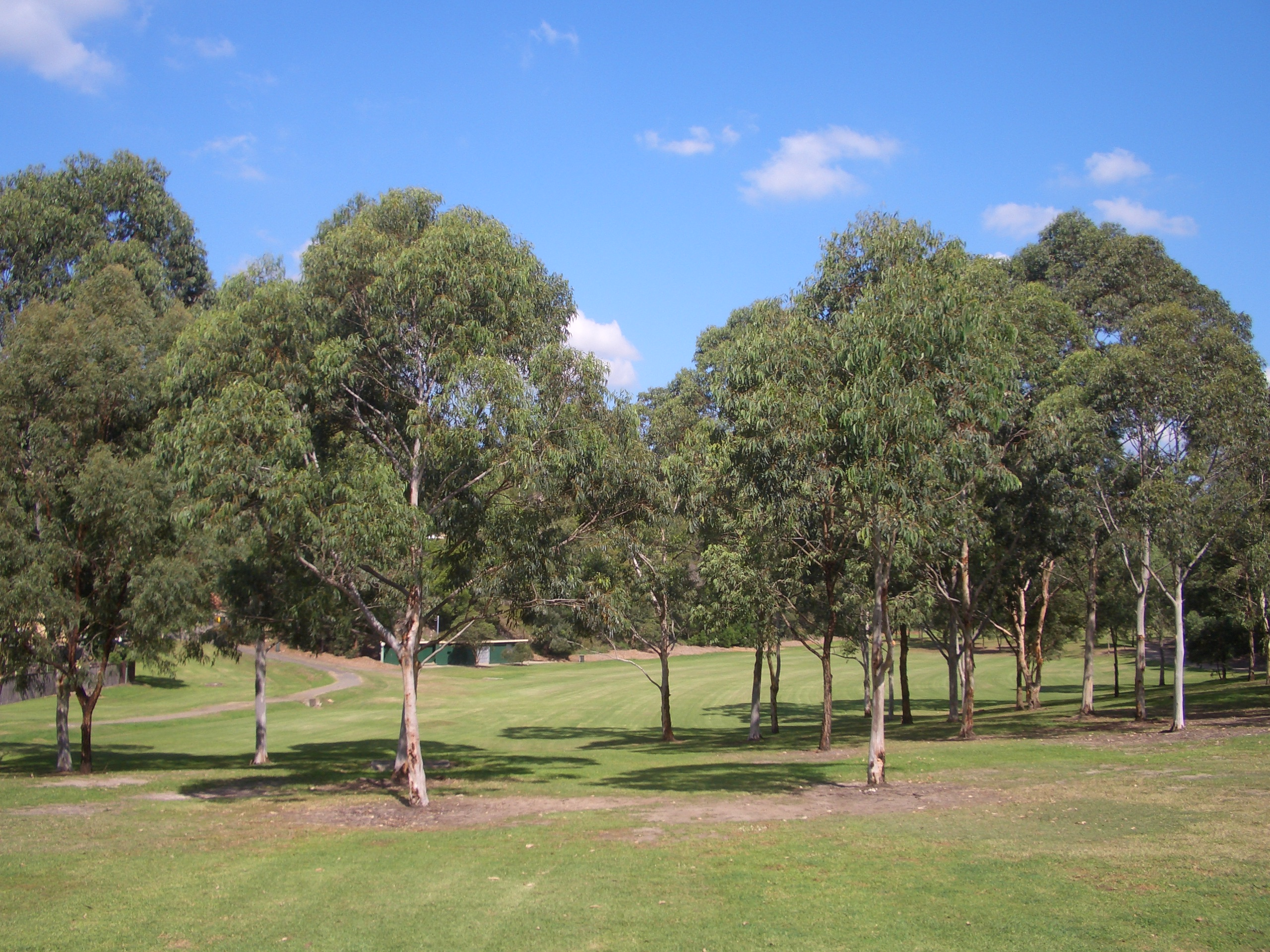
Gannons Park, Peakhurst Heights

Peakhurst Heights is a suburb in southern Sydney, in the state of New South Wales, Australia. Peakhurst Heights is located 22 kilometres south of the Sydney central business district and is part of the St George area. Peakhurst Heights is in the local government area of the Georges River Council.

Peakhurst is a separate suburb to the north. Peakhurst Heights is bordered by Boggywell Creek and Lime Kiln Bay, on the Georges River. The shores of Lime Kiln Bay once had Aboriginal middens that were used by shell-gatherers.

== Parks ==
Peakhurst Heights is a mainly residential area. Gannons Park is a large recreation area in the north west corner and Hurstville Golf Course sits on the eastern border.

== Commercial area ==
A small group of shops is located on Pindari Road. Peakhurst South Public School is located nearby.

== History ==
Peakhurst was named after landholder John Robert Peake. The area was originally part of a land grant to Captain John Townson. John Robert Peake bought 10 acres (40,000 m^{2}) of land from William Hebblewhite in 1838. Peake donated land for the first Methodist church built in 1856. School Inspector Huffer suggested that Peake's name be used when the public school was founded in 1871 and it was later adopted by the suburb. The post office opened in 1885.

Peakhurst Heights was a locality in the suburb of Peakhurst, until it was recognised as a separate suburb in 1995.

Also known originally as Peakhurst South.

== Demographics ==
According to the 2021 census, there were 2,524 people usually resident in Peakhurst Heights. 77.4% stated they were born in Australia with the top countries of overseas birth being China (3.2%), Greece (1.8%), England (1.5%), New Zealand (1.0%) and Italy (0.9%). English was stated as the only language spoken at home by 71.9% of residents and the most common other languages spoken were Greek (5.7%), Arabic (4.0%), Mandarin (3.5%), Cantonese (2.4%) and Macedonian (2.2%). The most common responses for religious affiliation were Catholic (28.0%), No Religion (23.9%), Anglican (13.7%) and Orthodox (12.6%).

== Events ==
Each Christmas Eve the residents of Peakhurst Heights congregate on the streets. Houses are adorned with Christmas lights and decorations and the streets are lined with candles as inspired by the Spanish tradition of Noche Buena. The last Friday of every month at the courtyard of Our Lady of Fatima Catholic Church Peakhurst there is a Farmers Market Event where a various amount of different foods are together for everyone to enjoy.
