= Electoral district of Oatley =

Oatley New South Wales—Legislative Assembly
- Interactive map of district boundaries from the 2023 state election
- State: New South Wales
- Dates current: 1927–1930; 2007–present
- MP: Mark Coure
- Party: Liberal Party
- Namesake: Oatley
- Electors: 53,780 (2019)
- Area: 28.46 km^{2} (11.0 sq mi)
- Demographic: Outer-metropolitan
Electorates around Oatley:
East Hills	Bankstown	Canterbury
East Hills	Oatley	Kogarah
Miranda	Miranda	Miranda

Oatley is an electoral district of the Legislative Assembly in the Australian state of New South Wales in Sydney's St George district. It is currently held by Mark Coure of the Liberal Party.

== Geography ==
On its current boundaries, Oatley takes in the suburbs of Connells Point, Hurstville Grove, Kyle Bay, Lugarno, Mortdale, Oatley, Peakhurst, Peakhurst Heights and parts of Beverly Hills, Blakehurst, Hurstville, Narwee, Penshurst, Riverwood and South Hurstville.

== History ==
Oatley was first created in 1927, with the breakup of the multi-member St George. In 1930, it was abolished and largely replaced by Kogarah. It was recreated for the 2007 election largely replacing the abolished district of Georges River.

== Members for Oatley ==
First incarnation (1927—1930)
Member	Party	Term
Mark Gosling	Labor	1927–1930
Second incarnation (2007—present)
Member	Party	Term
Kevin Greene	Labor	2007–2011
Mark Coure	Liberal	2011–present

== Election results ==
2023 New South Wales state election: Oatley
Party	Candidate	Votes	%	±%
Liberal	Mark Coure	22,877	45.6	−5.3
Labor	Ash Ambihaipahar	19,851	39.5	+3.8
Greens	Taylor Vandijk	3,101	6.2	−0.3
Independent	Natalie Mort	2,677	5.3	+5.3
Sustainable Australia	Glenn Hunt	1,690	3.4	+3.4
Total formal votes		50,196	96.9	+0.2
Informal votes		1,625	3.1	−0.2
Turnout		51,821	90.4	−2.4
Two-party-preferred result
Liberal	Mark Coure	23,959	50.8	−6.0
Labor	Ash Ambihaipahar	23,205	49.2	+6.0
Liberal hold		Swing	−6.0	
