= Penshurst railway station, Sydney =

Railway station in Sydney, New South Wales, Australia

Penshurst
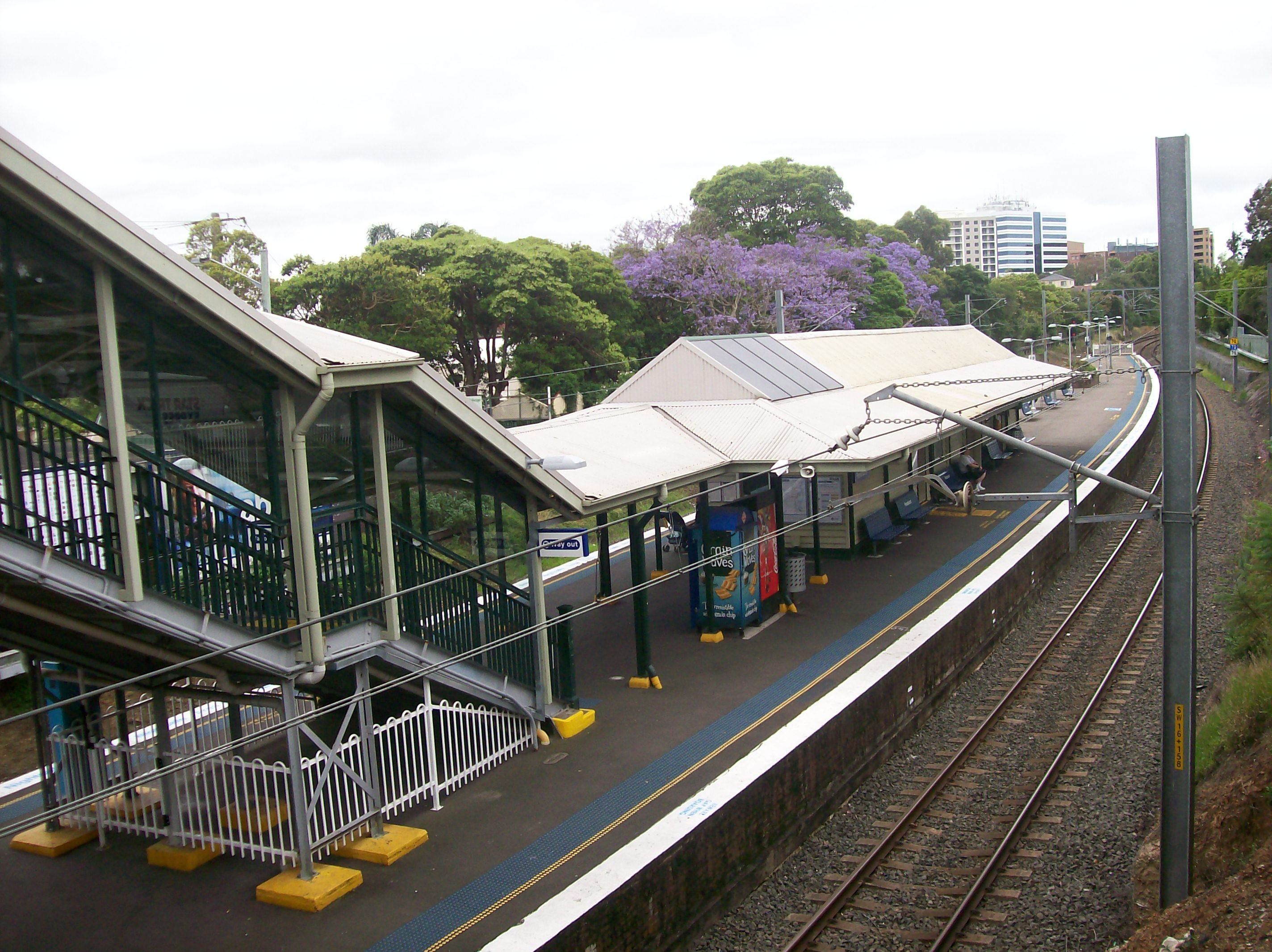
- Northbound view of Platform 1 in January 2008

General information
- Location: Bridge Street, Penshurst; Sydney, New South Wales; Australia
- Coordinates: 33°57′58″S 151°05′21″E
- Elevation: 62 metres (203 ft)
- Owner: Transport Asset Manager of NSW
- Operator: Sydney Trains
- Line: South Coast
- Distance: 16.13 km (10.02 mi) from Central
- Platforms: 2 (1 island)
- Tracks: 2
- Connections: Bus

Construction
- Structure type: Ground
- Accessible: Yes

Other information
- Status: Weekdays: Staffed: 6am to 7pm: Weekends and public holidays: Staffed: 8am to 4pm
- Station code: PHS
- Website: Transport for NSW

History
- Opened: 1886 (140 years ago)
- Rebuilt: 4 April 1905 (121 years ago)
- Electrified: Yes (from 1926)

Passengers
- 2025: 1,467,106 (year); 4,019 (daily) (Sydney Trains)
- Rank: 99

Services
Preceding station	Sydney Trains	Following station
Mortdale towards Waterfall or Cronulla	Eastern Suburbs & Illawarra Line	Hurstville towards Bondi Junction
Location

Penshurst railway station is a suburban railway station located on the South Coast line, serving the Sydney suburb of Penshurst. It is served by Sydney Trains T4 Eastern Suburbs & Illawarra Line services.

== History ==
Penshurst station opened in 1886 being relocated south to its current location in 1905.

The station received an upgrade and 2 new lifts in January 2007.

== Services ==
=== Platforms ===
Platform	Line	Stopping pattern	Notes
1	Eastern Suburbs & Illawarra Line	services to Bondi Junction	
2	Eastern Suburbs & Illawarra Line	services to Cronulla, Waterfall & Helensburgh	

=== Transport Links ===
U-Go Mobility operates three bus routes via Penshurst station, under contract to Transport for NSW:

- 940: Hurstville to Bankstown via Riverwood
- 941: Hurstville to Chullora Marketplace (Greenacre)
- 945: Hurstville to Bankstown via Mortdale

Penshurst station is served by one NightRide route:

- N10: Sutherland to Town Hall station
