= Mortdale =

Suburb of Sydney, Australia

- Suburb
- Morts Road, Mortdale

- Interactive map of Mortdale
- Coordinates: 33°58′10″S 151°04′11″E
- Country: Australia
- State: New South Wales
- City: Sydney
- LGA: Georges River Council
- Location: 17 km (11 mi) south of Sydney CBD
- Established: 1885

Government
  - State electorate: Oatley
  - Federal division: Banks
- Elevation: 43 m (141 ft)

Population
  - Total: 10,745 (2021 census)
- Postcode: 2223
Suburbs around Mortdale
Peakhurst	Beverly Hills	Penshurst
	Mortdale
Peakhurst Heights	Oatley	Hurstville Grove

Mortdale Memorial Park

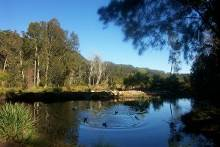
Lime Kiln Bay

Mortdale is a suburb located in southern Sydney, in the state of New South Wales, Australia. Mortdale is located 20 kilometres south of the Sydney central business district and is part of the St George area. Mortdale is situated in the local government area of Georges River Council. Mortdale extends south to Lime Kiln Bay, on the Georges River. Mortdale Heights is a locality in the western corner of the suburb.

== History ==
Mortdale has been known in the past as Mort's Road, Mort's Hill, Mort's Crossing, Mort's Township and Mort Dale. The suburb was named after Sydney industrialist Thomas Sutcliffe Mort (1816–1878), who was famous for pioneering the refrigeration of shipping meat and the construction of Mort's Dock, Balmain. Mort purchased the land from Robert Townson (1763–1827) around 1850, who had early been granted land in the Hurstville area with his brother John Townson. Shortly after this a small farming community started on the land around Mort's Road which was subdivided into seventeen farms.

In 1884 the Hurstville Steam Brick Company, better known as Judds Brickworks, was established by William George Judd. The building of the brickworks encouraged development and houses were soon built opposite the Brickworks.

Also in the 1880s the railway was extended through Mortdale and it divided two of the main farms, Kemp's orange orchard and Parkes's farm near Victoria Avenue; later, by 1894, these were subdivided for housing. The official title for the suburb was set as Mortdale when the railway station opened with that name on 20 March 1897.

The school opened in January 1889, and the post office and grocery store opened in November. Mortdale became a popular residential suburb in 1920s for soldiers returning from World War I.

In 1921, there was a movement for Mortdale to split from Hurstville and form a separate municipality. An official 1923 inquiry into the proposed Municipality of Mortdale decided against the change, despite the separation movement having the law behind them.

At the same time there was also a push to change the name of Mortdale, because of its similarity with the suburb of Mortlake and the association with its literal translation from Latin ('Valley of the Dead'). Suggestions by various groups over several years included: Leyton, Montrose, Morella, Kingrose and Boronia. A final list approved by the Department of Lands were: Carruthers, Princemead, Wyargine, and Storrieville, but the matter was never resolved.

In 1992, local entertainer and cabaret singer Su Cruickshank published her memoir and cookbook, Bring A Plate to The Mortdale Scout Hall, putting Mortdale's post-war community hall culture in the national spotlight.

== Commercial area ==
Mortdale consists mainly of residential dwellings with some commercial and industrial developments in the north-west corner. The main shopping centre is located on Morts Road and Pitt Street, near Mortdale railway station. Commercial and industrial developments are located along Boundary Road.

A number of streets near the commercial area are named after notable streets in the Sydney CBD; These include: George Street, Martin Place, Pitt Street, Macquarie Place and Oxford Street. This is the only group of Sydney-wide streets named as such.

Mortdale Fire Station

Mortdale Hotel

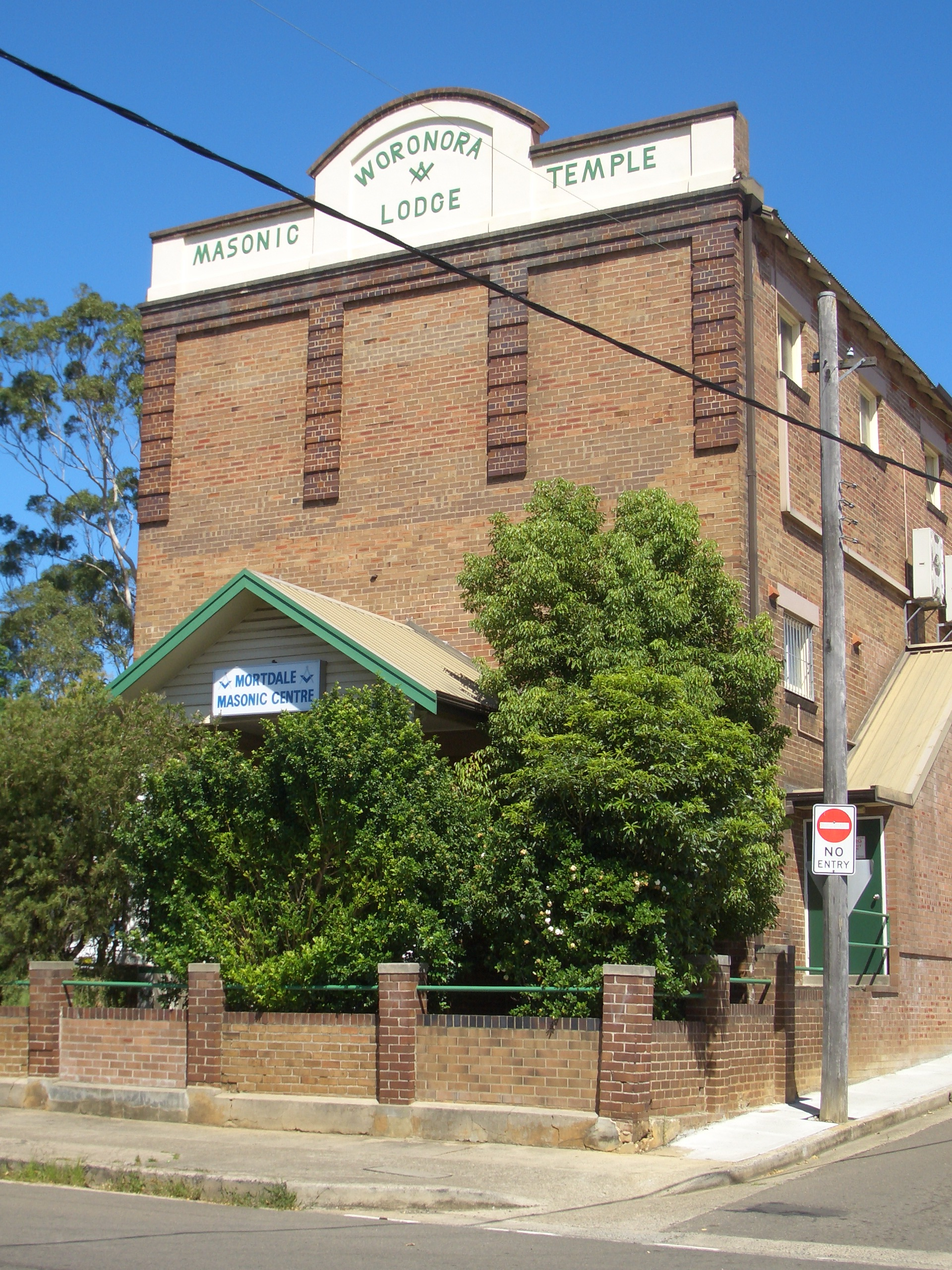
Woronora Lodge, Mortdale Masonic Centre (now demolished)

== Transport ==
Mortdale railway station is on the Illawarra railway line of the Sydney Trains network. Mortdale is a 30min (approx) train journey from the city. Mortdale sits on the T4 trainline, which may help to avoid delays as this line is separate from the rest of the network. U-Go Mobility services 944, 945 and 955 run throughout the week, with limited services on weekends.

== Churches ==
- Christ Church Anglican
- Mortdale Uniting Church
- Mortdale Oatley Baptist Church
- Church of Jesus Christ of Latter Day Saints (Mormons)
- Hurstville District Christadelphian Ecclesia
- Mortdale Spiritual Church

== Schools ==
- Mortdale Public School
- Carinya Special School
- Marist College Penshurst
- Penshurst West Public School

== Parks and Waterways ==
- Mortdale Memorial Park, Renown Park, Jubilee Park, Hurstville Golf Course, Mick Downes Reserve, Oatley Heights Park, Lime Kiln Bay Reserve, Olds Park, Edith Park, Beatty Street Reserve, Ruby Wing Reserve, Paddy Tyler Reserve, Milsop Place Reserve, Sunlea Avenue Reserve, Treloar Avenue Reserve, Walter Street Reserve, Nicol Murray Reserve, Lesley Crescent Reserve.
- Georges River, Lime Kiln Bay, Dairy Creek

== Landmarks ==
- Historic Buildings - Mortdale Fire Station, Old Police Station, Mortdale Hotel, Mortdale railway station, Mortdale RSL Club, Mortdale Bowling Club (demolished 2012), St George Masonic Club, Mortdale Scout Hall, Mortdale Senior Citizens Centre, Ellen Subway underpass.
- Mortdale Memorial Park - Contains a perimeter of large Small-leaved Fig trees, a classical rotunda and a decorative War Memorial. The park is popular for picnics, weddings, and concerts.

== Sport ==
- Hurstville Golf Course - 18-hole golf course
- Ken Rosewall Tennis Centre - 8 tennis courts adjoining the golf course
- Renown United Rugby League Club - play at Renown Park, Mortdale
- Mortdale Heights Cricket Club - play at Oatley Park Oval
- Hurstville Small Bore Range - rimfire shooting rifle range opposite the golf course
- Beatty Street Reserve - Cricket Nets
- Jubilee Park - netball court

== Pop culture ==
In 1992, Su Cruickshank, published a book entitled 'Bring A Plate to The Mortdale Scout Hall - The Autobiography of a Fat Tart Complete with Recipes'.

== Demographics ==
According to the 2021 census, there were 10745 people usually resident in Mortdale, being 49.4% male and 50.6% female, median age 40 years. 34.9% stated they were born overseas, with the top countries of birth being China 7.7%, Nepal 2.3%, England 2.2% and Hong Kong 1.6%. English was stated as the only language spoken at home by 62.6% of residents, and the most common other languages spoken were Mandarin 8.1%, Cantonese 5.2%, Greek 2.9%, Macedonian 2.7%, and Nepali 2.4% . The most common responses for religious affiliation were no religion 32.1%, Catholic 24.4%, Anglican 11.2% and Orthodox 8.0%, with religion not stated being 4.7%.

Mortdale households consisted of 50.3% occupied by two-parent families, single parent families 12.9%, 35.2% by couples with no children at home, and 1.4% by others. 31.8% of households were purchasing their homes, 28.7% were renting, and 37.3% were owned outright (others not stated).

There were 56.4% of these in separate houses, semi-detached 13.8%, and 29% in apartments. 41.0% had one vehicle, and 34.7% had 2.

== Notable residents ==
- Reg Gasnier - St George Rugby league footballer
- J. H. Leonard - illustrator
- Billy Smith - St George Rugby league footballer
- Ruby Violet Payne-Scott (1912-1981) - physicist, radio astronomer and schoolteacher

== Mortdale Heights ==
Mortdale Heights is a waterfront locality located between the Georges River and the western edge of the suburb of Mortdale in southern Sydney, in the state of New South Wales, Australia. Mortdale Heights is located 20 kilometres south of the Sydney central business district in the local government area of the Georges River Council.

This small, elevated area is bounded on the south by Oatley Heights Park and Lime Kiln Bay, and on the west by Hurstville Golf Course. It is known for the unusual choice of its street names, as most begin with the letter "B" and have a Scottish heritage.

== History ==
The name "Mortdale Heights" was in use by 1919, but there only scattered residences in the area. The estate was not fully subdivided for sale until 1924 when a subdivision of 300 allotments was made available. The area did not fully develop until shortly after World War II.

== Culture ==
- A row of around 12 shops was built along Balmoral Road during the 1950s. Many of these have since been converted into residences
- Beatty Street Reserve incorporates part of an old Quarry site (originally known as Hannon's Quarry) that was cleared by the Mortdale Heights Progress Association in 1954. A children's playground was built on the top section in 1955. Cricket nets were later installed in the quarry section.
- The Girl Guides Hall is situated beside Beatty Street Reserve
- The Mortdale Heights Cricket Club was founded in 1957 and is one of the oldest clubs participating in the Georges River St George District Cricket Association's competitions. Their home games are played at Oatley Park Oval
- Lime Kiln Bay Reserve, Oatley Heights Park, is a natural bushland area surrounding Lime Kiln Bay which extends into nearby Oatley Park
