= Penshurst, New South Wales =

Penshurst
- Suburb
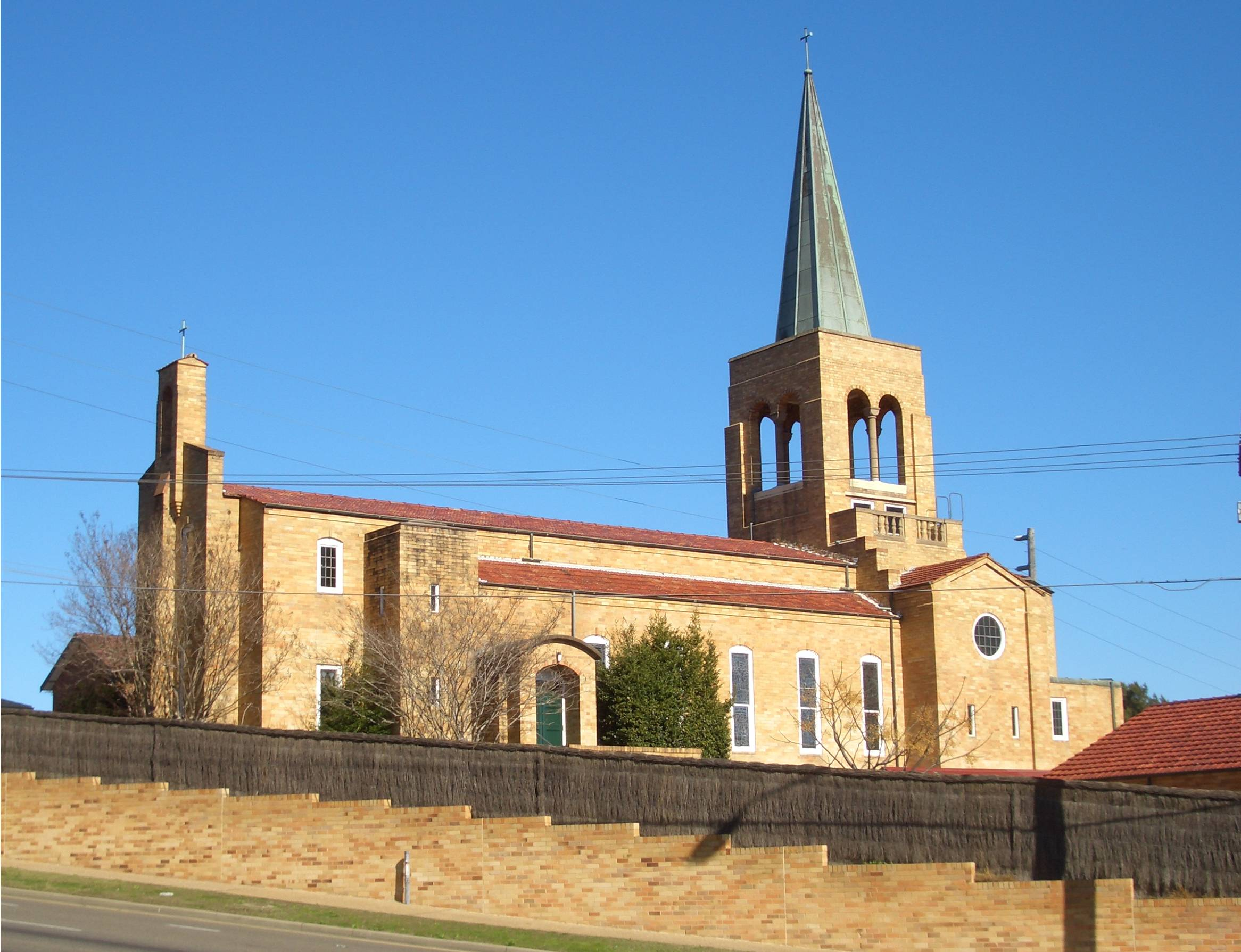
- St Johns Anglican Church, King Georges Road

- Interactive map of Penshurst
- Country: Australia
- State: New South Wales
- City: Sydney
- LGA: Georges River Council
- Location: 17 km (11 mi) south-west of Sydney CBD
- Established: 1884

Government
  - State electorates: Oatley; Kogarah
  - Federal divisions: Banks; Barton
- Elevation: 56 m (184 ft)

Population
  - Total: 12,592 (2021 census)
- Postcode: 2222
Suburbs around Penshurst
Mortdale	Beverly Hills	Beverly Hills
Mortdale	Penshurst	Hurstville
Oatley	Hurstville Grove	Hurstville

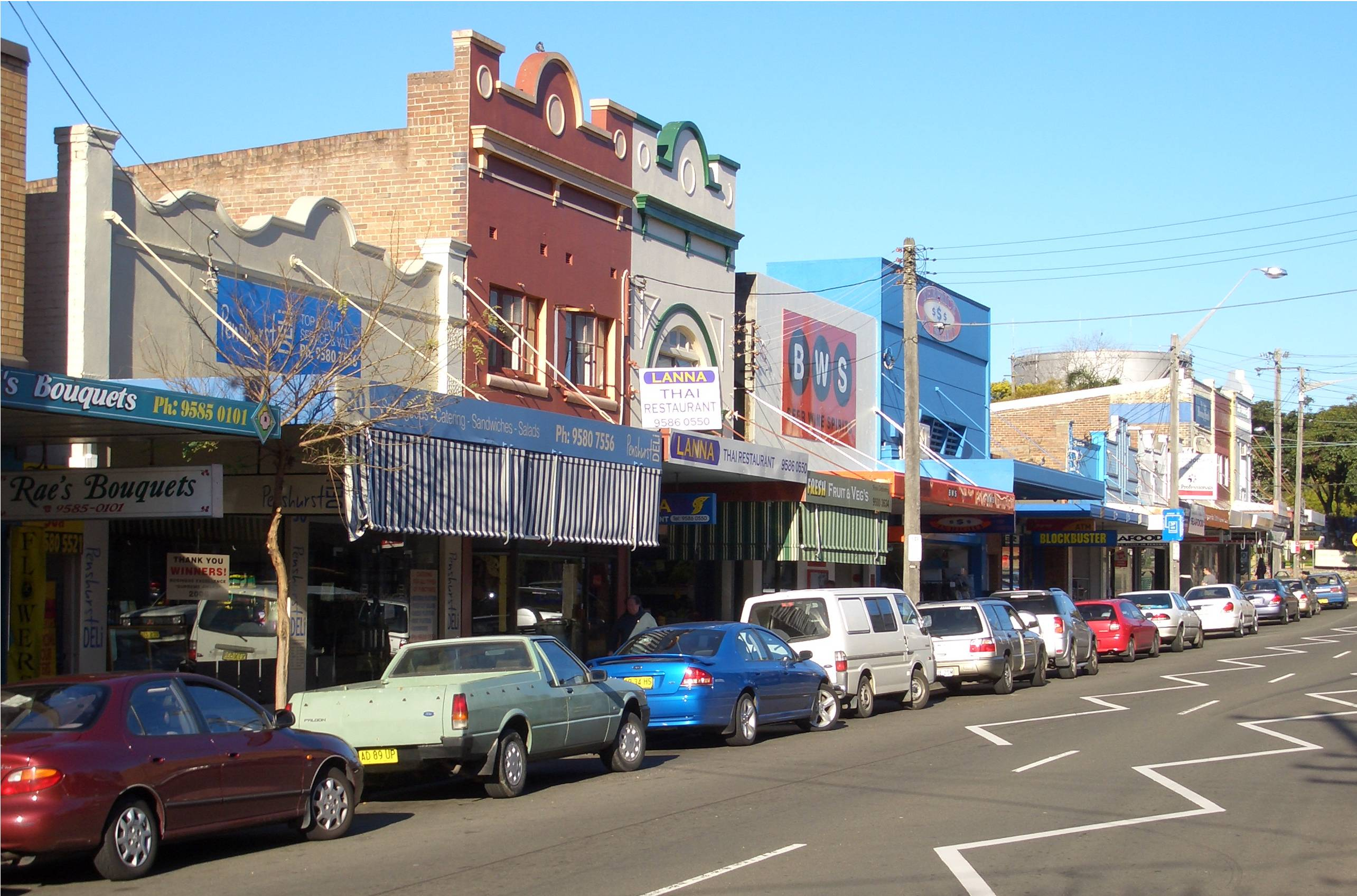
Penshurst Street

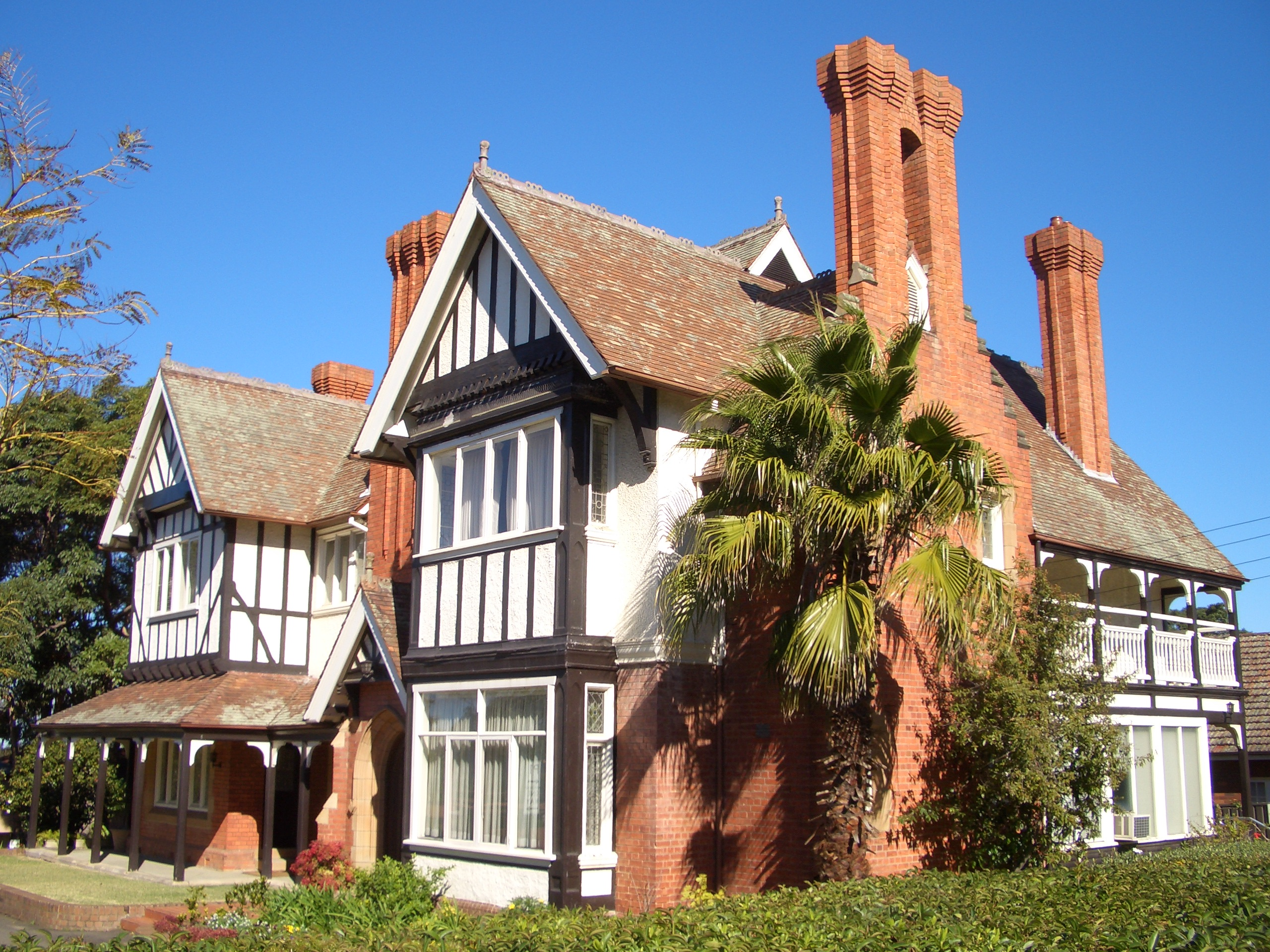
West Maling, King Georges Road, one of the earliest examples of the Queen Anne style in Australia

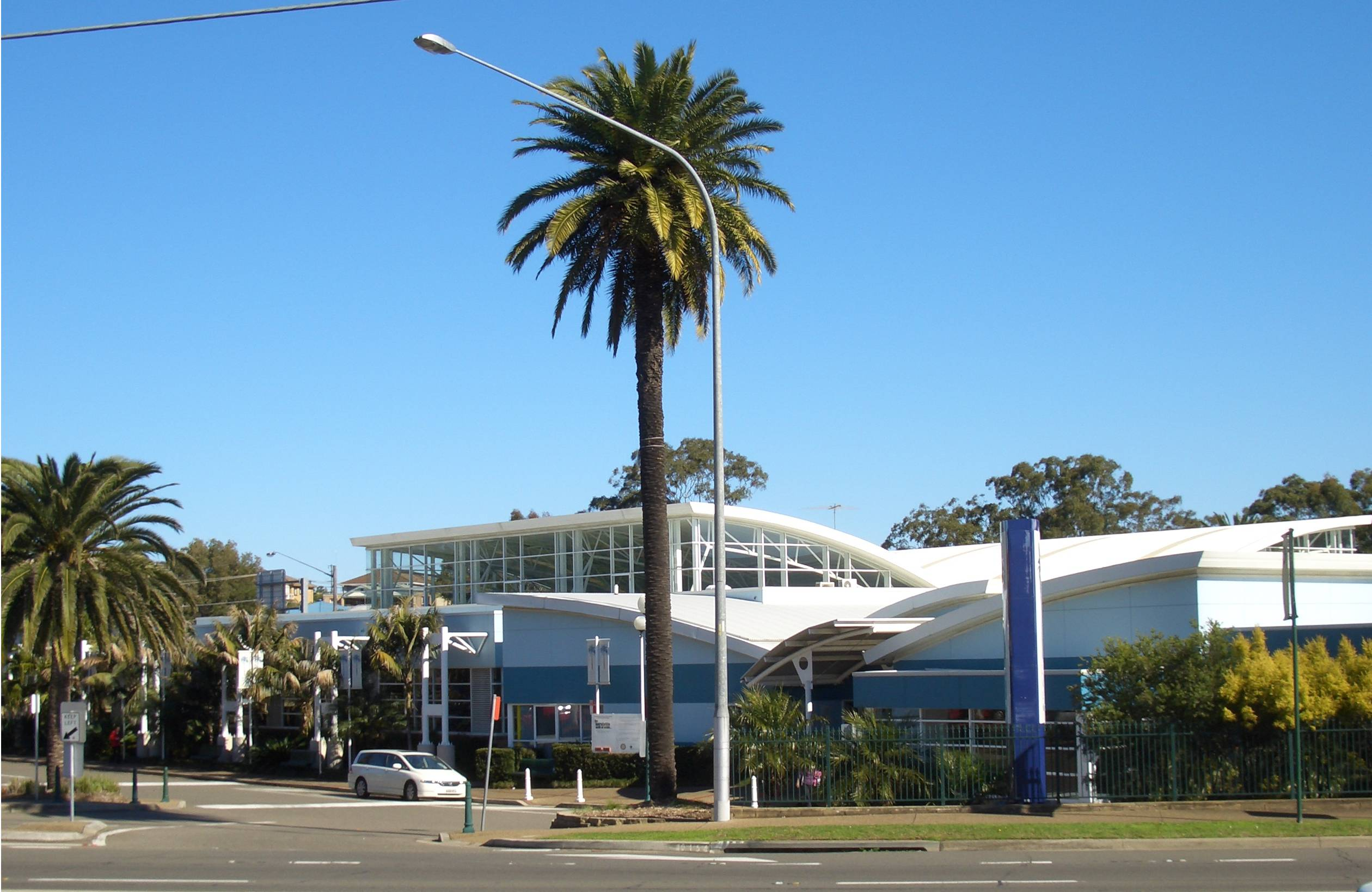
Hurstville Aquatic Leisure Centre, King Georges Road

Penshurst (/pɛnzhɜːrst/) is a suburb in southern Sydney, in the state of New South Wales, Australia. Penshurst is located 17 kilometres south of the Sydney central business district it is part of the St George area, and part of the Georges River Council local government area.

Penshurst features low to medium-density housing.

== History ==
Penshurst was named after Penshurst, Kent, England. Originally part of the land grant to Robert Townson (1763–1827), the land was acquired in 1830 by John Connell, who left it to his grandsons J.C. and E.P. Laycock. Connell's Bush was subdivided by the Laycocks and the western part sold to Thomas Sutcliffe Mort.

The early work in the area was timber-cutting and small farming. The railway station opened 17 May 1890. A large portion of Penshurst located south of the railway line is referred to as the MacRae's Estate, as it was once owned by the MacRae family. This particular area is now between Laycock Road and Grove Avenue, and Hillcrest and Railway Parade. The original homestead is still present on Laycock Road, along with a caretakers house for the stables. McRaes Reserve used to have a river running through it and the path of that river is now replaced with an underground rainwater system.

== Heritage listings ==
Penshurst has a number of heritage-listed sites, including:

- 663–665 King Georges Road: West Maling
- Laycock Road: Penshurst Reservoirs

== Commercial area ==
The main shopping centre is located around Penshurst railway station on Penshurst Street, Bridge Street and The Strand. Commercial developments are also found along Forest Road and King Georges Road. The Penshurst RSL Club is a centre of social activity. The area also contains The Gamesmen Store and Museum, dedicated to video games since 1982.

== Transport ==
Penshurst railway station is on the Illawarra Line of the Sydney Trains network. It is approximately 27 minutes from Sydney Central via train. The main roads through Penshurst are King Georges Road and Forest Road. U-Go Mobility also operates bus services 941 and 943 in Penshurst.

== Places of worship ==
- St Declan's Roman Catholic Church
- St John Anglican Church
- St Andrew Presbyterian
- Penshurst Uniting Church
- Penshurst Mosque (Australian Bosnian Islamic Society)
- Penshurst Jehovahs Witnesses Kingdom Hall
- Penshurst Assemblies of God Church
- Revival Life Centre
- Penshurst General Church of New Jerusalem

Spark church

== Schools ==
- George's River College Penshurst Campus
- Marist College Penshurst
- St Declans Catholic Primary School
- Penshurst Public School
- Penshurst West Primary School
- Hurstville Grove Infants School

== Sport and recreation ==
Penshurst local attractions include an Aquatic Centre, a park and tennis courts. Penshurst RSL Junior Rugby League Club, part of the St. George District Junior Rugby League competition, is a rugby league club that operates from HV Evatt Park in nearby Lugarno.

Penshurst has a local cricket club and play in the St George District Cricket Association and have been established for over 50 years.

They are based at Olds Park which also includes their soccer club.

Penshurst Park and Hurstville Aquatic Leisure Centre are located on King Georges Road.

Parks:

- Penshurst Park
- McRaes Park
- Gifford Park

== Demographics ==
In the 2021 Census, there were 12,592 people in Penshurst. The most common ancestries were Chinese 24.5%, English 16.0%, Australian 14.4%, Nepalese 9.4% and Irish 5.8%. 47.7% of people were born in Australia. The next most common countries of birth were China 13.0%, Nepal 8.7%, Philippines 2.6%, Hong Kong 2.4% and New Zealand 1.5%. 42.5% of people spoke only English at home. Other languages spoken at home included Mandarin 11.8%, Nepali 8.9%, Cantonese 8.6%, Greek 3.5% and Arabic 2.7%. The most common responses for religious affiliation were No Religion 29.2%, Catholic 21.4%, Hinduism 9.7%, Eastern Orthodox 6.9% and Anglican 6.8%.

== Notable residents ==
- Ruby Olive Boye-Jones (1891–1990), coastwatcher
- Sue Denison, received the Medal of the Order of Australia for services to nursing as a nurse practitioner, and services to the Nundle district
- Colin Fraser, rugby league player
- John Patrick Hamilton, Victoria Cross recipient
- Jack Holland, rugby league player
- Jock Marshall (1911–1967), professor of zoology
- Jack McCormack, rugby league player
- Arthur McGuinness (1878–1970), school teacher and union leader
- Chris Minns (born 1979), 47th Premier of New South Wales grew up in Penshurst
