= Oyster reef restoration =

Process of rebuilding or restoring of oyster reefs

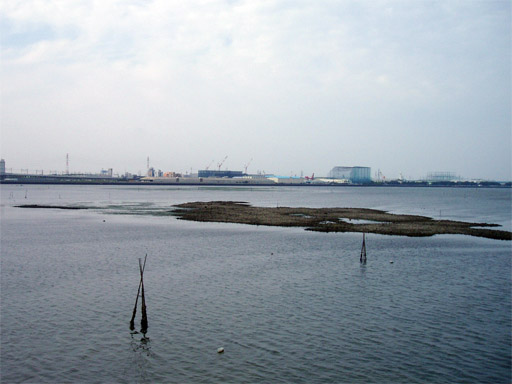
Oyster Reef

Oyster reef restoration refers to the reparation and reconstruction of degraded oyster reefs. Environmental changes, modern fishing practices, over harvesting, water pollution, and other factors, have resulted in damage, disease, and ultimately, a large decline in global population and prevalence of oyster habitats. Aside from ecological importance, oyster farming is an important industry in many regions around the world. Both natural and artificial materials have been used in efforts to increase population and regenerate reefs.

== Ecosystem ==
The first stage in an oyster's life cycle is the free-swimming larval stage. After about three weeks, the larva attaches to a hard substrate—surface area to attach to—such as prop roots, dock pilings, natural rock, and other oysters becoming an oyster spat—oysters that have just settled to the bottom. A large number of oysters often join together, thus forming an oyster reef (also referred to as oyster bed, oyster mat). Once attached to a surface, oysters will stay there for the remainder of their lives. Oysters are classified to be a part of the Ostreacea family, in the bivalve class and part of the phylum Mollusca. Oysters are shellfish that are born individually but grow up to build reefs. Oysters are born drifting on tides and are free swimming with a vertical mobility, however their locomotion quickly changes when oyster reefs secrete a smell. Baby oysters swim above oyster beds and smell a chemical that is emitted throughout tides and is considered a signal for the oysters to get fixed in one place; sessile. Oyster reefs are formed when individual oysters overlap one another and attached itself to their own kind.

Oyster beds provide a number of ecological, economical and recreational benefits to the environment. Oyster beds provide numerous benefits to the ocean life, like supplying habitats for other marine species. Foraged fish, shrimps, crabs, invertebrates and over 300 species live predominantly within oyster beds. Not only do oyster reefs provide a safe nursery to valuable species but they also improved the oceans water quality substantially through a process called filter feeding. Oyster reefs collect their food source by intaking water through their gills and collecting the nutrients and contaminants from the ocean water, while pumping out the cleaned water from their gills back into the ocean. Oyster reefs have the ability to filter out 50 gallons of water per day. The process of filter feeding helps restore the oceans overall health, while also collecting debris for other species to fuel on. Additionally oyster beds provide cohabitation for mussels, barnacles, sea anemones and more. It has become a huge concern that the population of oyster reefs have been decreasing at a rapid rate. Many species are losing their habitat, animals are undergoing a decrease in food consumption and the ocean is experiencing less filtration.

== Background ==
=== Global ===
Oyster reefs, vital coastal ecosystems, have suffered a dramatic decline worldwide. Centuries of unsustainable exploitation, including intense over-harvesting and destructive fishing practices, coupled with increasing pollution, and disease have severely degraded these habitats. By 2011, it was estimated that approximately 85% of global oyster reefs had been lost, highlighting the scale of this ecological crisis. This decline is documented across diverse regions, encompassing Australia, the United States, Europe, and Asia, including China and Japan, as well as coastal Africa. Few healthy oyster reefs remain on the coast of South America, at around 50% of their initial abundance. Overall, oyster reefs are one of the most threatened habitats on Earth, despite being crucial marine structure.

=== Australia ===
In the state of South Australia, oyster reefs mostly created by the Australian flat oyster (Ostrea angasi, or Southern mud oyster) once spread along 1,500 kilometres (930 mi) of coastline, but by the 21st century, there were none left. Since the British colonisation of South Australia from 1836, the waters have been subject to overfishing (and in particular dredging the sea floor, which destroys the oyster beds), water pollution and disease. In addition to temperate reefs in southern Australia, significant efforts are also underway to restore tropical shellfish reefs in Queensland, where extensive reef systems built by species such as Saccostrea glomerata (Sydney rock oyster) and Isognomon ephippium (leaf oyster) once dominated intertidal zones along estuaries and mangrove-lined creeks. Much of this habitat was lost due to historical overharvesting, sedimentation, and coastal development. Community-led restoration programs, such as those coordinated by OzFish Unlimited, have pioneered tropical reef restoration techniques using recycled oyster shells and biodegradable or stainless steel reef units. Projects have been implemented in regions like Moreton Bay, the Burnett River, and Great Keppel Island, helping to rebuild habitat, improve water quality, and support marine biodiversity.

=== United States ===
On the Atlantic coast of the United States, the eastern oyster (also known as Atlantic oyster and American oyster) acts as a keystone species by filtering estuaries and maintaining healthy coastal ecosystems. In addition to being a keystone species, oysters also serve as an indicator species—they are used to gather information on the overall health of the ecosystem.

Since the early Americas, oyster beds have been beneficial for the North American Indians, who harvested oysters for subsistence purposes, and for the European colonists in the region. Since the 19th century oyster beds have been vital for commercial harvests and have generated substantial income. However, the majority of oyster populations have greatly declined within the last century due to over-harvesting, dredging, increased sedimentation, invasive species, pollution and disease. It is estimated that more than 85% of oyster reefs are gone, making it the most threatened marine habitat in the world.

As a result, this has spawned a need for oyster restoration projects in order to revitalize the depleted natural resource of the oyster population.

=== Europe ===
The native oyster species, the European flat oyster Ostrea edulis, historically ranged from the Norwegian Sea near North Ireland and the UK to Mediterranean Sea. Oysters were found in subtidal coastal waters and in the offshore deeper waters of the North Sea and Eastern Channel until the 19th century. Currently, the species is considered functionally extinct in the German and Belgian North Sea. Wild populations remain in along the western coast of Sweden and southern coast of Norway. One of the current challenges limited to Europe in restoring oyster reef is the presence of the invasive parasite Bonamia ostreae. Historically, the rapid decline in oyster reefs was the result of overfishing and exploitation of efficient fishery practices for centuries which eventually led to oyster fishing as an inviable and unprofitable source of economic value. Overall, the production of oysters in Europe has reduced by 60%.

=== China and Japan ===
China, a region of high oyster diversity with 15-23 native species and a millennium of oyster cultivation, has experienced a dramatic decline in its coastal shallow sea of oyster reefs over the past three decades. Reefs in the Bohai Bay including the Hangu oyster reef experiencing a 70% loss due to algal farming rapidly expanding in the area, taking over and smothering the benthic populations. Similarly the Daijawa oyster reef in Laizhou Bay experiencing a 90% loss. Several factors have contributed to the overall oyster reef decline in China, including overfishing for the use of food and lime, habitat loss as city expansion increases, pollution from chemical industries, and hydrologic alterations reducing reproductive success.

Japan has a long history of oyster farming. Its history began when a Japanese fisherman found that oysters would attach to the rocks and bamboo branches of shallow waters. Japan is home to 13-30 species of oysters, including the commercially important Crassostrea gigas. However, in the recent years, Japan has faced an oyster reef decline, with mass oyster die-offs in once highly productive farms. The Momotori district of the Toshikima Island in Toba, Mie Prefecture, a usually major farming area, has faced a major decline in oyster success in the recent seasons. Die off's of 60-90% have been recorded due to higher summer sea temperatures. Fluctuating population numbers of the Crassostrea gigas has been recorded in the Seto Inland Sea of Western Japan. Environmental stressors such as low salinity, food availability, and pCO2 have all been linked to negatively impact oyster numbers in the Seto Inland Sea.

=== Africa ===
Oyster reef ecosystems in Africa face significant degradation and multiple threats despite their ecological and economic importance. These threats have les to a substantial decline in oyster populations and their critical habitats they provide. A key factor in the degradation of oyster habitats in Africa is from the destruction of mangrove forest. Mangroves are vital for the health of oyster populations, as they provide shelter and breeding grounds for various marine species, including oysters. The loss of mangroves due to logging and over-harvesting directly affects inshore and offshore fisheries by reducing the food availability and eliminating crucial shelter and breeding areas, essential for oyster reef health. In Kenya, this destruction has led to significant economic losses, estimated at KES 582 million annually for inshore fisheries within the mangroves. Coupled with the increasing human population along the African coastlines causing even more overexploitation of the mangrove forests. Assessing the full extent of oyster reef loss in Africa is challenging due to a lack of comprehensive historical data. For several regions in Africa, including parts of South Africa, there is limited information on the past abundance and current condition of oyster reefs. This lack of data likely underestimates the severity of the losses and hinders effective conservation efforts information.

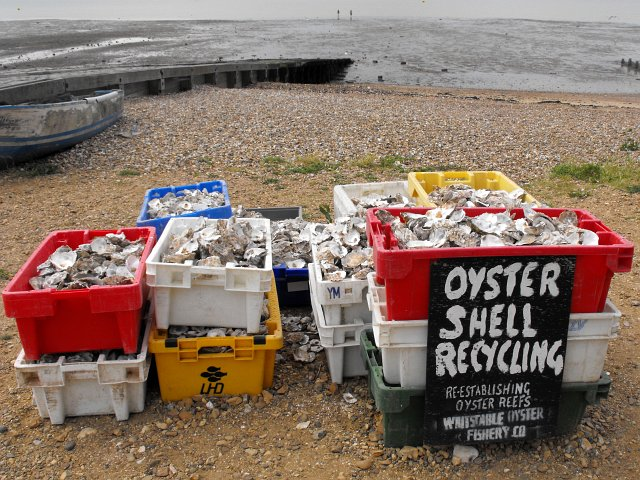
Oyster shell recycling

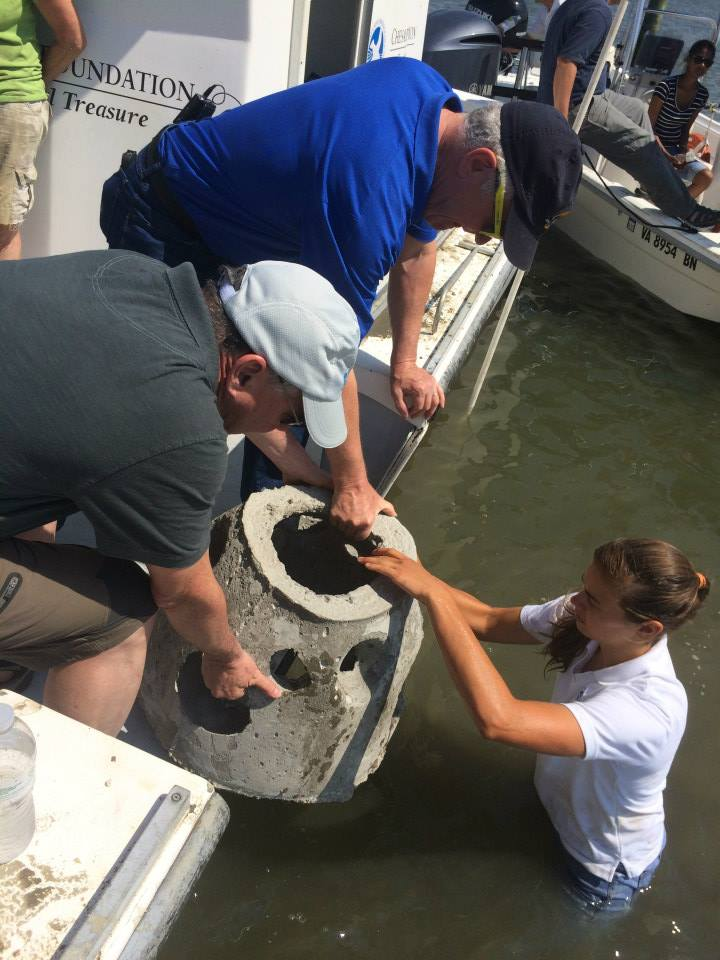
A reef ball composed of substrates such as concrete and recycled shells being placed into the Lafayette River during an Oyster Reef Restoration Project

== Techniques ==
The first step in oyster restoration is to determine the locations for potential reefs. Expanding not only the population of oyster reefs but also the locality of them will help secure the extant of this species. Determining the location for potential reefs is often done by comprehensive surveys that measure multiple variables. The comprehensive survey consists of measuring salinity levels, water quality, previous existence of oyster reefs, substrate conditions, prevalence of diseases, tidal range, oxygen concentration, algae concentration, prevalence of predators, accessibility and security. Once the location is determined for new oyster reefs to form cultch—fossilized shell, coral or other similar materials produced by living organisms designed to provide points of attachment for oysters—is often obtained from sustainable recycling programs. Used oyster shells and clam shells are collected from farmers and restaurants and get disinfected by volunteers to then be used in oyster restoration. Once the used clam and oyster shells are returned to the water, these recycled shells provide substrate for oyster larval eggs to begin populating oyster beds that were laid out by volunteers. Cultching has been the most successful approach when it comes to oyster beds getting reformed, and was pioneered for oyster farming in the early 19th century. Cultching consists of collecting materials that would be suitable for spat to attach too, and would be considered as a "natural oyster reef." Cultch is processed and distributed in locations that LDWF consider acceptable for having a satisfactory outcome.

There are many other ways oyster reefs can get reformed. The Office of Habitat Conservations NOAA Restoration Center is a restoration program that has funded more than 70 oyster restoration projects within 15 states. The NOAA Restoration team has conducted various methods to restore oyster beds. One way the NOAA team has restored the oyster beds is by distributing large quantities of shells in the ocean as a strong foundation for other oysters to attach themselves. Additionally the NOAA has re-enhanced shoreline stability by building a linear reef to provide protection for not only other marine life but the oyster beds as well. Another way oyster reefs can be reformed is by investing in more hatchery facilities. By increasing hatchery facilities for oysters volunteers and scientists would have the ability to artificially control and breed viable oyster eggs. Unfortunately in the ocean when eggs are released onto the oyster beds not all of the eggs make it to full term, thus making the population of oyster mats at a risk for extinction. The hatchery facilities would guarantee for oyster eggs to be bred appropriately and until they are capable of surviving on their own.

== Goals ==
The typical desired outcomes of these restoration projects are the restoration of oyster reefs to produce a fully functioning, three-dimensional bed system that provides associated ecosystem services and biological functions, such as marine biodiversity, shoreline protection, sediment trapping, water quality improvement, and recreational fishing opportunities. Oyster reefs are known as the "ecosystem engineers" and it is important that they remain the crucial filter feeders they are. By addressing the issues that oyster reefs are facing the life in water would improve ecosystem services. While having healthy and a vast population of oyster reefs is beneficial to the life in water it is also pivotal to have these oyster species living and healthy, because without them the food chain and ecosystem would undergo a drastic impact. These impacts can consist of animals losing their home and having to go through adaptation, animals lacking food source, water quality deteriorating, climate change will heighten and erosion of salt marshes would increase. The overall goal is to ameliorate the oyster reefs health to boost marine agriculture production, provide storm preventions, provide marine life habitation and most importantly improve water quality throughout oceans.

The National Oceanic and Atmospheric Administration (NOAA) provides some of the major goals of an oyster restoration project:

- Augment commercial harvest
- Serve as habitat
- Improve water quality
- Increase or improve spat set in an area by creating oyster sanctuaries
- Maintain or increase biodiversity
- Restore ecological function
- Provide a barrier to prevent beach or shoreline erosion
- Protect and enhance sea grass restoration projects

== Environmental value ==
Oyster reef restoration can recover oyster densities to match those of healthy natural reefs. Oysters act as a foundation species by creating habitat and enhancing multiple ecosystem functions. They filter the water and increase water clarity by extracting organic and inorganic particles. The filtration capacity of an average adult oyster is estimated to be 50 gallons per day. Oysters not only clean the water, but also act as effective shoreline buffers by dissipating the energy caused by boat wakes and waves. Oyster reefs also support critical fisheries by providing habitat for numerous species of fish, crustaceans and shellfish.

The ecological value of reusing oyster shells for oyster restoration projects is vital not only for producing zero waste, but also for diversifying and increasing the number of oyster beds in a given area. In addition to environmental benefits, oyster restoration is also economically beneficial since coastal communities rely heavily on oysters for profit and subsistence.

=== Environmental preventative issues ===
Some ancient reefs are used to make restorative oyster reefs in nearby sites. However, to reduce the risk of environmental damage when dredging, many projects tend to stay away from this method of transplanting. Another issue of environmental harm is placing invasive or newly introduced oyster species in an unknown habitat that can cause more harm than good. Therefore, it is important to correctly place oyster species in their respective habitats to prevent environmental harm to nearby oyster reefs. More information is available in local extension agencies within the state you live in.

== Economic value ==
Oyster reefs provide essential habitats for many ecological and economically important fish as well as invertebrate species. Healthy oyster populations improve the quality of water, which in turn improves commercial and recreational fishing, recreational boating, and ecotourism. Not only does oyster restoration create additional jobs through the duration of projects, but it also safeguards many other jobs ranging from marine construction to scientific research jobs. Dr. Paul Zimba, Director of the Center for Coastal Studies at Texas A&M-Corpus Christi said, "Oysters are an important ecological and economic resource. They create habitats for fish and shellfish, filter and clean bay waters, protect shorelines from erosion, and are a valued commercial fishery element."

=== Aquaculture ===
The research in aquaculture has been a major contributor to the development of viable oyster strains to assist the commercial aquaculture industry and local ecosystems. The industry of aquaculture is booming with global profits exceeding $3,000,000,000 annually. Oyster restoration projects assist in the production of aquaculture harvests and have different procedural measures for different areas of the United States.

Aquaculture techniques vary geographically and represent regional differences. Some areas of the U.S. have enacted policies to lease out areas for aquaculture businesses to utilize the oyster-restored beds. These leasing policies will prove beneficial to job creation in coastal areas, improve the surrounding economy, and restore habitats where oyster restoration projects and commercial businesses occur.

All in all, aquaculture has and will continue to gain recognition for providing sustainable harvesting methods.

== Social value ==
Oyster restoration has many recreational benefits. Improved water clarity and overall cleaner water greatly increases recreational fishing, boating and swimming. This allows locals and tourists to appreciate the environment around them.

In many parts of the southeastern United States volunteer efforts are responsible for oyster restoration. Community-based oyster restoration programs allow people to become knowledgeable on the important benefits oysters provide to an ecosystem. This volunteerism connects individuals with their environment as well as ensures the existence of oyster populations for future generations to appreciate. Areas of the southeastern United States, such as the coastal areas in the Gulf of Mexico, have a rich tradition related to oysters and other marine food that coastal areas provide. Oysters are part of the social culture in these areas and oyster restoration is a step towards preserving their traditions.

In addition to volunteering with oyster restoration projects, individuals with shoreline property—or those who have access to it—have the option of backyard shellfish gardening. This sustainable form of oyster harvesting allows for personal consumption or environmental enhancement and usually does not require special licenses or permits.

== Examples by country ==
=== Australia ===
As of 2021, shellfish reef restoration is being undertaken by The Nature Conservancy at various locations in the coastal waters of the states of Western Australia, Victoria, South Australia (SA) and Queensland.

A large oyster reef has been constructed off the Yorke Peninsula, SA, near Ardrossan, known as Windara Reef. This is as of 2021 Australia's largest reef restoration project, and the largest outside of the United States. Stage 1 of the project was completed in June 2017, with work on Stage 2, involving the addition of 11,000 square metres (120,000 sq ft) reef over 16 hectares (40 acres), completed in September 2018. More than 7 million juvenile Australian flat oysters were placed on the reef's foundation.

Another project was begun in late 2020 in deep water off the beach at the Adelaide suburb of Glenelg, SA. here, the Australian flat oysters create reefs rising directly from the sea floor, rather than rising vertically in the intertidal zone, as do species like the Sydney rock oyster (Saccostrea glomerata). For this reason, hundreds of tonnes of stone had to be spread across the sea floor to create a foundation for the reef at Glenelg.

=== United States ===
In response to the decline in population, many oyster restoration projects have been put into place throughout the southeastern United States. The projects develop a long-term strategy of sustained productivity for oyster reefs and restore the ecological role they provide to nearby reef habitats.

Oyster reef restoration projects have been implemented in Southwest Florida, North Carolina, South Carolina, Georgia Southern California, and Alabama. A common species of oysters used in oyster restoration is the Eastern American oyster (Crassostrea virginica), which is also called the American Oyster, Atlantic Oyster, Common Oyster, and Virginia Oyster.

According to the Southern Regional Aquaculture Center (SRAC), oysters in the southern part of the United States spawn when water temperatures are above 68 degrees. But they are affected more by the specific site where oyster restoration projects occur, the species of oysters used in a project, and if they are native to the surrounding area and disease free.

Commonly in the southeastern U.S., mangroves and other shoreline vegetation are often planted in conjunction with oyster restoration efforts to provide substrate – surface area to attach to – and reduce shoreline erosion resulting in less sediment deposits within estuaries.

Oyster restoration in public waters often requires permits and licenses from various agencies with requirements varying from state to state. Most often permits typically involve the U.S. Army Corps of Engineers, state natural resource agencies and state public health departments.

==== Florida ====
The Oyster Reef Restoration began in June 2009 and was completed by fall of 2010. The project was funded by the NOAA as part of the American Recovery and Reinvestment Act of 2009. The goal of the project was to restore the important oyster habitat in St. Lucie and Loxahatchee Estuaries, two of the largest brackish water systems on the east coast of Florida, where over the last 50 years the oyster populations has declined by 75%.

According to a 2015 report, oyster reefs have been the most damaged biotic community for the past 50 years. Florida is known to have one of the most declining oyster reef population due to the Big Bend area being an undeveloped coastline. The Big Bend area is a coastal region that is east of Apalachicola (city in Florida) and north of Tampa. The Big Bend Area has an abnormal estuarine salinity level due to a reduction of freshwater discharge. Due to the poor water quality of the Big Bend Area the survival rate of oyster bars surviving is slim and the impacts of the water quality have made oyster reefs chip and fracture. The decay of the oyster reefs have been inhibiting stabilization and causing eroding of the sand bar. The process to recover these oyster reefs in Florida have been costly and the survival rate of spat (newborn oysters) is low. The poor water quality has not only impacted the viability of oyster reefs but also effected the coastwise movement within Florida's Big Bend region.

The Pilot Project in Florida conducted a restoration project that consisted of testing two conservation techniques. The first part of the project consisted of testing out two materials that can be used for cultching which were lime rock boulders and cultch-filled agriculture bags. The second part of the project was analyzing whether or not these two materials were durable enough to sustain or improve the oyster reef population in the Big Bend area. The Pilot Project study included four restoration sites and four control sites. The restoration area chosen had 20 – 40 cm covered with lime rock boulders that were 10 – 20 cm in diameter. The lime rock boulder was lined with 1.4 m squared clam bags that was collected from local agriculture organization in Cedar Keys Florida. The four restoration sites took 19 months to get fully covered with the durable materials. The Pilot Project analyzed the four restoration sites through the usage of time lapse trail cameras and evaluated the oysters size and density. The Pilot Project resulted in a $80,235 experiment to rebuild the oyster reef in the Big Bend area of Florida. The restoration project increased the oyster reefs in Florida by covering 16 cm more of the ocean floor, while also decreasing the salinity level. The restoration project not only helped revive the oyster reef population but has also impacted other trophic levels. The restoration project was found to be successful when certain aquatic birds were found on the sites that was not present before due to the poor water quality.

The Pilot Project in Florida also played a role as a shoreline armor because one of the many ecosystem benefits oyster reefs provide is reduction of storm surge and wave impacts. An article that was published by the University of Florida in 2022 showed that oyster reefs provide citizens with shoreline protection. The decline of oyster reefs have proven to have a correlation with an increase in shoreline erosion caused by storms and boat wakes. The article shows that with the increase of oyster reefs there is a continuous decrease in the amount of shoreline erosions within Florida. Oyster reef beds have not only provided benefits to aquatic wildlife but also urban ecology because coastal residents in Florida have agreed that oyster reefs prevent property damage to their homes, loss of land, and damage done by waves. The cost to repair the oyster reefs for Florida would be $85,988 annually if they rebuild oyster reefs with wire baskets, plastic mesh or rock and shells. According to the article the restoration of these oyster beds would protect 76.5% of coastal residents homeland property.

==== New York City ====
As of September 2016, the Environmental Protection Department of New York City has added nearly 50,000 adult oysters to Jamaica Bay, Long Island. The funding comes from a grant of US$1 million given by the United States Interior Department's Hurricane Sandy Coastal Resiliency Competitive Grant Program. By inducing a self-sustaining oyster population into Jamaica Bay, potential benefits include: "improving water quality, protecting the shoreline from erosion and reviving habitats for fish and wildlife".

Pete Malinowski, co-founder and director of the Billion Oyster Project, says, "It used to be known for its oysters. At one time, half of the world's oysters were harvested in the New York Harbor." The goal of a billion oysters seems ambitious, but pales to the number of oysters that populated the waters in colonial times: 3 trillion oysters, and 300,000,000,000,000,000,000 annual spawn of oyster larvae. In September 2016, 85 cages with five gallons of oysters each were tied to a 400 pound anchor and pulled into the harbor to be dropped. For 2 years the department will assess the surrounding water quality and monitor oyster beds.

According to a 2020 report published by the Hudson River Estuary Program, the water quality of the Hudson River has improved since 1972. The Community Water Quality Testing (CWQT) program publishes weekly reports by community scientists partnered with the Billion Oyster Project and collaborating labs throughout the city. The data collected has shown the steady decrease in the most probable number of Enterococcus colonies, listing that the waters are considered "acceptable" for swimming according to the NYC Department of Health's Enterococcus standards for swimming. The concentration of PCBs in aquatic wildlife has also decreasing, but continue to prevent consumption of fishes from the river. Contaminants such as cadmium and dioxin have leveled in concentration after being significantly reduced. DDT has also been reported to longer be a notable issue. Some of the challenges the urban oyster beds in the Hudson River face include deficient bottom substrate due to past sediment removal and dredging in the harbor estuary, toxic contaminants, combined sewage overflow (CSO), and diseases. The sewage, excess nitrogen, PCBs, and other pollutants make the oyster reefs more susceptible to disease and are the reason oysters and aquatic fishes from the estuary are banned from being consumed.

The Billion Oyster Project and New York Harbor School have worked with restaurants in Manhattan to fill steel gabion structures called "reef balls" with recycled oyster shells. These structures provide better habitats for estuarine fish and oyster larvae compared to previous attempts of deploying loose clam shells in 1999 due to fast and strong currents causing shell burial and loss. The structures must be secured with cages or bags which raises cost of restoration. Additionally, the oysters in the NY/NJ Harbor primarily live in subtidal environments which limits restoration sites and makes the reefs more susceptible to predators.

Along Staten Island's southern shore, the project Living Breakwaters has been funded by the New York State Governor's Office of Storm Recovery (GOSR) and the U.S. Department of. Housing and Urban Development. The project aims to "reduce coastal risk, create and restore essential marine habitat, and build social resilience through the design and construction of new breakwater structures." The project is a green coastal defense that includes approximately 2,400 feet of breakwaters which are "partially submerged rubble mound structures located between 790 and 1,800 feet from shore." The Billion Oyster Project aims to seed oysters by supply breeding oysters to build viable oyster reefs within the breakwater system. The Billion Oyster Project will utilize placing spat on reef streets and some of the enhanced concrete units which make up the external layer of the rubble mound structures and installing oyster gabions. Based on computer and physical modeling, the system of breakwaters are "designed to reduce waves reaching on-shore buildings and roads to below 3 feet in height in the event of a 100-year storm assuming up to 18 inches of sea level rise." Through hydrodynamic modeling, the project has shown that the breakwaters will increase coastal resiliency even if the structures are completely submerged due to sea level rise. The restoration of the oyster reefs will further facilitate coastal resiliency by reducing shoreline erosion and absorbing the force of waves before they hit the shoreline. The construction of the breakwaters began in 2021 and is slated to be completed in 2024. The oysters will be installed between 2023 and 2025 in the Raritan Bay.

The Nature Conservancy lists the biggest challenge to oyster restoration in the NY/NJ Harbor to be regulations and the perception of the oysters being an "attractive nuisance" meaning that the public will try to harvest oysters in contaminated waters. Restoration is also more difficult in New Jersey waters of the shared harbor due to the perceived risk of consumption of contaminated oysters. Over 50,000 oysters were destroyed in Keyport Harbor due to such strict regulations in 2010. Due to such restrictions, most restoration activities helmed by the NY/NJ Baykeeper are located at the Naval Weapons Station Earle, which is closed to the public.

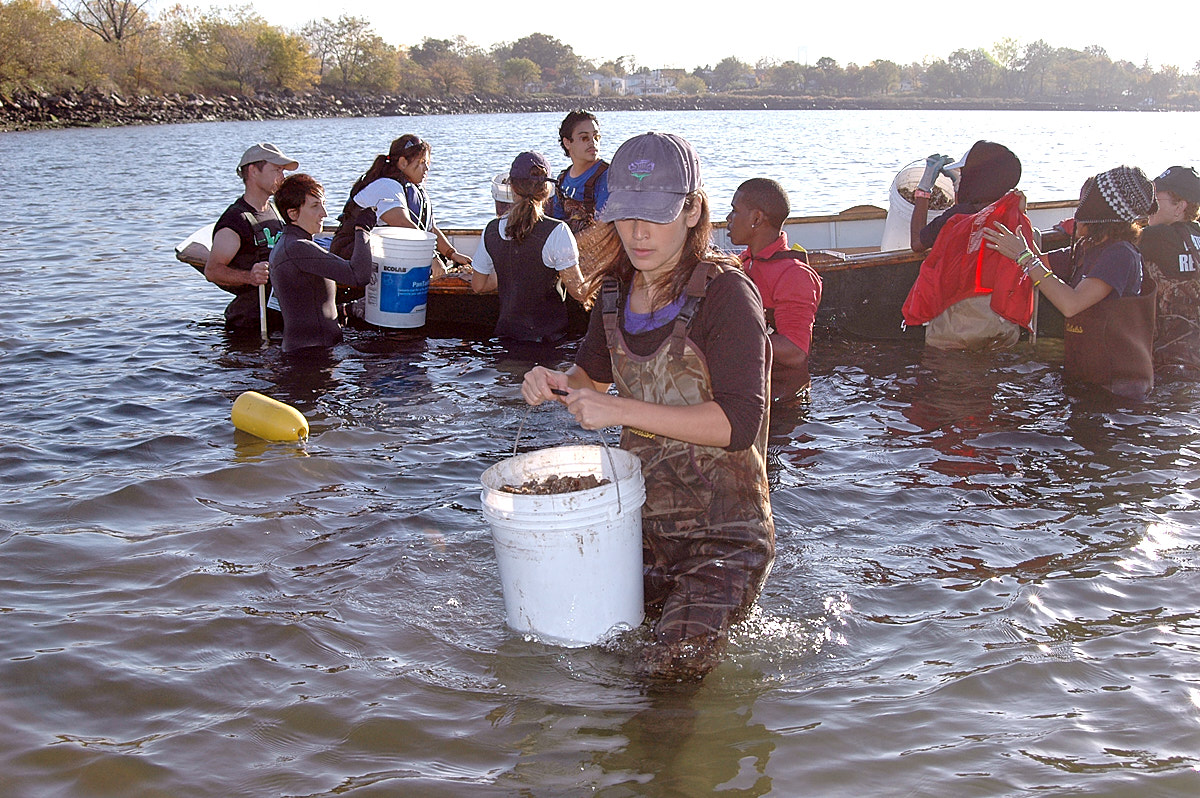
Experimental oyster reef creation off Soundview Park in the Bronx

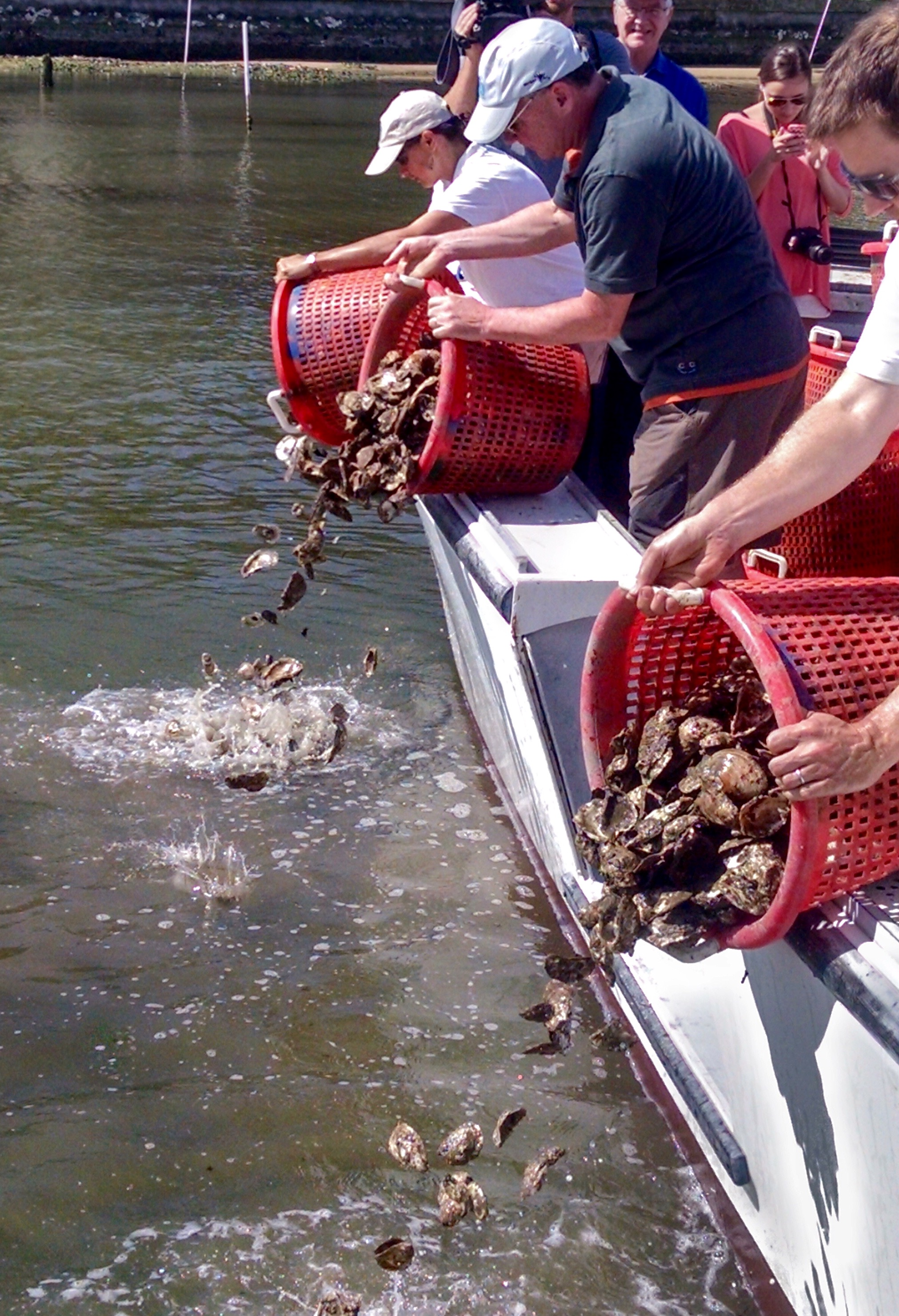
Deployment of oysters in Lafayette River in Norfolk, Virginia

New York City oyster restoration efforts have been successful with the rapid growth and stable survival of the reefs. In the 2019 Oyster Monitoring Report published by the Billion Oyster Project, oysters were able to grow and form reefs at all reef sites. The oysters also experienced periodic hypoxia and older oysters were largely infected by Dermo (Perkinsus marinus). Over 250 thousand adult oysters have been planted by the project and 100 million oysters have been restored since 2014. Oyster recruitment was particularly favorable in 2018 with the sighting of naturally occurring oyster spat in Piers 25, 40, near Jamaica Bay, and Soundview. The Nature Conservancy makes the argument for continued investment in these projects as current oyster growth and survival rates are inadequate to maintain a self-sustaining population.

==== North Carolina ====
The Eastern Oyster populations of the Tar-Pamlico and Neuse River basins have plunged 97% to 3% of historic numbers throughout the last century. In response to this drastic change, the Citizens' Oyster Gardening Project (COGP) began. COGP is an environmental demonstration project that encourages oyster gardening aimed to reestablish populations of native Eastern Oysters in North Carolina through education and aquaculture methods. Educational workshops teach volunteers how to measure water quality and give information on oyster gardening techniques as well as necessary tools and materials. Advocacy through networking by volunteers is key to COGP's success.

==== South Carolina ====
South Carolina Oyster Restoration and Enhancement (SCORE) is another volunteer oyster restoration movement. SCORE operates under the direction of the South Carolina Department of Natural Resources (SCDNR) and began in May 2001. The sites span approximately 200 miles (320 km) of the South Carolina coastline and have constructed 188 oyster reefs at 35 sites since the program began.

==== Virginia ====
In Virginia, a large restoration project is being done in the Elizabeth River and its waterways. This river has several smaller branches flowing out of it including the Southern, Eastern, and Western branches along with the Lafayette River. These all end up in the Chesapeake Bay. Oyster levels in the bay have fallen to >1% of their historic population. The Elizabeth River was heavily polluted due to the wood treatment plant waste, city sewage, pesticides in stormwater runoff, and heavy metals draining into the river.

In 2011, the Elizabeth River Project and the Chesapeake Bay Foundation joined forces to begin 'The Lafayette River Restoration Plan'. The first step towards the restoration of this heavily urbanized river was to clean it to the point where oysters and aquatic life would be viable. After this was accomplished, approximately 1500 reef balls, composed of recycled oyster shells and concrete, were placed into the water. These reef balls are surfaces for oysters to adhere to and build a reef thriving with life. About 470 million shells with oyster larvae (spat) have been dropped into the Lafayette River during the project. These larvae were able to attach to reef balls. These efforts have created 12 new oyster reefs spanning 32 acres. In 2021, oyster density was surveyed and had risen from almost nothing to 156-365 per square inch. With millions of new oysters filtering the water, there has been an uptick in aquatic life such as the return of dolphins, seahorses and crabs as well as the return of the nearly extinct brown pelican. The river is currently deemed safe for recreational activities like swimming. The ultimate goal is to have increased the oyster population in the Chesapeake Bay to 10 billion by 2025.

In order to continue the restoration of the rest of the Elizabeth river waterways and eventually all waterways that lead into the Chesapeake Bay, both the Elizabeth River Project and the Chesapeake Bay Foundation encouraged spreading awareness and education about environmental health. By engaging the community in oyster reef restoration and showing the public the effects this project has on the river, they hope that it would lead to generational protection of the waterways and environments.

=== Germany ===
As a part of the RESTORE Project funded by the German Federal Agency for Nature Conservation (BfN), the Ostrea edulis was reintroduced in the Natura 2000 site Borkum Riffgrund according to the International Union for Conservation of Nature (IUCN) guidelines and the Berlin Oyster Recommendation. Borkum Riffgrund, a protected site due to its location in the North Sea Oyster Ground, is used for large-scale oyster restoration as its deeper waters provide more adequate conditions for restoration. Previous oyster reef restoration sites were located in shallow coastal waters. The RESTORE project's duration is listed as 2016 to 2025.

In the RESTORE preliminary investigation "Voruntersuchung", which lasted from 2016-2019, Ostrea edulis, also known as European flat oysters were introduced along the northern maritime area of island of Helgoland and within the MarGate research site offshore from the island. The health and reproduction fitness studies were conducted and the deployed oysters were reported to have "(1) high fitness, (2) excellent growth and condition, (3) the formation of firmly aggregated oyster clusters, and (4) unexpectedly early reproductive activity within the first year" of the 2017 study. The study's findings were used to assess and confirm that the restoration site is favorable and can support the reintroduction of the species.

The main project started in summer of 2020 with the assembly of a pilot reef composed of 80 tons of limestone and reef substrate made from oyster shells. Approximately 100,000 juvenile oysters (Ostrea edulis) were introduced to the oyster reef. These juvenile oysters were provided by PROCEED, a hatchery located at AWI-Helgoland. The hatchery is also funded by BfN and aims to contribute to the long-term restoration and conservation of the oyster reef by supplying healthy and viable oyster seeds. According to the Native Oyster Restoration Alliance (NORA), the limiting factor in European reef restoration is adequate seed supply. The main goal of oyster reef restoration in Borkum Riffgrund is to establish a pilot oyster reef that can be studied and improve restoration efforts in other suitable locations in the German North Sea Exclusive Economic Zone.

=== England ===
Along the southern coast of England, the Solent is a strait separating the mainland from the Isle of Wight and is home to a large oyster (Ostrea edulis) population that has been historically present. The Solent Oyster Restoration Project (SORP) funded by the Blue Marine Foundation (BLUE) is responsible for the reseeding and restoration of the habitat. The project utilizes a network of oyster nurseries composed of brood stock cages suspended below the water's surface. The brood stock cages are densely populated with mature brood stock oysters that reproduce and release larvae into the Solent. This provides adequate seed supply which is a significant limiting factor in European restoration efforts. The project also employs seabed cages which contain native oysters at different levels above the sea floor to facilitate oyster reef creation and re-establishment of wild populations. Three hectares oyster reefs were created with shell and cultch made of gravel. With the help of the University of Portsmouth, SORP engages in restoration hatchery practices. Local adult oyster populations are reared and reproduce so their offspring can be used to seed the newer reefs. The project also relies on community outreach to increase restoration efforts and education.

In summer 2017, the first generation of brood stock oysters spawned into the Solent. Since the establishment of the first oyster reef in Langstone Harbor in 2021, over 100,000 oysters have been restored and 97 marine species have been found in the nurseries including critically endangered species such as the European eel (Anguilla anguilla). Currently, there are 12 oyster restoration sites. BLUE hopes to expand into restoring and reconnecting oyster reefs with saltmarshes and seagrass ecosystems that were historically present in the Solent.

The Essex Native Oyster Restoration Initiative (ENORI) has been working to restore native oyster populations in the Blackwater, Roach, Crouch and Colne estuaries since 2011. ENORI aims to restore oyster reefs through by providing brood stock oysters and adequate substrate to expand the habitat. The initiative has also created management fisheries in hopes of increasing the breeding population enough to maintain a sustainable fishery.

=== Scotland ===
In 2014, The Dornoch Environmental Enhancement Project (DEEP) project was initiated. The Dornoch Firth was heavily polluted due to waste from the Glenmorangie Distillery. This pollution led to the death of many oysters which caused even further pollution since the water was being filtered less. Oyster numbers also decreased significantly due to overfishing in the 18th and 19th century. The goals of this project were to create a new oyster reef in the Dornoch Firth and to restore native oyster populations to their numbers prior to their early 1900s disappearance from the Dornoch Firth waters. DEEP is a collaborative effort between Glenmorangie Distillery who provides funding, Heriot-Watt University who conducts field research and the Marine Conservation Society who educated the community to spread awareness and support'.

In 2017, the DEEP project by moved approximately 300 oysters from Loch Ryan to place them in the Dornoch Firth and monitor them to determine whether the oysters would survive in the new environment. The oysters were able to successfully reproduce and grow in their new home at Dornoch Firth. Scientists next task was to create an oyster reef to facilitate expansion of this newly placed oyster community. Materials utilized by DEEP researchers included empty scallop and mussel shells. Sizes and shell types were experimented with to determine the best substrate for a reef.

The 300 oysters placed into the Dornoch Firth have since built a reef around the shell cultch that reached 20,000 oysters in 2021. Scientists plan on initiating additional restoration projects in Plockton, Ardfern and Loch Ryan.

=== France ===
France's oyster population has been reduced significantly due to overfishing, parasites, and an increased number of predators. These threats to the flat oyster species (Ostrea edulis) have landed them a spot on the critically endangered species list by the European Union.

The Flat Oyster Restoration Project (FOREVER), based in Brittany, began in 2018. FOREVER has been working to re-establish native oyster populations by studying oyster reefs in the Bays of Brest and Quiberon to understand how to improve their restoration efforts. Each restorative effort is specific to the individual environment. Factors such as pathology, genetics, and diseases can be different across various areas, therefore, FOREVER customizes each conservation and restoration plan after studying these variables. After conducting this extensive research, scientists working on this project placed substrates in the Beys of Brest. One of three methods to introduce new oysters into the environment is chosen. These three methods include the introduction of larvae, spat or adult oysters into the water to promote development of underwater oyster communities.

=== Netherlands ===
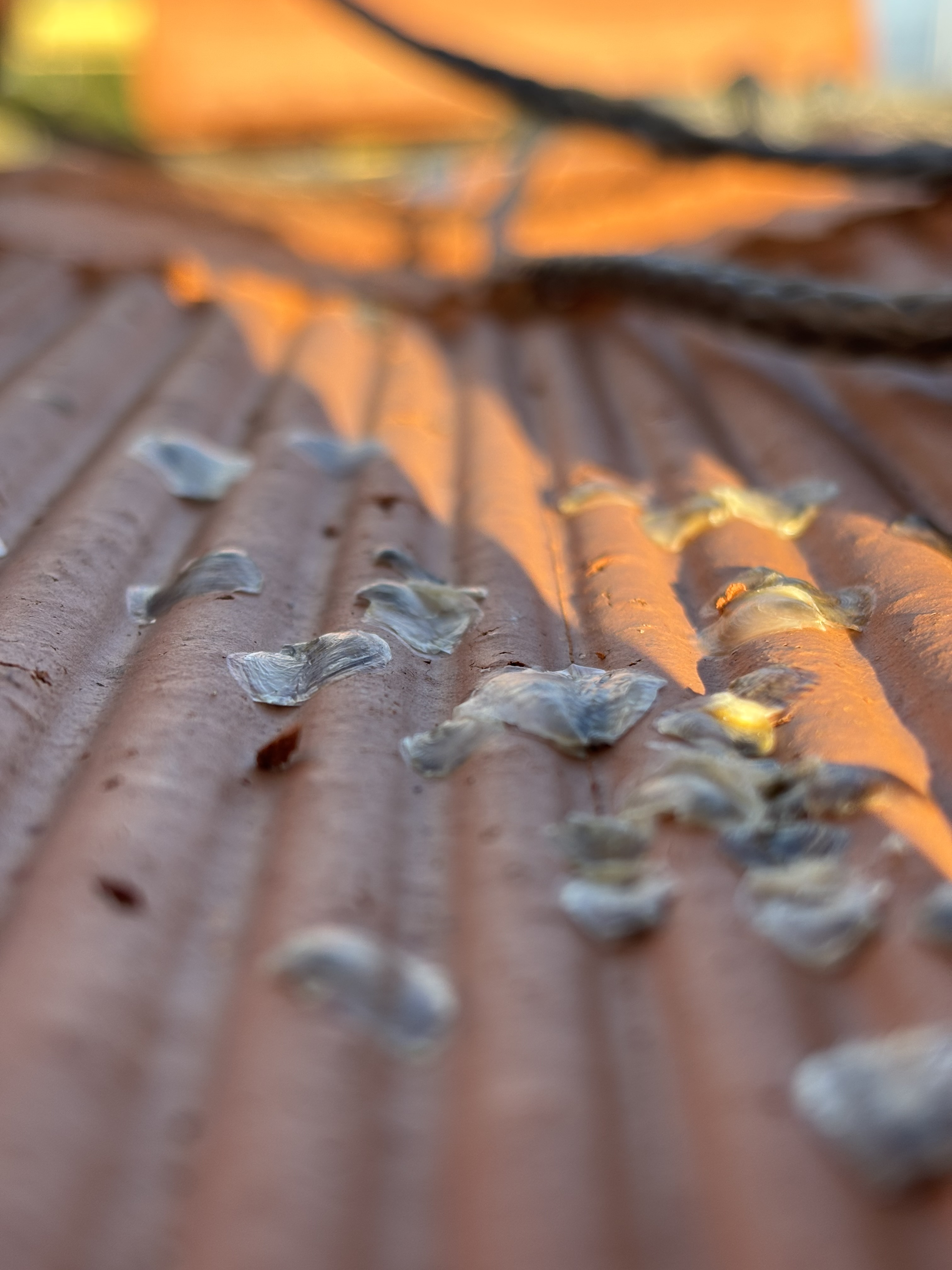
Native oyster spats settle on these clay substrates in mobile nurseries. Once deployed in the sea, these hard substrates protect young oysters, and their increased surface area provides shelter and nursery grounds for other marine species.

A flat oyster (Ostrea edulis) restoration project has been underway since 2025 in the Veerse Meer, a brackish lagoon in the province of Zeeland. The project, known as Project Asta, is carried out by Oyster Heaven in collaboration with industry, government, and research partners. Restoration involves installing clay substrates, known as "Mother Reefs," pre-seeded with juvenile oysters, to provide a stable base for reef formation and habitat for other marine species. In 2025, around four million juvenile oysters were installed on these structures. According to Oyster Heaven, an estimated 9 million epifaunal organisms were inhabiting the developing reef by mid-season. The project is intended to develop into a self-sustaining reef within approximately ten years, with progress tracked through diver video surveys, photogrammetry, and eDNA sampling.

A similar project using the same clay reef substrate. Project Luna, is under development off the Norfolk coast in England, with a planned deployment of around four million oysters by the end of 2027.

=== China and Japan ===
In Laizhou Bay, China, targeted restoration efforts have been implemented to support the native oyster species, Crassostrea ariakensis. Notably, in 2006, the region was designated as a Marine Protected Area (MPA) with the dual objectives of safeguarding indigenous oyster populations and conserving Tamarix species. A key component of the MPA's management strategy involved the removal of cultured Pacific oysters from adjacent waters to mitigate interspecific competition with C. ariakensis. While this intervention has demonstrably contributed to population recovery, persistent challenges remain, including unauthorized harvesting and poaching, which continue to impede full restoration success.

In Hong Kong, a collaborative approach to oyster reef restoration is being pursued through partnerships between The Nature Conservancy (TNC) Hong Kong and the University of Hong Kong's Swire Institute of Marine Science (SWIMS). This initiative encompasses four distinct restoration projects across the territory. The inaugural project, initiated in 2018, established an oyster farm in Lau Fau Shan, Deep Bay. Subsequently, a second reef was developed in Tolo Harbour in 2019, with the fourth project near Hong Kong International Airport on northern Lantau Island in 2021. Notably, a distinct restoration methodology was employed on the third reef at Pak Nai in 2020, wherein an abandoned oyster farm was restructured rather than establishing a new reef. This approach yielded significantly higher species diversity, with surveys revealing 61 species compared to 21 in newly established reefs. Based on these findings, TNC aims to expand restoration efforts throughout Hong Kong and beyond. Furthermore, the "Oyster Save Our Seas" (Oyster SOS) collaborative platform has been established, uniting farmers, academics, and non-governmental organizations to enhance public awareness and engagement in oyster reef conservation through educational initiatives, exhibitions, and student-focused projects.

Japan has a long history of oyster aquaculture, and recent scientific efforts are increasingly focused on the restoration and conservation of oyster populations, particularly the commercially important Japanese pearl oyster, Pinctada fucata, and the Pacific oyster, Crassostrea gigas. Initiatives aimed to address declines in oyster populations and to support the broader health of coastal ecosystems have been underway. Japan employs a variety of oyster reef restoration and conservation methods. In southern Japan, one approach involves establishing managed shell "reefs" for cultivating mixed oyster species. These bottom-based cultivation methods, while less common than suspended oyster culture (which offers minimal habitat benefits), present an opportunity to incorporate ecological considerations into aquaculture practices. This approach also allows for the creation of hybrid aquaculture-restoration sites. A significant aspect of Japan's approach involves advanced genetic research. Scientists have constructed a high-quality, chromosome-scale genome of Pinctada fucata to identify genes crucial for survival and immunity. This research seeks to understand how pearl oysters have adapted to environmental changes and to breed more resilient mollusks, combating the impact of viruses and red tides that have severely affected pearl production. Researchers are also analyzing the genetic structure of P. fucata populations across the Western Pacific to inform conservation strategies, especially in light of climate change. In Hokkaido, efforts are being made to promote sustainable aquaculture practices that support oyster populations. This includes utilizing local oyster seedlings to reduce the risks associated with introducing diseases and invasive species from geographically distant populations. In Akkeshi, the use of locally sourced, single-seed oysters, marketed as "Kaki-Emon," is being promoted. Japanese research also addresses the threats facing oyster populations, such as disease and habitat loss. The studies highlight the importance of maintaining genetic diversity within oyster populations to enhance their resilience to environmental changes and pathogens. With the combined efforts Japan is continuing to work on conserving their oyster reef populations.

=== Africa ===
Conservation efforts in Africa are utilizing the impact of community involvement, initiatives in some African regions are actively engaging local communities in mangrove conservation where oyster reef populations reside. These efforts aim to create awareness, educate, and train communities on the sustainable use of mangrove resources, the conservation of threatened species, including the oysters. Community conservation groups are playing a crucial role in mangrove restoration. In Kenya, women, who were previously excluded from mangrove planting and protection, are now leading conservation efforts. This increased participation has significantly boosted the number of tree nurseries and the number of trees planted, leading to improved forest management and the protection of restored areas. Innovative approaches like carbon market initiatives are being implemented to incentivize mangrove conservation. In Kwale County, Kenya, the Mikoko Pamoja community project compensates local communities for conserving mangrove forests, demonstrating a successful model that could be replicated in other regions. To reduce pressure on mangrove forests, coastal communities, in collaboration with organizations like the Kenya Marine Fisheries Research Institute and the Kenya Forest Service, are exploring alternative tree species for wood and fuel needs. While these alternatives cannot fully replace the ecological value of mangroves, they contribute to conservation efforts by decreasing the demand for mangrove resources.
