= Oyster reef =

Mangrove encroachment on oyster reefs

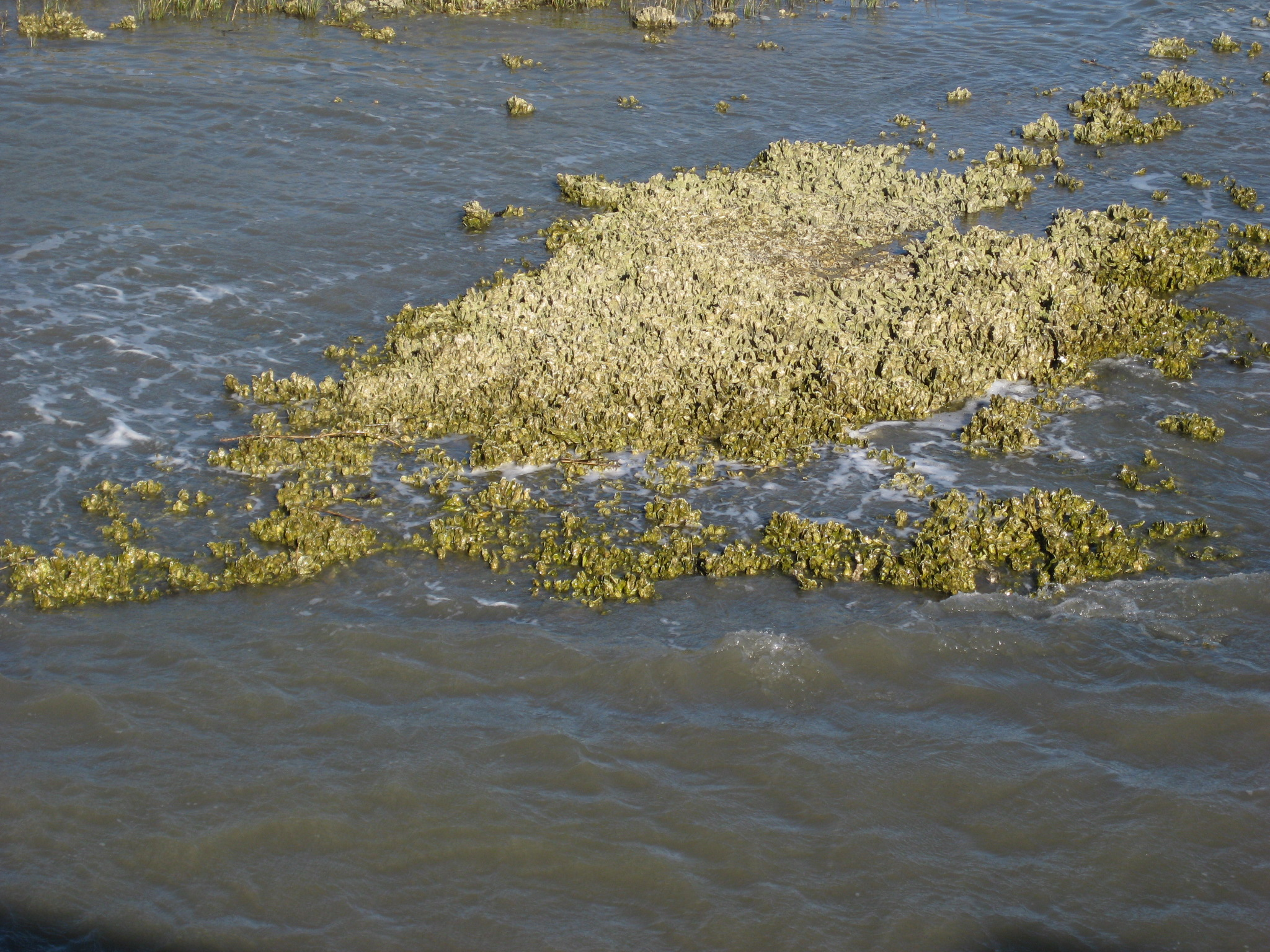
Oyster reef at about mid-tide off fishing pier at Hunting Island State Park, South Carolina

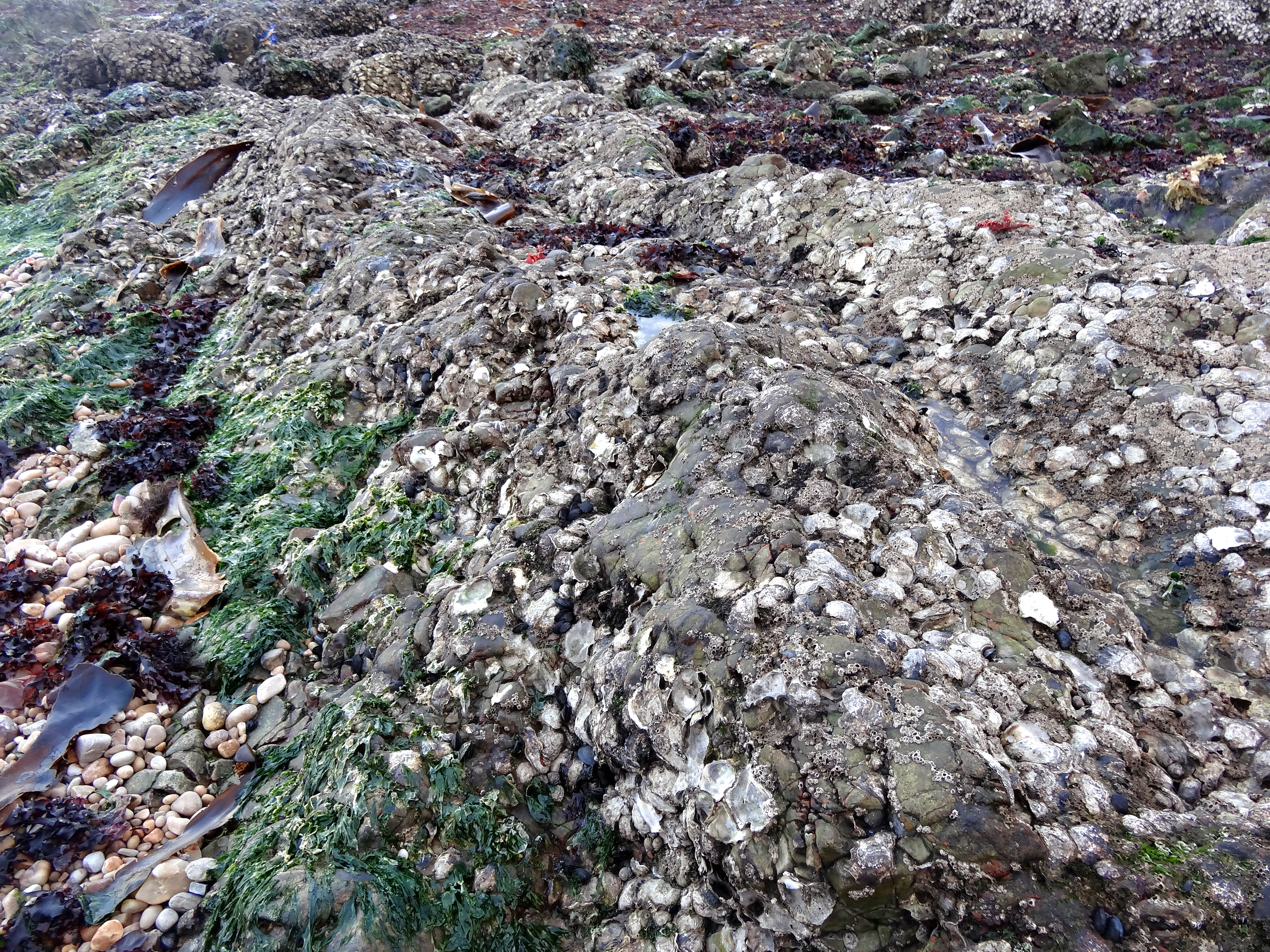
Rocks in intertidal zone covered by oysters, at Bangchuidao Scenic Area, Dalian, Liaoning Province, China

An oyster reef is a dense aggregation of oysters forming a large colony. Because oyster larvae need to settle on hard substrates, new oyster reefs form on stone or hard marine debris. Later, the oyster reef will grow by spat settling on the shells of older or nonliving oysters. These dense aggregations of oysters are also called oyster reefs, oyster beds, oyster banks, oyster bottoms, or oyster bars, with no clear distinction and with regional variation.

== Degradation of oyster reefs ==
Oyster reefs were once common in estuaries around the world. Over the last few centuries there have been significant declines in the extent and condition of oyster reefs globally, driven by overharvesting of oysters for food provision, lime production, and coastal degradation. Boat wakes can cause oyster shells to be swept toward the shore, where they build up over time into exposed piles in which any remaining oysters will desiccate and die. These piles may also isolate littoral areas from tides and currents, leading to further habitat degradation. Laboratory experiments suggest that in areas of faster flow and higher amounts of suspended sediment, as would be seen in a high-traffic channel, the cyprid larvae of barnacles may outcompete larval oysters in settling onto substrate, a prerequisite for completing their respective life cycles.

In the United States Crassostrea virginica, the eastern oyster, was a major reef builder in the Chesapeake Bay until the late 19th century. Because of overfishing, environmental degradation, and disease, populations of C. virginica underwent a drastic reduction in population size. There is an established pattern connecting human fishing practices, such as dredging, to oyster population collapse across the globe. Besides the collapse of C. virginica reefs on the east coast of the United States, populations of the Olympia oyster, Ostrea lurida, on the western coast of the United States and the Sydney rock oyster, Saccostrea glomerata, of eastern Australia have both been heavily impacted by harmful fishing practices. While most research has focused on temperate zones it is likely that significant declines have also occurred in tropical regions.

The IUCN's Overall Risk Category assessment of the oyster reef ecosystem in southern and eastern Australia has labeled them as critically endangered.

== Oyster reef ecology ==
Natural oyster reefs are composed of living and dead oyster shells and provide important habitat for various species. For example, the complex three-dimensional interstitial spaces within oyster reefs provide refugia for prey or juvenile species, which increases prey biomass and thereby enhances trophic transfer. Oyster reefs also stabilize shorelines by promoting sediment deposition and buffering wave energy, thereby allowing other habitats such as sea grass beds and marsh areas to form while simultaneously decreasing erosion of the shoreline.

== Ecosystem services ==
The filter feeding behavior of oysters can buffer against environmental degradation caused by human-induced eutrophication of estuary systems. Oysters feed on suspended phytoplankton and other organic matter. Disruption of the filter feeding by oysters can lead to a decrease in the elimination of organic matter from the water column and increase phytoplankton abundance. This in turn may lead to seasonal anoxia, which could increase mortality for other estuary animals, such as fish.

Oyster reefs can also impact the carbon sequestration and excess nutrient uptake. Oyster reefs also stabilize shorelines by promoting sediment deposition and buffering wave energy, thereby allowing other habitats such as sea grass beds and marsh areas to form while simultaneously decreasing erosion of the shoreline. Oyster reef habitats have been recognized as green infrastructure for shoreline protection.

== Mangrove Encroachment ==
Red mangroves (Rhizophora mangle) growing on an oyster reef in Mosquito Lagoon, Florida.

Both oysters reefs and mangroves stabilize our coastal environments, but mangroves are expanding in new territories. Rising temperatures have led to the tropicalization of many temperate regions, and this has led to a northward mangrove migration. A decrease in freeze events has allowed mangroves to thrive year-round in new places, some on intertidal oyster reefs. In Mosquito Lagoon, Florida, there has been an increase in mangrove abundance on oyster reefs of 198% since 1984, almost 6% yearly. Mangroves tend to start growing on reefs when their propagules become trapped, due to the complexity of the terrain. In as little as 8 years, reef coverage can be completely overtaken by mangrove stands.

Mangrove-driven shell dissolution is leading to a decrease in oyster reef size, and increase in mangrove dominance. The shells of oysters are at risk of dissolution when met with acidic conditions, and mangroves are linked to soil acidification. This puts oysters shells at risk of altered pH conditions in their habitat. Mangrove-dominated oyster reefs face higher percentages of shell mass loss than oyster-dominated sites, with transitional reefs intermediate of the two. Prop roots of red mangroves tend to trap sediment, burying oysters underneath, possibly subjecting them to an additional source of increased acidity.

== Restoration ==
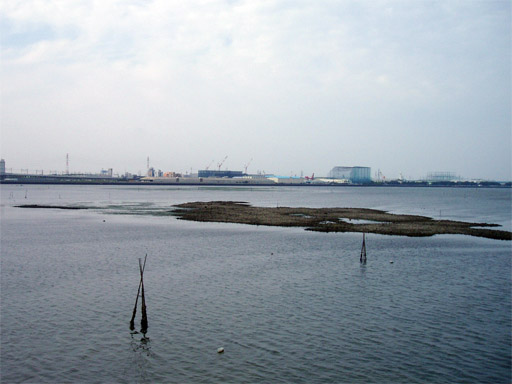
Oyster Reef

Oyster reef restoration has accelerated in recent decades. Oyster reef restoration projects often place the sanitized shells of dead oysters, concrete, or limestone pieces on a soft bottom to encourage oyster spat settlement. Restoration of intertidal eastern oyster reefs can match natural densities of oysters and mud crabs, and recover oyster stability in about 6 years. Additional benefits to restoring these habitats includes suppressing phytoplankton blooms via increasing filter feeding behavior, increase nutrient sequestration and denitrification rates, increase nekton biomass, and potentially increase commercial fishery value. However, data on previously implemented restoration projects can be difficult to access, hindering future restoration efforts.

== See also ==
- Oyster reef restoration
- Rudists – extinct group of major reef-building bivalves in the Mesozoic Era
- Stromatolite
