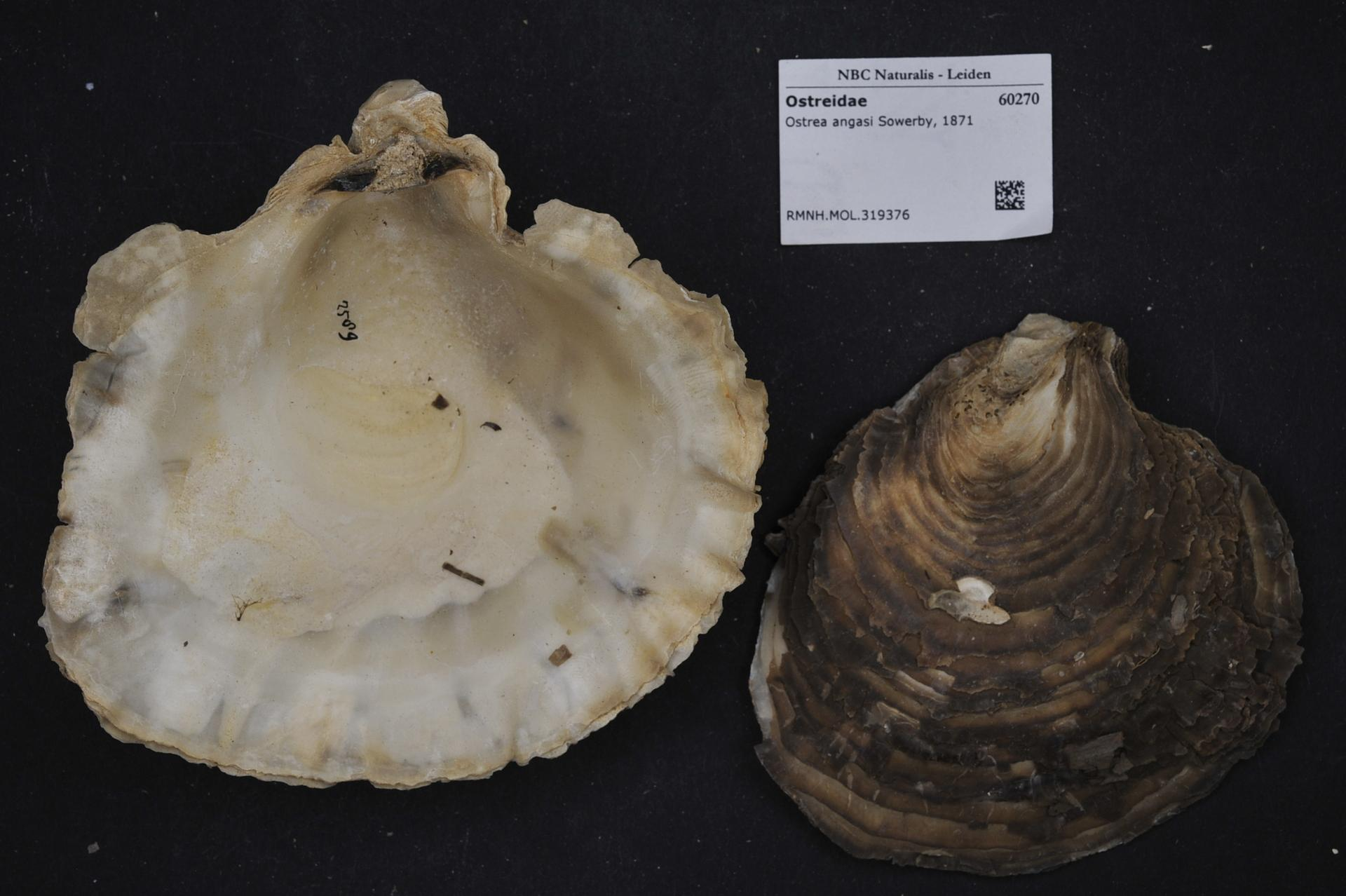

Scientific classification
- Kingdom: Animalia
- Phylum: Mollusca
- Class: Bivalvia
- Order: Ostreida
- Family: Ostreidae
- Genus: Ostrea
- Species: O. angasi

Binomial name
- Ostrea angasi Sowerby, 1871

= Ostrea angasi =

Species of oyster endemic to southern Australia

The southern mud oyster, Australian flat oyster, native flat oyster, native mud oyster, or angasi oyster (Ostrea angasi), is endemic to southern Australia, ranging from Western Australia to southeast New South Wales and around Tasmania. Ostrea angasi superficially resembles Ostrea edulis and both species may be referred to with the name "flat oyster". However, the two species do not occur naturally in the same geographic distribution.

== Habitat ==
This species is found in sheltered, silty or sand-bottomed estuaries at depths between 1 and 30 metres.

== Diet ==
Flat oysters, like all other oyster species, are filter feeders, feeding on, and taking in anything small enough to be filtered in their gills. This may include plankton, microalgae or inorganic material.

== Predators ==
Oyster growers at Coffin Bay, South Australia have observed stingrays eating their experimental commercial stocks of Ostrea angasi.

== Commercial harvesting ==
Extensive oyster reefs in southern Australia were largely destroyed by over-exploitation during the 19th and early 20th Centuries. Oysters were dredged directly from the seabed.

Once common, Ostrea angasi became locally extinct, in oyster-producing estuaries on the East Coast north of the Clyde River, as a result of the accidental introduction of the mud worm, Polydora websteri, from New Zealand, in 1888 to 1898. The mudworm and silting ended all sub-tidal oyster production in New South Wales and Southern Queensland, and the oyster industry there became totally dependent upon inter-tidal production of another indigenous oyster, the Sydney rock oyster, Saccostrea glomerata.

In the 21st century, commercial oyster growers in southern Australia have started experimentally farming O. angasi as a means to diversify their businesses. This was prompted by other growers suffering massive stock losses of introduced Pacific oyster, Crassostrea gigas, resulting from outbreaks of Pacific Oyster Mortality Syndrome (POMS).

== Not-for-profit projects ==
=== Port Adelaide River estuary ===
The not-for-profit organisation Estuary Care Foundation was established in South Australia to undertake trials growing Ostrea angasi in the Port River and adjacent waters. The organisation is also involved in seagrass monitoring and restoration work within the Port River. Estuary Care Foundation now operates as Friends of Port River. Around 2022 the Estuary Care Foundation Rigid Oyster Basket project as taken up by OzFish Unlimited, via the (now) OzFish Adelaide & Fleurieu Chapter. Larger scale deployment of the ROBs in the Port Adelaide Inner Harbour is scheduled for early 2025.

=== Windara Reef ===
Windara Reef was constructed in Gulf St Vincent, offshore from Ardrossan, to promote the reestablishment of Ostrea angasi. The reef was also opened to recreational fishers in 2017. As of April 2019, it was the largest shellfish reef restoration project in the southern hemisphere. The Nature Conservancy, the Australian Government, the South Australian Government, the Yorke Peninsula Council, The University of Adelaide and the Ian Potter Foundation have each contributed to funding the project.

=== Georges River and Botany Bay ===
It was announced, in 2023, that work would begin on re-establishing three sub-tidal oyster reefs in the Georges River estuary in New South Wales (at Audrey Bay, Coronation Bay and on the eastern side of Taren Point), and another sub-tidal reef downstream in Botany Bay. The reefs were intended to support reintroduced Ostrea angasi—locally extinct in those waters since 1896—and also the now depleted Sydney Rock Oyster, Saccostrea glomerata. By April 2024, for the first time in well over a century, the Native or Flat oyster was present in the estuary. In December 2024, additional funding of the reefs was announced. It is envisaged that the presence of the oyster reefs in the bay and estuary will increase both water quality and biodiversity, including an increase in the numbers of fish living there. Construction of reefs was proceeding during 2025.
