= Eastern oyster =

- Oyster bed in the Marshes of Glynn, Brunswick, Georgia, USA

Conservation status
- Vulnerable (NatureServe)

Scientific classification
- Kingdom: Animalia
- Phylum: Mollusca
- Class: Bivalvia
- Order: Ostreida
- Family: Ostreidae
- Genus: Crassostrea
- Species: C. virginica

Binomial name
- Crassostrea virginica (Gmelin, 1791)

Synonyms
- Crassostrea floridensis Sowerby; Dioeciostrea americana Orton, 1928; Lopha gibsonsmithi Macsotay & Campos, 2001; Ostraea floridensis G.B. Sowerby II, 1871; Ostraea reniformis G.B. Sowerby II, 1871; Ostraea rostrata Chemnitz, 1785; Ostrea borealis Lamarck, 1819; Ostrea canadensis Lamarck, 1819; Ostrea procyon Holmes, 1858; Ostrea triangularis Holmes, 1856; Ostrea virginiana Röding, 1798; Ostrea virginica Gmelin, 1791

Species of bivalve

The eastern oyster (Crassostrea virginica)—also called the Atlantic oyster, American oyster, or East Coast oyster—is a species of true oyster native to eastern North and South America. Other names in local or culinary use include the Wellfleet oyster, Virginia oyster, Malpeque oyster, Blue Point oyster, Chesapeake Bay oyster, and Apalachicola oyster. C. virginica ranges from northern New Brunswick south through parts of the West Indies to Venezuela. It is farmed in all of the Maritime provinces of Canada and all Eastern Seaboard and Gulf states of the United States, as well as Puget Sound, Washington, where it is known as the Totten Inlet Virginica. It was introduced to the Hawaiian Islands in the 19th century and is common in Pearl Harbor.

The eastern oyster is an important commercial species. Its distribution has been affected by habitat change; less than 1% of the population present when the first European colonists arrived is thought to remain in the Chesapeake Bay and its tributaries. As of 2014, the global conservation status of Crassostrea virginica, as assessed by NatureServe, is vulnerable, as the oyster's populations are threatened by overharvest and water pollution. Other threats to the eastern oyster include global warming, diseases and parasites, and competition with invasive species.

== Description ==
Like all oysters, C. virginica is a bivalve mollusk with a hard calcium carbonaceous shell that protects it from predation.

This particular type of oyster is important to its ecosystem. Like all oysters, C. virginica is a filter feeder. It sucks in water and filters out the plankton and detritus to swallow, then spits the water back out, thus cleaning the water around it. One oyster can filter up to 50 gallons of water in 24 hours. Eastern oysters also provide a key structural element within their ecosystem, making them a foundation species in many environments, and they serve as ecosystem engineers in western Atlantic estuaries. Like coral reefs, oyster beds, also known as oyster reefs, provide key habitat for a variety of different species by creating hard substrate for attachment and habitation. Oyster beds have an estimated 50 times the surface area of an equally sized flat bottom. The beds also attract a high concentration of larger predators looking for food.

The eastern oyster, like all members of the family Ostreidae, can make small pearls to surround particles that enter the shell. These pearls, however, are insignificant in size and of no monetary value; the pearl oyster, from which commercial pearls are harvested, is of a different family.

Unlike most bivalves, whose shells are aragonite, adult eastern oysters have calcite shells. The larvae, however, retain the aragonite shell of their ancestors. The specific gravity of the two types of shell is similar, so neither would confer a weight advantage over the other for a freely swimming larva. The transition to the thicker calcite shell in the adult of this species is thought to be an adaptation for defense against predators because the oysters are immobilized in exposed locations.

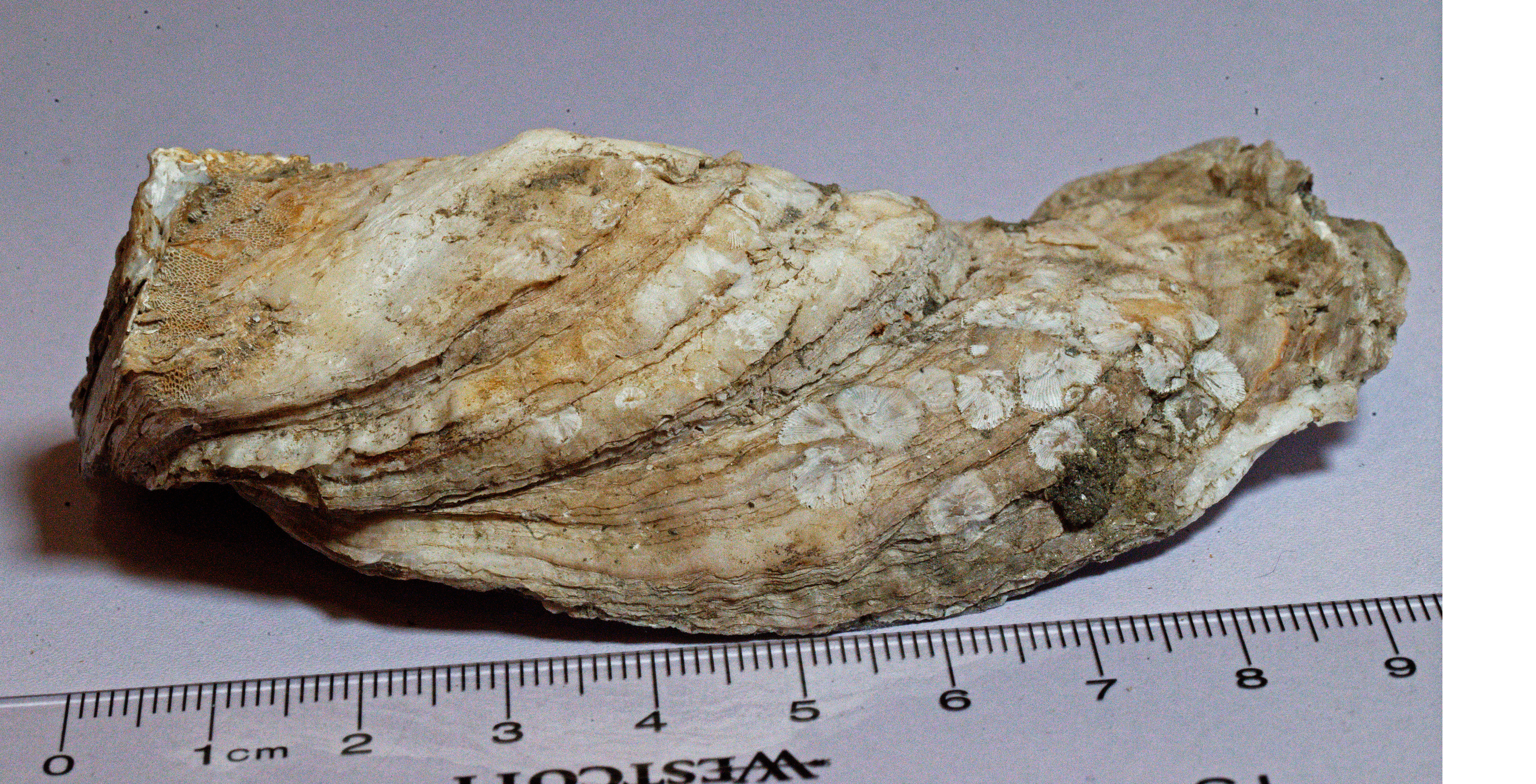
Side

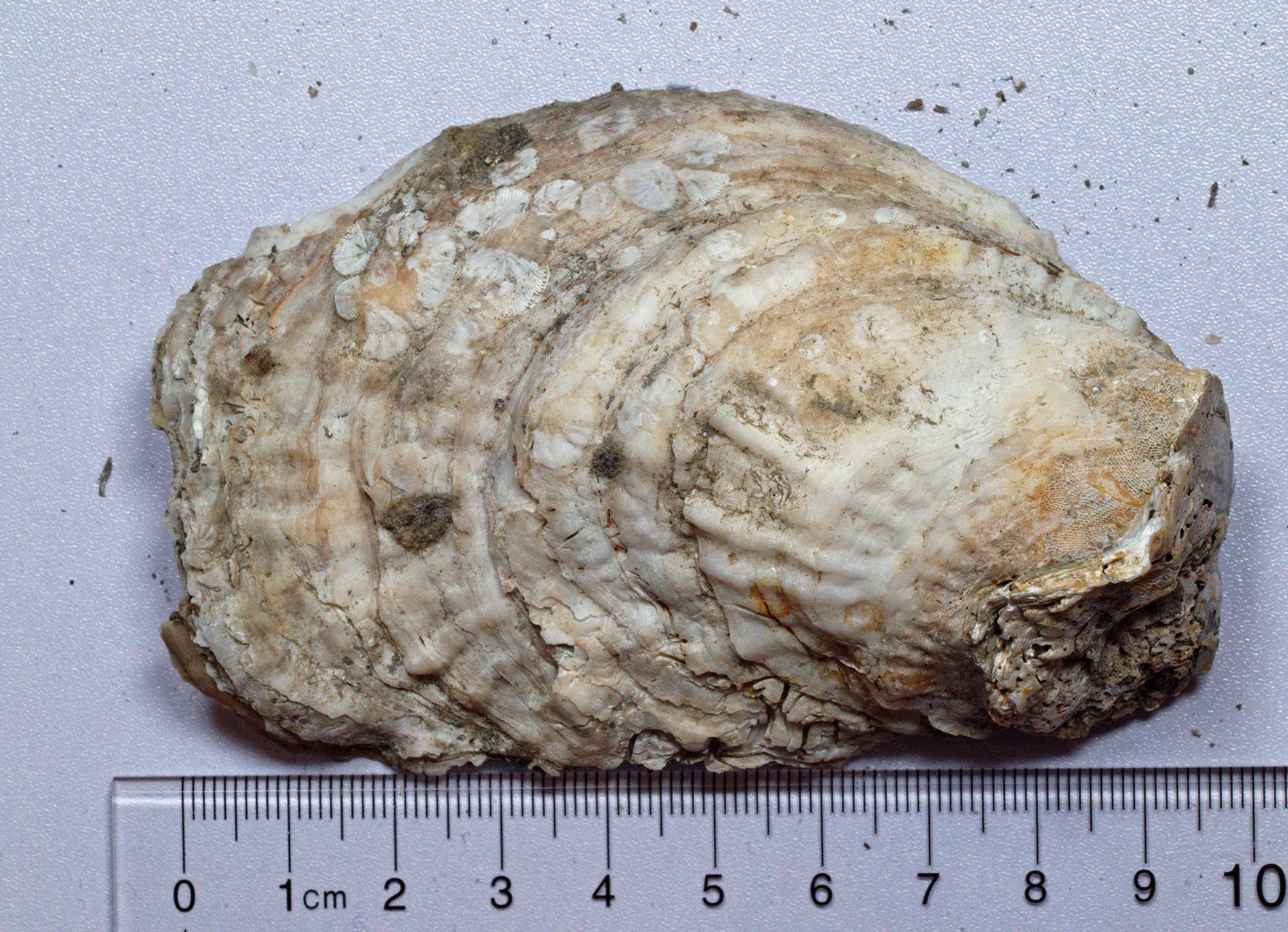
Outside

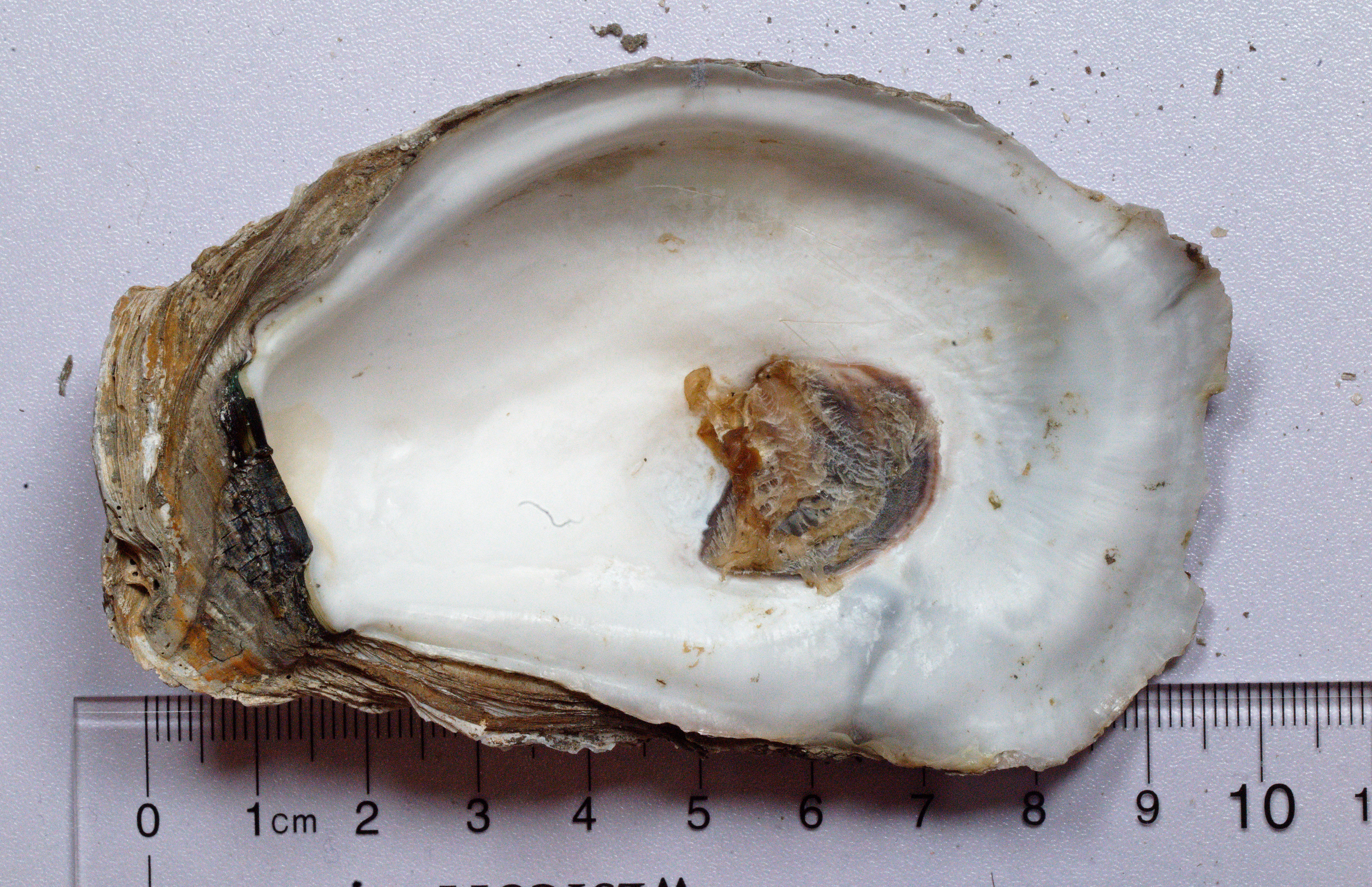
Inside

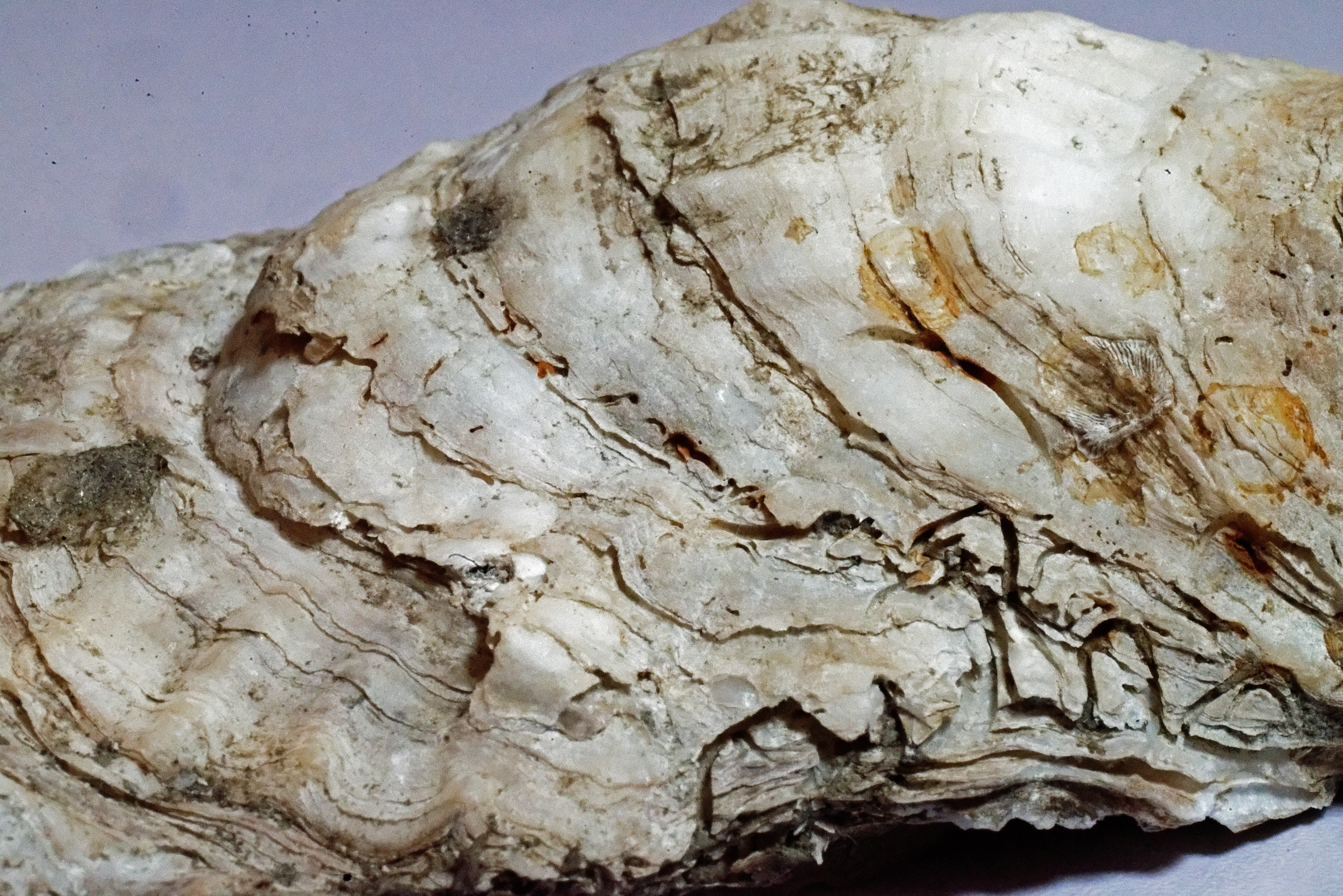

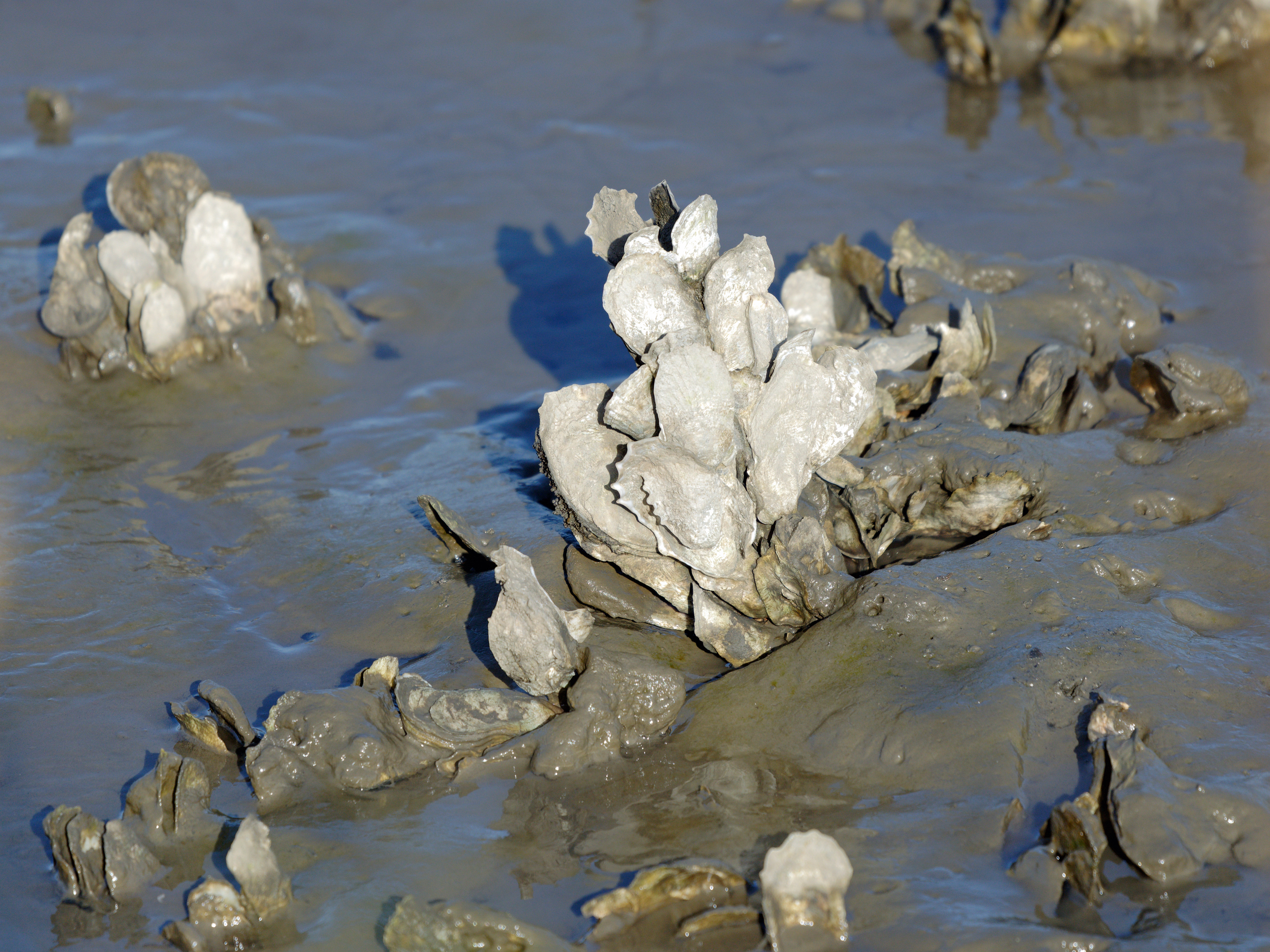
Cluster of oysters

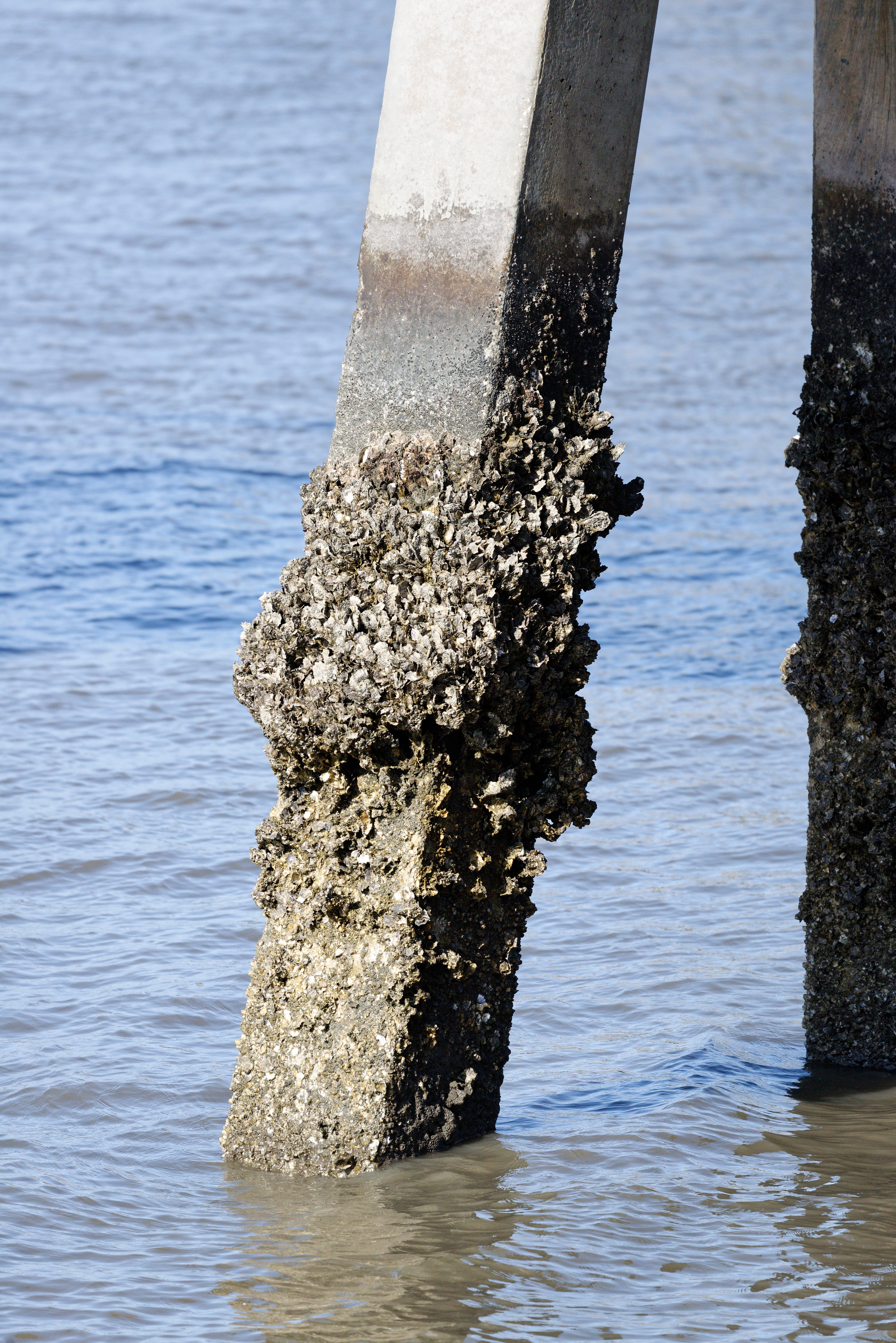
Oysters growing on a post

== Life cycle ==
The life cycle of C. virginica consists of spawn, floating fertilized egg, trochophore, swimming straight-hinge veliger, swimming late veliger, swimming and crawling pediveliger, early spat, later spat, and adult oysters. Spawning of C. virginica is controlled by water temperatures and varies from north to south; northern oysters spawn at temperatures between 60 and 68 °F (16 and 20 °C), whereas southern oysters spawn at temperatures above 68 °F (20 °C). Spawning can occur throughout the warm months.

Eastern oysters can reach sexual maturity at four months old in southern waters. The eastern oyster's reproductive cycle begins during late summer and autumn months with the storage of glycogen energy reserves. This glycogen is then used to support gametogenesis during the next winter and early spring when food intake is at a minimum. The gametes begin to mature in late spring and then, from June to August, they are spawned into the water column, where fertilization occurs. Each female produces from 75 to 150 million eggs, but only one in a thousand survives. Fertilized eggs develop in about six hours into planktonic, free-swimming, trochophore larvae, also known as the early umbo stage, which have cilia and a small shell. The trochophore larvae depend on their internal yolk supply for energy. They then develop within 12 to 24 hours into a fully shelled veliger larvae, also known as the late umbo stage, which has a hinged side and a velum. During this time, the shelled veliger larvae use their ciliated vela to capture food and swim. The larvae remain planktonic for about 2 to 3 weeks, depending on food and temperature conditions, and towards the end of this period, they develop into pediveliger larvae, also known as eyed larvae, which have an umbo, an eyespot, and a foot. During this time. the pediveliger larvae settle to the bottom, where they seek a hard substrate. Ideally, the pediveliger larvae try to locate an adult oyster shell to which they attach, often as part of an existing oyster reef, but other hard surfaces will suffice. Upon settling, a larva cements its left valve to the substrate and metamorphoses into an oyster spat by discarding its velum, reabsorbing its foot, and enlarging its gills. During the first year of life, C. virginica oysters are protandric. Most spat are male, but once they reach sexual maturity, some males change to females after the first or second spawning. Some females may change back to males again.

C. virginica has been used to study oxidative DNA damage caused by environmental heat stress. These studies indicated that heat shock driven oxidative stress induces increased oxidative damage in DNA (e.g. measured as 8-OHdG formation) and cellular apoptosis (programmed cell death) in the gills of American oysters.

== Regional histories ==
=== Chesapeake Bay ===
==== Before industrial harvesting ====
Before Columbus and the rise of industrial oyster operations, oysters abounded in the bay. Oysters first arrived in the Chesapeake 5,000 years ago, and shortly after, local Indians began eating them. Archaeologists found evidence the local Native Americans returned to the same place to collect oysters for 3,000 years. John Smith, on a voyage up the Chesapeake, stated oysters "lay as thick as stones." Because of the abundance of oysters filtering the waters of the Chesapeake, the water was much clearer than it is now. Visibility would sometimes reach 20 feet. When the English began settling the area, they evidently had a localized impact of the oyster population. One archaeological site measured oyster sizes near Maryland's old capital St. Mary's city from 1640 to 1710. In 1640, when the city was still small, oysters measured 80 mm, and in the city's maximum population in 1690, they measured to 40 mm. When the capital moved to Annapolis, the population moved with it, and by 1710, the oysters were back up to 80 mm. However, the effect of overharvesting would remain local until after the Civil War, when a combination of new technologies led to the removal of nearly all the bay oysters.

==== Industrial oyster harvesting ====
During the industrial revolution, several new technologies were introduced to the Chesapeake Bay area which allowed for more intensive oyster harvesting. First was the invention of canning. This allowed oysters to be preserved much longer, and created demand for oysters across the world. Secondly, the invention of the dredge enabled oyster harvesters to reach untouched depths of the Chesapeake. And finally, the proliferation of steam-powered ships and railroads made transportation more reliable, enabling merchants to sell oysters far and wide. Estimates for the harvest in 1839 give a figure of 700,000 bushels. After the Civil War, dredges were legalized, and harvesting exploded to 5 million bushels that year. By 1875, 17 million bushels were taken from the bay. The harvesting would reach its peak in the 1880s, with 20 million bushels being harvested from the bay each year. Not only were they being taken for food, but also oyster reefs, where oysters had built hills of their dead shells over thousands of generations, were being dredged out. Surplus oyster shells had many uses then. They were ground into mortar, used as filler in roads, and as a source of lime in agricultural fertilizer. By the 1920s, harvests would be down to just 3–5 million bushels per year because of overharvesting.

==== Decline and disease ====
Overharvesting eventually depleted the remaining oyster population in the bay to just 1% of its historical level, where it stands today. Oyster harvests began to decline in the 1890s. They were being taken much faster than they could reproduce. Also, many of the shells and reefs were being taken and not being replaced. Oyster spat need a hard surface on which to attach, and these were vanishing because of the destruction of oyster reefs. By the 1920s, harvests were down to 3–5 million bushels per year, stabilized for a time by returning oyster shells back to the bay. But in the 1950s, the weakened oyster population had to deal with the diseases "dermo" and MSX. These decimated the remaining oyster population. The parasites which carried the disease are alien to eastern waters, and they were thought to have been brought to the Chesapeake by Asian oysters. Currently, oyster harvests average less than 200,000 bushels a year.

== Commercial value ==
Capture (blue) and aquaculture (green) production of Crassostrea virginica in thousand tonnes from 1950 to 2022, as reported by the FAO

The eastern oyster used to be of great commercial value. Due to the steep decline in the number of oysters in various traditionally harvested areas, primarily because of overfishing and diseases, the annual catch has declined significantly. In Maryland, the 2006–2007 catch was 165,059 bushels (about 7600 m^{3}) of oysters. Other regions of the East Coast of the United States have successful oyster farms, including most notably Cotuit, Martha's Vineyard and Wellfleet, Massachusetts, on Cape Cod.

== Effects of the BP Deepwater Horizon oil spill ==
Harvestable size of a C. virginica oyster is 75 mm (3.0 in), which can take from 12 to 36 months, depending on temperature, salinity of the water, and food supply. Salinity is a very important climatological variable that affects spatfall. Oysters do best where salinities range from 10 to 30 ppt; the range of 15 to 18 ppt is considered optimal. Typically, when salinity levels are less than 6 ppt, larvae will not settle and metamorphose into spat. In 2010, 665 miles of coastline were affected by the Deepwater Horizon oil spill. To keep the oil at bay and to spare the oystermen, the authorities of Louisiana made an unprecedented decision to maximize the fresh water flow through the region's canals to three times usual levels. At the mouth of the canals, salinity fell to almost zero, which was probably why most of the oysters died. Sujata Gupta ventured into the marshlands and Gulf of Mexico with Brad Robin, a man from a line of generations of oystermen in southeastern Louisiana. Robin and his crew threw a net over the side to haul in a catch. There were dozens of palm-sized oysters, but 75% of them were "boxes" or empty shells. However, as they traveled further towards the Gulf of Mexico, where the water was less salinity-stressed by the flush, only 20% of the haul came back as boxes, a promising sign the oysters are trying to come back. Gupta reported, "Now since there are so many empty shells scattered on the sea floor, the larvae have more to latch onto, improving their odds". However, salinity levels are not the only concern. Eastern oysters are filter feeders, so they are greatly affected by their surroundings since they are sessile organisms. This means if the water around them was contaminated with oil and the dispersant used to get rid of the oil, then these chemicals were collected by the oysters as they filtered the water. This is cause for great concern that the oysters are being killed by the toxins in the dispersant, as well. An added dilemma is oysters are in their weakest state after spawning season, which may have caused some of them to close their shells, resulting in death by suffocation within just a few days due to warm temperatures in the Gulf if the shells remain closed. The toxins in the oil and dispersants can also kill the larvae. To highlight the recovery of the state's oyster industry, the shell of C. virginica cut into cabochons was made Louisiana's official state gem in 2011.

== Diseases ==
"Dermo" (Perkinsus marinus) is a marine disease of oysters, caused by a protozoan parasite. It is a prevalent pathogen of oysters, causing massive mortality in oyster populations, and poses a significant economic threat to the oyster industry.

Multinucleated sphere X (MSX) (Haplosporidium nelsoni), another protozoan, was first described along the mid-Atlantic coast in 1957. Mortalities can reach 90% to 95% of the oyster population within 2 to 3 years of being seeded. MSX slows the feeding rates of infected oysters, leading to a reduction in the amount of stored carbohydrates, which in turn inhibits normal gametogenesis during spawning, resulting in reduced fecundity.

== Recognition ==
The eastern oyster is the state shellfish of Connecticut, its shell is the state shell of Virginia and Mississippi, and its shell in cabochon form is the state gem of Louisiana.
