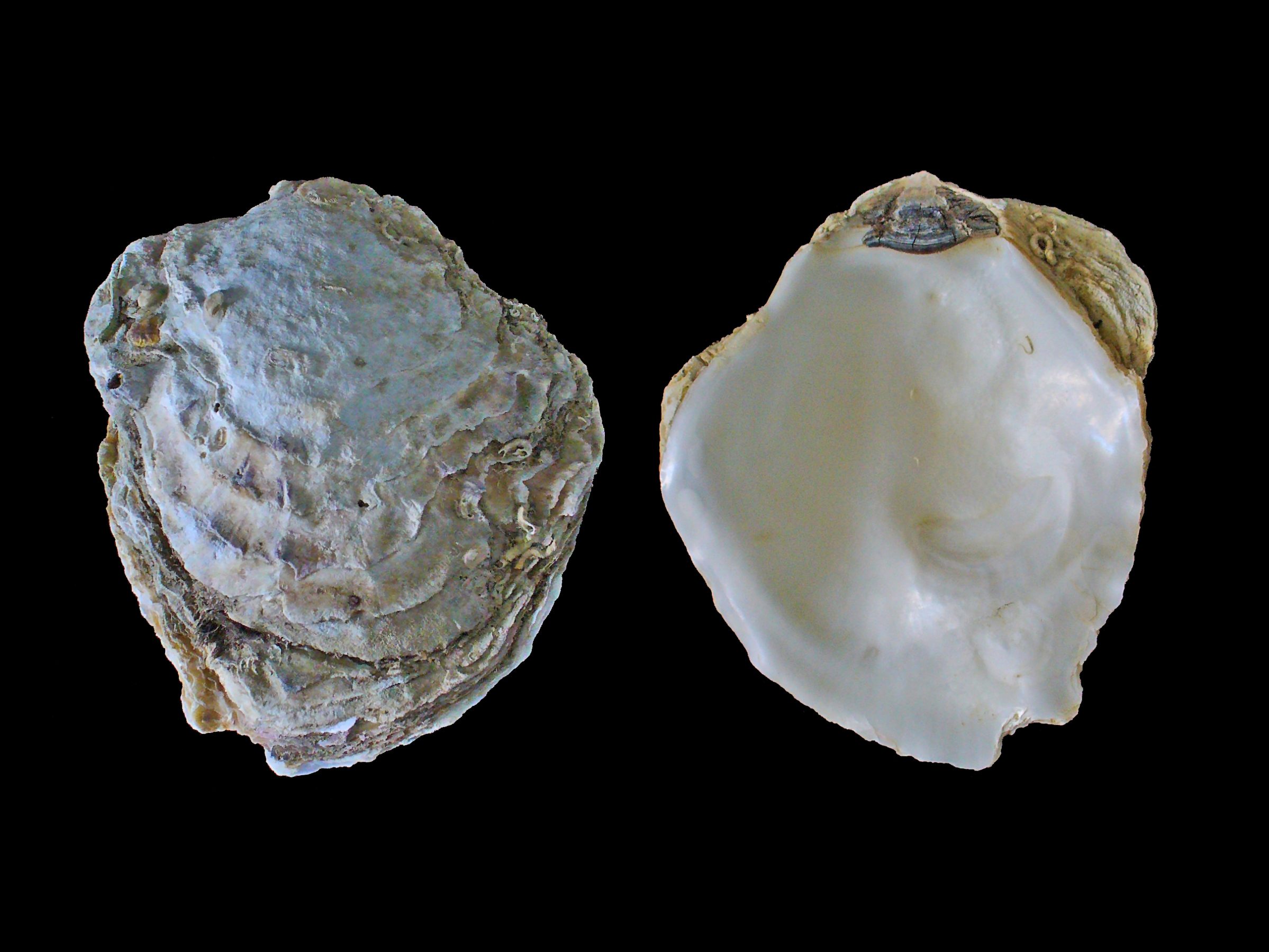
- Valves of Ostrea edulis

Scientific classification
- Kingdom: Animalia
- Phylum: Mollusca
- Class: Bivalvia
- Order: Ostreida
- Family: Ostreidae
- Genus: Ostrea
- Species: O. edulis

Binomial name
- Ostrea edulis Linnaeus, 1758

= Ostrea edulis =

Ostrea edulis Temporal range: Miocene – Recent

Species of oyster

Ostrea edulis, commonly known as the European flat oyster, is a species of oyster native to Europe. In Great Britain and Ireland, localized names include Colchester native oyster, mud oyster, or edible oyster. In France, Ostrea edulis are known as huîtres plates (flat oysters) except for those that come from the Belon River estuary in Brittany, France, which are known as Belons.

The fossil record of this species dates back to the Miocene (age range: 15.97 million years ago to present day). Fossils have been found in Belgium, Italy, the Netherlands, Egypt, Greece, Spain, the United Kingdom, Austria, France and Germany.

== Description ==
Right and left valve of the same specimen:

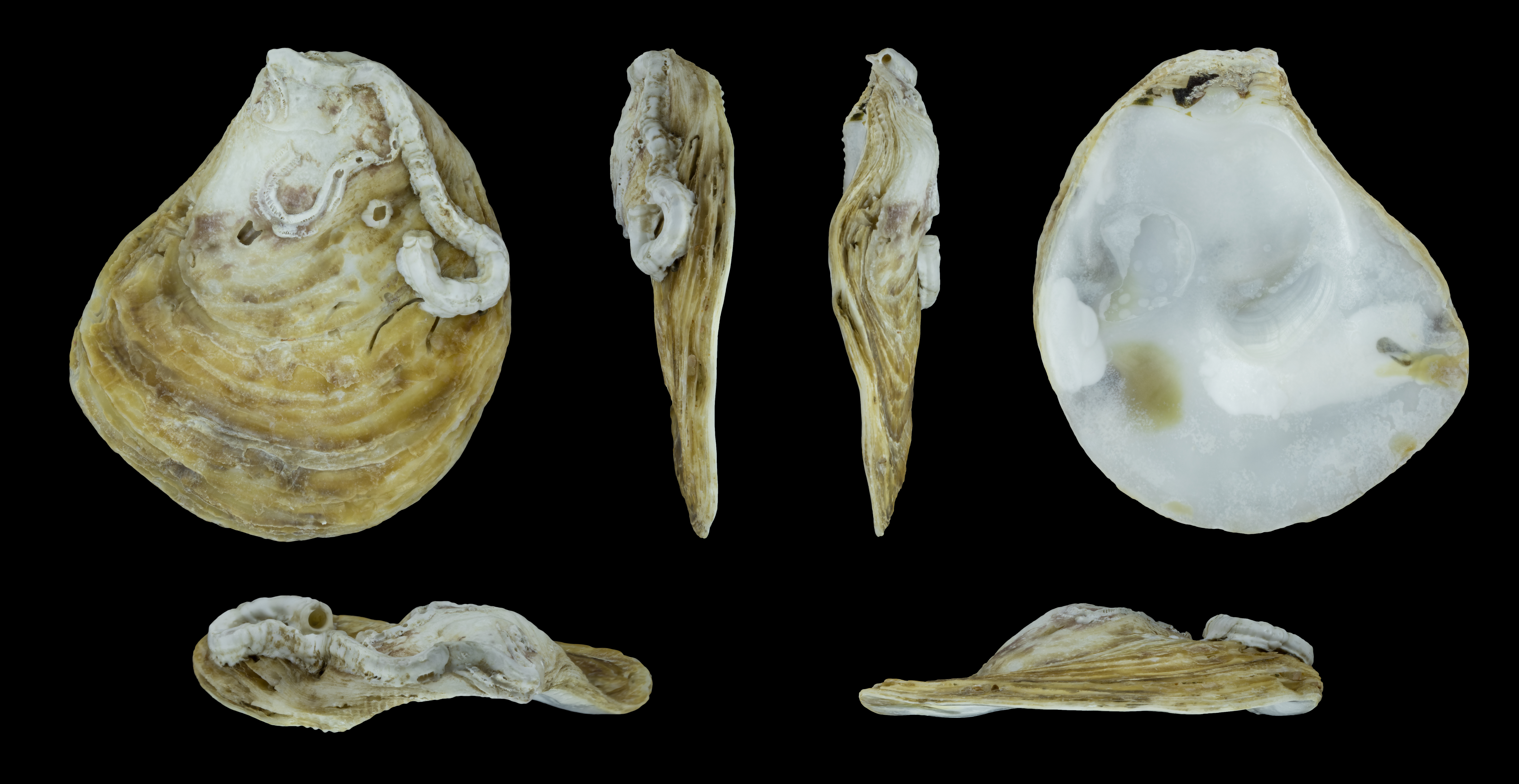
Right valve

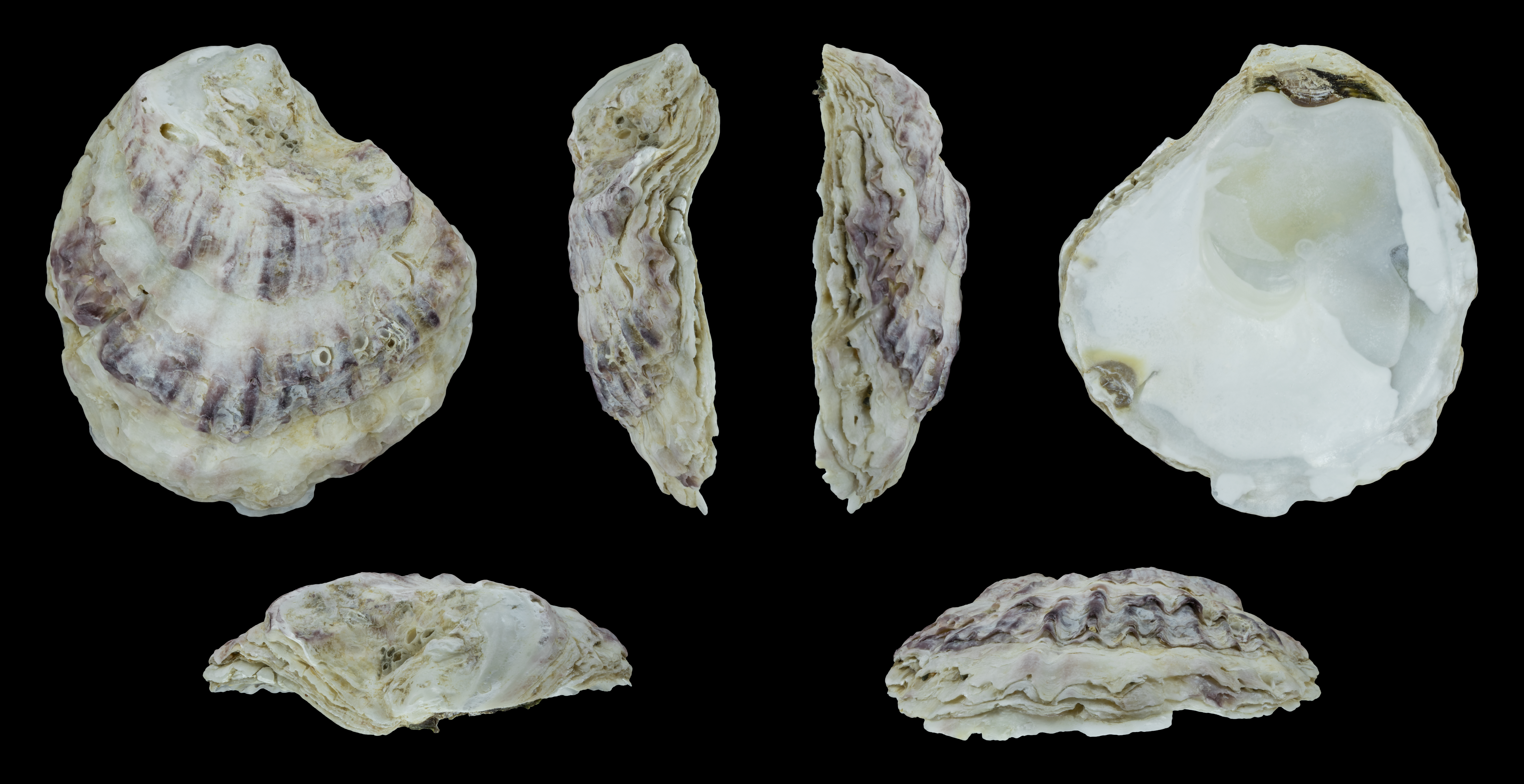
Left valve

Fossil (Pliocene)

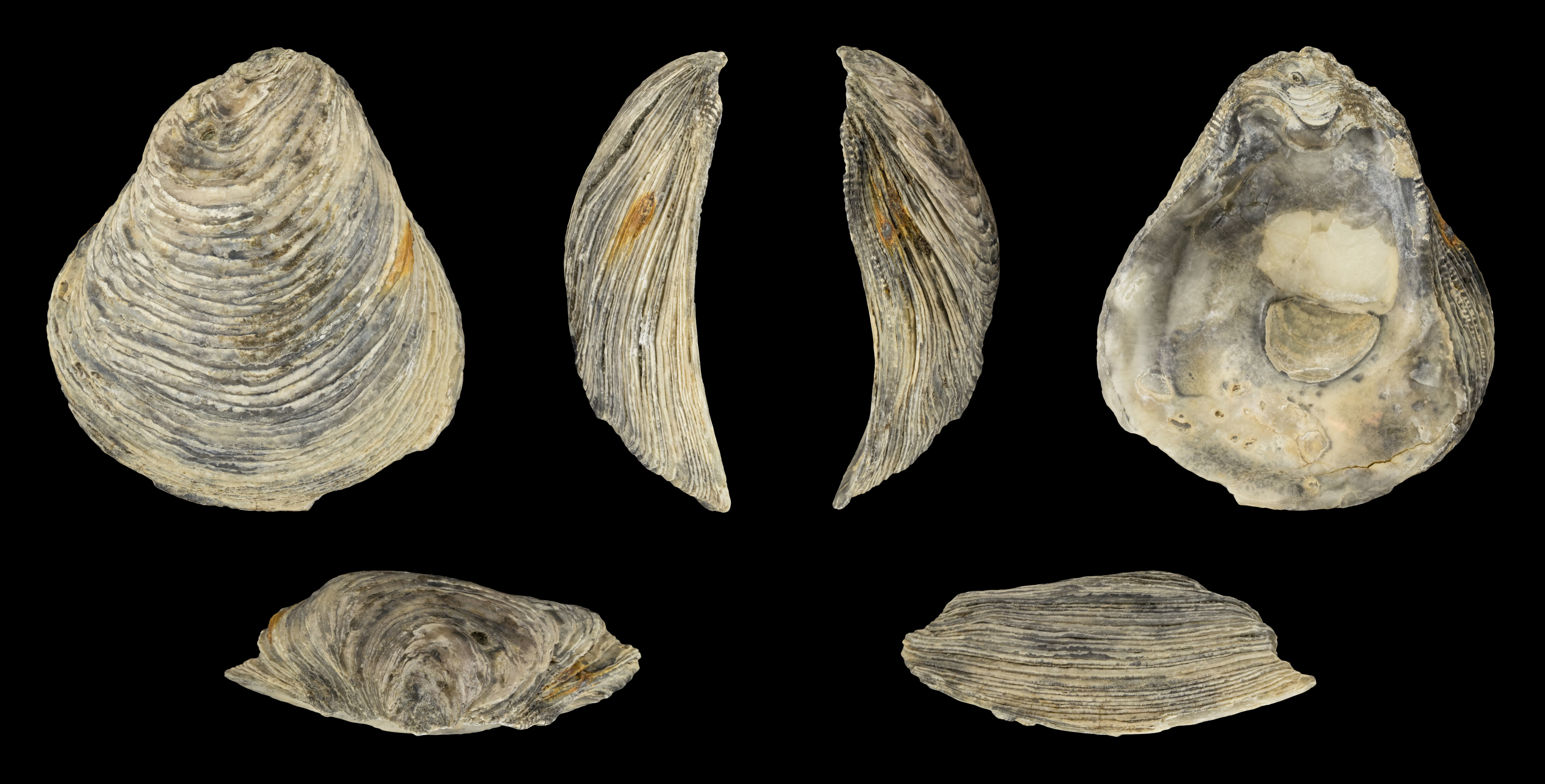
Right valve

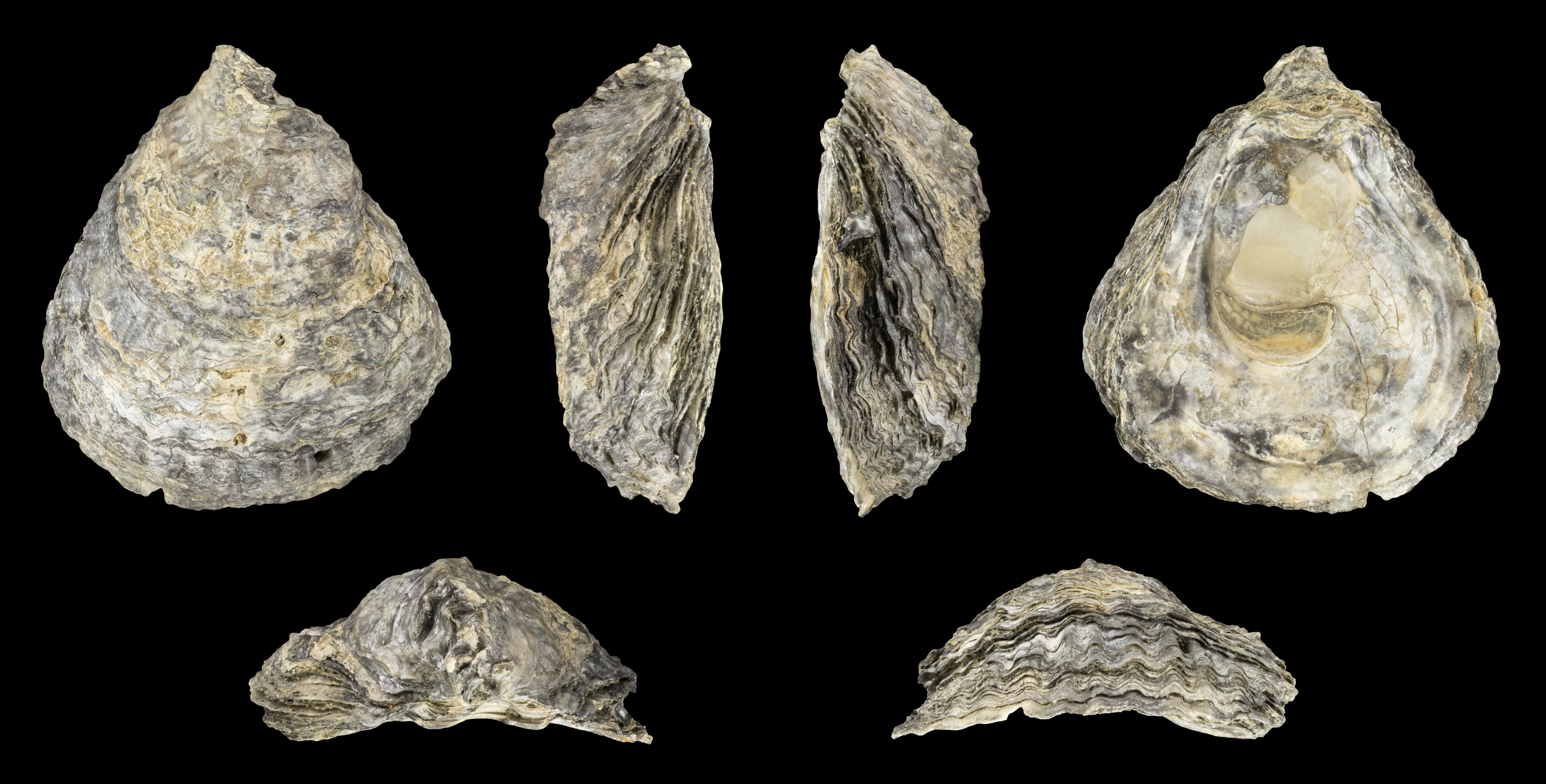
Left valve

When mature, O. edulis adults range from 3.8 to 11 centimetres (1.5 to 4.3 in) across.

Shells are oval or pear shaped, white, yellowish or cream in colour, with a rough outer surface showing pale brown or bluish concentric bands on the right valve. The two valves are quite different in shape and size, as the left one is concave and fixed to the substratum, while the right one is almost flat and fits inside the left. The inner surface is smooth, whitish or bluish-grey.

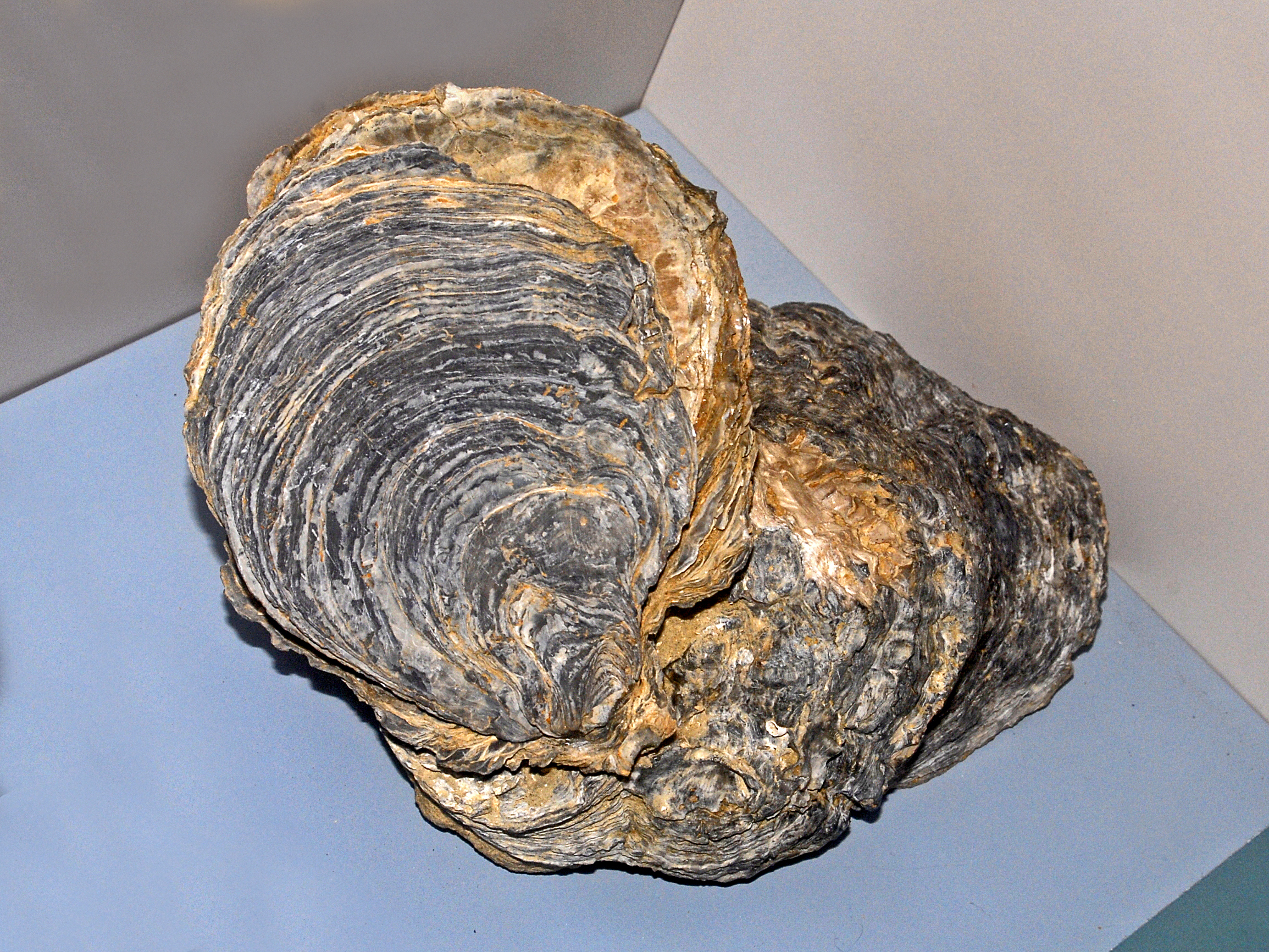
Fossil of Ostrea edulis from Pliocene of Italy

== Biology ==
The majority of Ostrea edulis start life as males. Sexual maturity is reached after a period between eight and ten months. and may change sex depending on the water temperature, among other factors. Usually the lifespan can reach about six years, with a maximum of 15 years. Adult oysters feed by filtration.

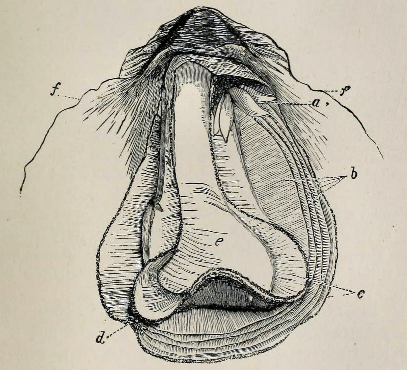
Ostrea edulis; a) labial palpi b) gills c) mantle d) junction of the two folds of the mantle e) large adductor muscle f) the shell

== Distribution ==
The species naturally ranges along the western and southern coasts of Europe from Norway to Morocco and including most of the British Isles and the Mediterranean coast. Naturally viable populations have appeared in eastern North America from Maine to Rhode Island subsequent to artificial introduction in the 1940s and 1950s.

== Habitat ==
Ostrea edulis can be found in estuarine and shallow coastal water with hard substrata of mud and rocks.

== Human use ==
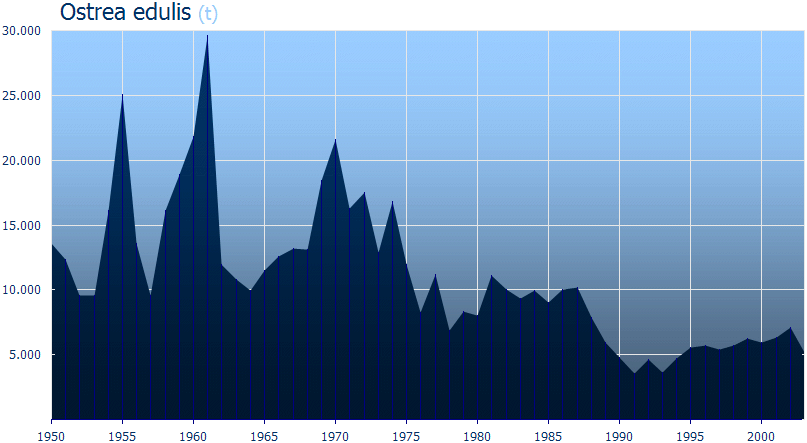
Worldwide O. edulis harvest in tonnes, 1950–2003

Ostrea edulis has been harvested throughout Europe as an important food source since prehistory. During Roman occupation of Britain O. edulis oysters were exported in large quantities back to Italy. However, due to their more robust nature and greater ease of cultivation the Pacific oysters, Crassostrea gigas, now account for more than 75 percent of Europe's oyster production.

European flat oysters are famously grown in Brittany, France. The true Belon oyster is cultivated in the Belon River, France, and has the AOC protected name. In the 1950s, Dutch scientists artificially introduced Belon oyster seed into the waters around Maine in hopes to establish a viable stock. The initial project was abandoned but ten years later natural colonies of flat oysters were found in the wild. Many North American suppliers use the name 'Belon' to species that are found in the wild throughout the United States.

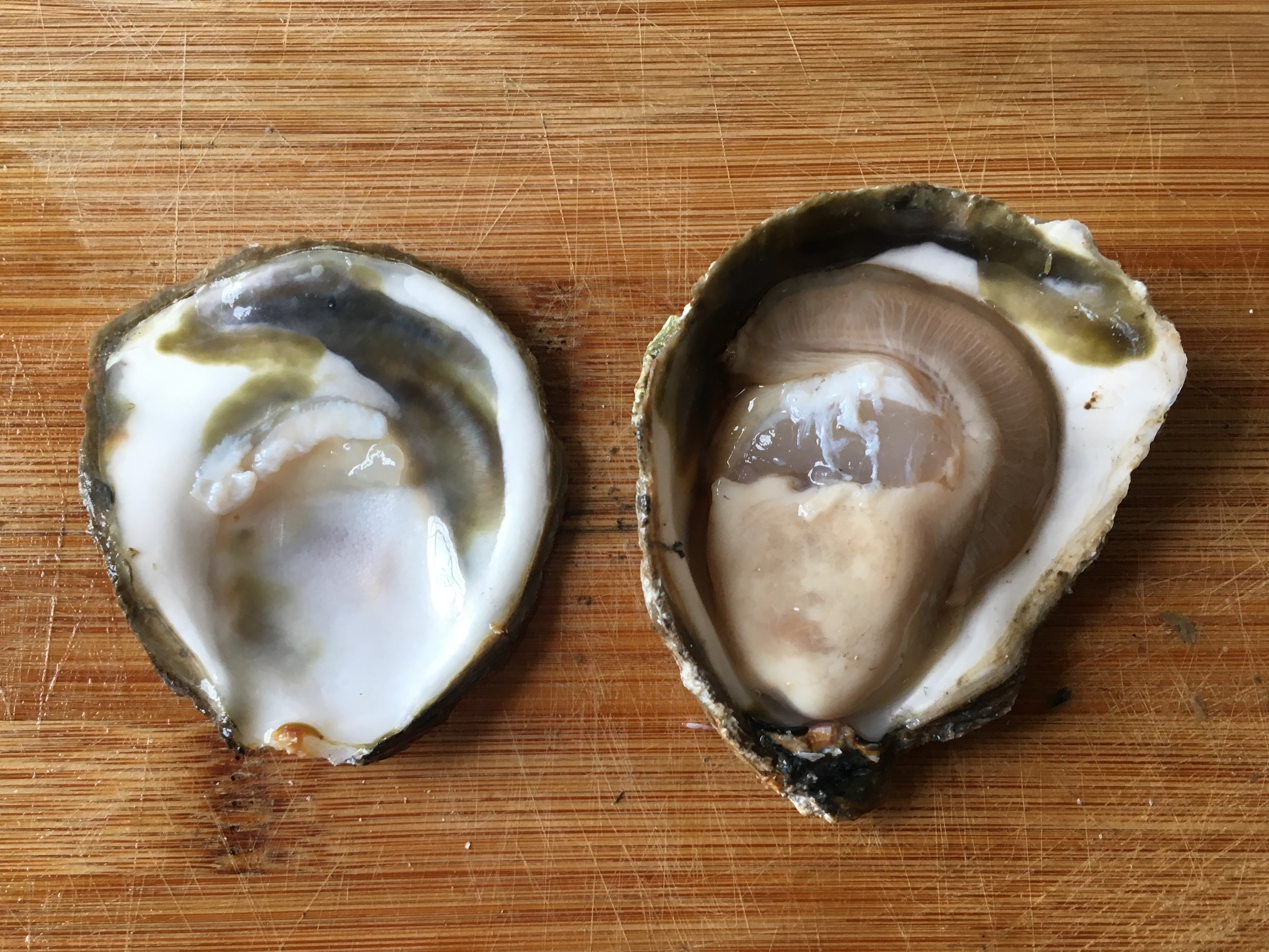
Loch Ryan oysters are sourced from Scotland's only commercial European flat oyster bed.

Ostrea edulis is now also being maricultured in the states of California, Maine, and Washington in the United States. The species once dominated European oyster production but disease, pollution, and overfishing sharply reduced the harvest. Currently, there are efforts across Germany, the UK, France, Scotland, and Wales to restore oyster reefs and maintain the habitat.

U.S. oyster growers farm O. edulis in small quantities on both coasts. They are prized for their unique tannic seawater flavour, sometimes described as dry and metallic, and are more expensive than other American oysters. The flavour is considered excellent for eating raw on the half shell.

The adductor muscle of the European flat in combination with the shape of the shell results in a somewhat weaker seal compared with other oyster species. It is common practice to use rubber bands to prevent oysters from spilling their liquor and dehydrating in storage before consumption.

== Safety ==
Raw Ostrea edulis oysters can harbor pathogenic Vibrio spp. and accumulate heavy metals including cadmium, lead, copper, and zinc in their tissues, posing potential health risks to consumers. A 2023 study of Boston Harbor found average edible tissue concentrations of zinc at 2,390 mg/kg and copper at 153 mg/kg, with total hazard quotients exceeding 1 when summed across trace elements, warranting further monitoring.

== See also ==
- Locmariaquer § History of oyster farming
