= Southern Electricity Supply =

Southern Electricity Supply (officially, Administrator of the Southern Electricity Supply of New South Wales) was a corporation sole that controlled and administered the electricity supply assets of the New South Wales Department of Public Works, from 1942 to 1950. It operated a number of coal-fired and hydro-electric power stations in New South Wales, and was a bulk electricity supplier to part of New South Wales, mainly in the south and south central-west of the state. In November 1950, its assets and operations were merged into the Electricity Commission of New South Wales.

== Origins ==
The New South Wales Department of Public Works (PWD)—not to be confused with the modern-day NSW Public Works organisation—was the government entity charged with overseeing construction of public buildings and infrastructure in New South Wales. Constructions managed by PWD included public buildings, dams, irrigation schemes, railways up to 1917, and for a time, ports outside Sydney. It was also responsible for maintaining these facilities.

By the turn of the 20th century such buildings and infrastructure were increasingly making use of electricity, or in the case of dams becoming potential sources of electrical power. If there was no available power supply connection feasible from another utility, then PWD became involved in providing that power, and thereby came to control power stations and power transmission lines that, once connected into a large network, became what was known as Southern Electricity Supply.

=== Sydney ===
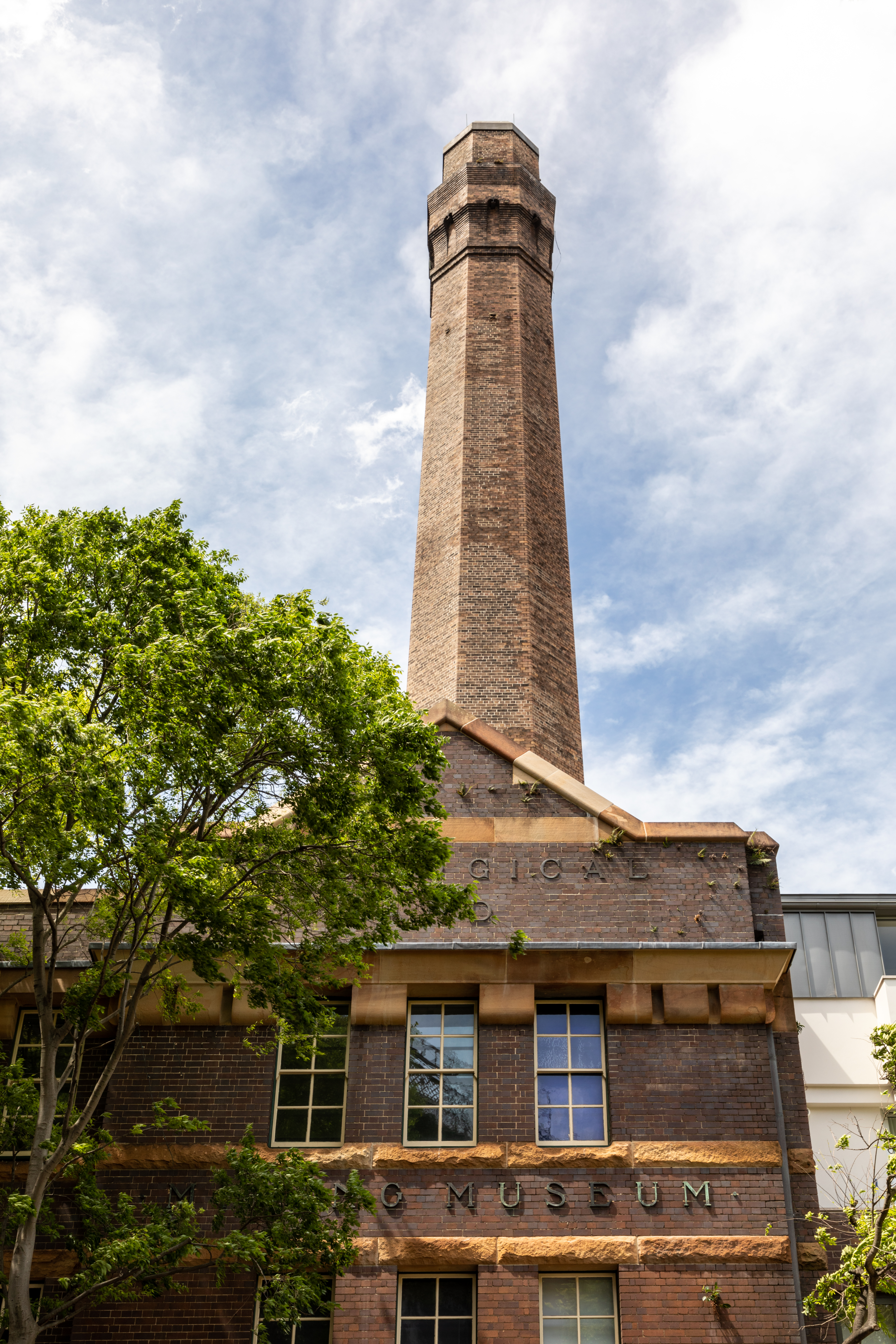
Chimney of George St Electric Light Station.

PWD's first attempt to construct a major power station was the George Street Electric Light Station in The Rocks, erected on behalf of Sydney Harbour Trust. That organisation operated three smaller power stations, in Sydney, for lighting wharf areas, which were situated at Napoleon St, Circular Quay, and on the Cowper Wharf Road at Woolloomooloo.

A single-storey building was constructed, together with a tall brick chimney. Intended to generate direct current, it was under-designed for the task, and no equipment was ever installed there. The need for it was superseded by the decision of the City Council to build Pyrmont power station. Fortunately, Government Architect, Walter Liberty Vernon, was able to extend and adapt the empty and roofless powerhouse building, as a Mining Museum, but its never used octagonal chimney stack—a Sydney landmark—still stands as a reminder of the failed power station. Two later purposes that the chimney has had were as an elevated location for early panoramic photography and, later, to support a neon sign advertising Metters domestic appliances.

PWD thereafter had no electricity generation infrastructure in the Sydney region, although its supply network would, in time, reach as close to Sydney as Camden and the Illawarra.

=== Port Kembla thermal power station and its network ===
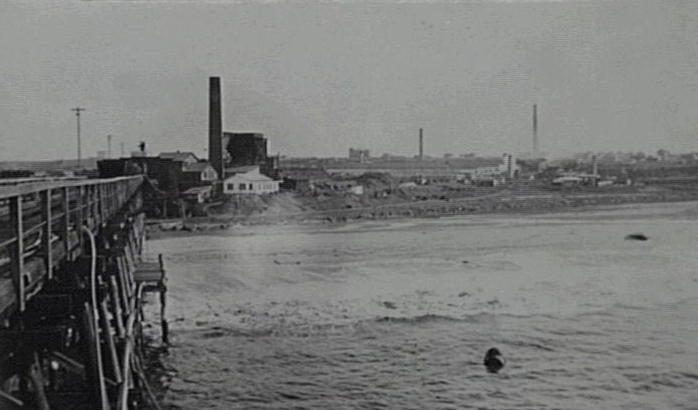
Port Kembla power station, viewed from No.1 Coal Jetty, in 1919. (RAHS)

Erection of the No.1 coal jetty, at Port Kembla, with its electrically powered coal handling equipment, necessitated the construction of the coal-fired Port Kembla power station, which opened in 1915. Capable of generating an excess of electricity, it was soon also supplying nearby industries and towns with electricity. In 1919, an agreement was made to supply Wollongong, and supply of bulk electricity commenced in 1921. An agreement was also reached with the Central Illawarra council covering areas such as Dapto.

In 1925, PWD received approval for a new transmission line from Port Kembla to towns further south (Gerringong, Berry and Nowra) an initiative referred to as the South Coast Electricity Supply Scheme. Expansion of the Port Kembla power station and a number of new transmission lines to surrounding districts were authorised, under the Public Works (Port Kembla Electricity) Act, in April 1929. It authorised new lines that expanded the Port Kembla system to Jervis Bay, and the Southern Highlands and Picton.

By 1935, various municipalities of the Southern Highlands, were taking bulk electrical power from Port Kembla, and the name Southern Electrical Supply was sometimes being used, informally, to describe the network feeding that area.

=== Northern Illawarra and colliery power stations ===
In the northern part of the Illawarra, North Illawarra municipality (Fairy Meadow to Bellambi) and Bulli Shire (Woonona to Helensburgh) had electricity undertakings that were supplied with electricity by local collieries, at various times including South Bulli Colliery, Corrimal-Balgownie Colliery, Corrimal Coke Works, Bellambi Colliery, and the Metropolitan Colliery. The earlier of these arrangements predated the opening of the Port Kembla power station, but continued into the 1940s. The North Bulli Colliery at Coledale also had a powerhouse—generating up to both 200 kW of 250 V d.c. and 500 kVA of 2200 V 60 Hz a.c—but it does not seem to have supplied consumers.

When the two local government areas amalgamated, with Wollongong and the Shire of Central Illawarra, to become the City of Greater Wollongong, in 1947, their power supply arrangements changed, to a single county council covering Greater Wollongong and Shellharbour (lllawarra County Council), the combined network of which was already partially supplied from the Port Kembla power station. In addition, at least as late as 1951, the collieries—Corrimal Coal and Coke, South Bulli colliery (Bellambi Coal Co.), and Metropolitan Coal Company—were still supplying bulk electricity to the council network at 6.6 kV. However, by then, the collieries were no longer able to meet the rising demand.

=== Burrinjuck hydro-power station and connection to Canberra ===
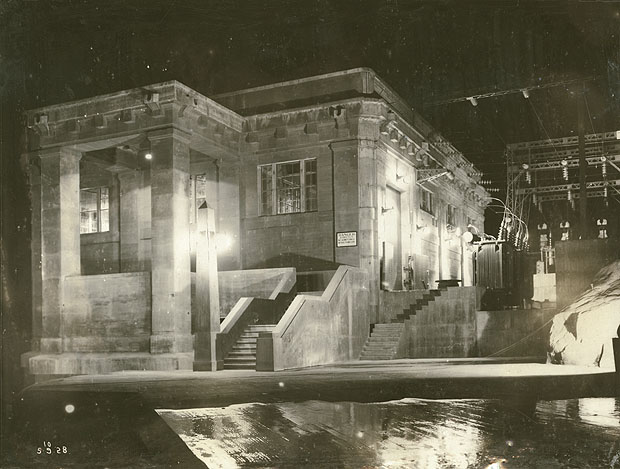
Burrinjuck Dam powerhouse.

PWD constructed the large Burrinjuck Dam on the Murrumbidgee River, which included a hydro-electric power station that opened in 1928. An attractive aspect of Burrinjuck's hydro-electricity was its low cost of production; it could be sold profitably at a rate lower than that generated with coal as the fuel.

Burrinjuck was soon supplying electrical power to a number of surrounding towns. From May 1922, Wagga Wagga had its own power station, using equipment that it had bought second-hand during the sell off of equipment from the Great Cobar mine, but in March 1928, it switched over to a supply from Burrinjuck power station.

Burrinjuck was also connected the growing national capital Canberra, which also had its own coal-fired Kingston powerhouse. The powerhouse at Kingston, although owned by the Commonwealth of Australia, became in effect a part of the transmission network associated with Burrinjuck. The arrangement was formalised by the Burrinjuck Hydro-Electric (Canberra Agreement) Act, in May 1929.

Goulburn was connected to the network, via Canberra, in 1938, but initially also retained its own municipal powerhouse, which remained in due to difficulties obtaining sufficient power from Burrininjuck. Goulburn only phased out its old direct current system in late 1940.

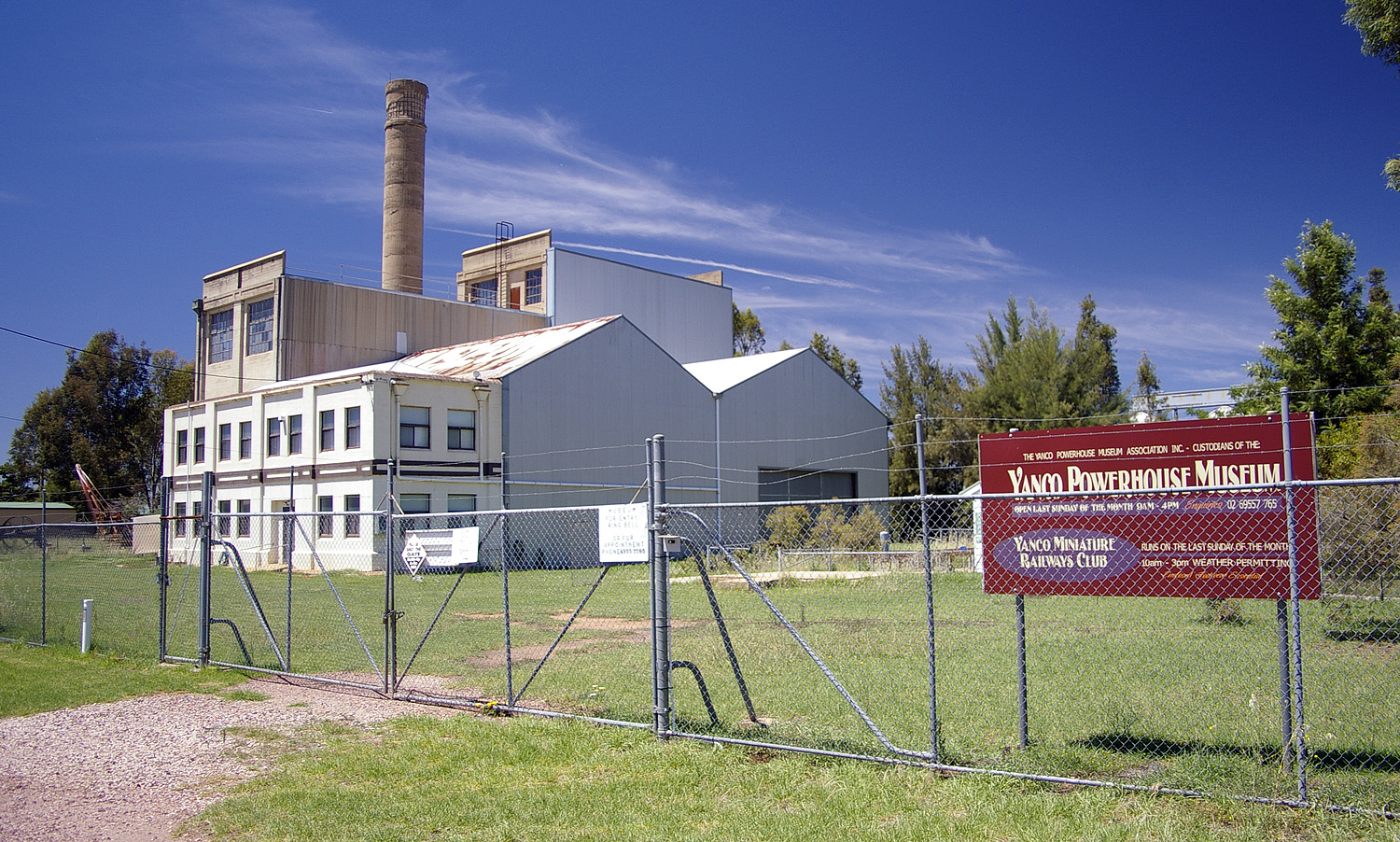
The old Yanco power station (2008)

=== Yanco and the Murrumbidgee Irrigation Area ===
The water stored in the Burrunjuck Dam was destined for the newly irrigated farmlands of the Murrumbidgee Irrigation Area. The denser settlement pattern of irrigated land led to the establishment of new irrigation-based towns, such as Leeton and Griffith, which were remote from other sources of electrical power. PWD built a coal-fired power station at Yanco to service the new settlements and existing ones in the area.

From Yanco, PWD built an isolated network, with main transmission lines, running west to Griffith and east to Narrandera.

=== Wyangala and Cowra ===
PWD completed the Wyangala Dam on the Lachlan River in 1935, and added a hydro-electric power station that opened in April 1947.

Flows in the Lachlan are less regular than in the Murrumbidgee—generally falling off during winter—and PWD built a coal-fired power station, in the nearby town of Cowra, to complement the hydro-power from Wyangala and to meet generally rising demand. The Cowra power station was built inside a building that had previously been a wartime power alcohol plant. PWD reused the low-pressure boiler already there, with second-hand low-pressure turbo-alternators bought from BHP Whyalla. It opened in 1948.

=== Other power sources ===
Some large industrial enterprises in the Illawarra region also generated their own electricity. Two of these, Corrimal Cokeworks and Australian Iron & Steel, at times exported power to other consumers, via the SES transmission network.

== Growth of transmission network and founding of SES ==
It was not until 1940 that the PWD network centred on Port Kembla was connected to that centred on Burrinjuck, by a new 236 km long 132 kV line connecting Port Kembla to Goulburn. The combined PWD network was thereafter referred to as the Southern Electrical Supply.

Administration and control of these combined assets was given to the Administrator of the Southern Electricity Supply of New South Wales, a corporation sole, by the enactment of the Southern Electricity (Administration) Act, 1942 No. 3, in May 1942. The Administrator was nominated in the Act as being the Minister for Public Works, but the minister could delegate powers, authorities, duties and functions to a public servant.

By 1944, Southern Electrical Supply (SES) controlled a main system centred on Port Kembla and Burrinjuck—connected to Canberra, Wagga Wagga and Cowra—but not at that stage the PWD's separate isolated network associated with the irrigation area.

The main SES system supplied bulk power to many towns in the south and south central west of New South Wales. By 1944, its power lines connected the South Coast from Wollongong to Jervis Bay, the Highlands, from Camden to Goulburn, the south to Canberra, the mining town of Captains Flat, Wagga Wagga, Junee, Cootamundra. Murrumburrah, Temora, and Young, and the Central West to Grenfell, Cowra, and Canowindra.

In late 1945, the previously isolated network covering the towns of the extensive Murrumbidgee Irrigation Area was connected to the main SES system, by a new 66 kV transmission line running between Wagga Wagga and Yanco, via Narrandera. In 1947, the new Wyangala hydro-power station was added to the network and, in 1948, the coal-fired power station at Cowra. In implementing such a widespread network, SES had developed a considerable expertise in long-distance power transmission at high voltages.

During 1949/1950, SES was responsible for the construction of a power transmission line from Cooma to Canberra, as part of the Snowy Mountains Scheme. Until that line was extended from Cooma to Jindabyne, to Adaminaby, to Tumut Pond, and to 'M.1.B' (Guthega Power Station), SES provided diesel-powered generation at construction sites.

== Relationship with other electricity utilities and interconnection ==
The NSW Department of Railways generated power for trams and electric trains in Sydney (at Ultimo and White Bay) and supplied bulk electricity to some southern and western parts of the Sydney metropolitan area. It also operated power stations outside the Sydney metropolitan area, in Newcastle and at Lithgow. All railway power stations were coal fired.

After legislation was passed, in 1941, an interconnection was made, via a new SES transmission line, between Port Kembla Power Station and the Department of Railways substation at Sydenham, in Sydney. Since 1925, the Railway's 50 Hz system at White Bay Power Station had been interconnected with that of Sydney County Council (SCC), operator of Pyrmont and Bunnerong power stations. From 1939, a frequency changer at White Bay connected the Department of Railway's 25 Hz system in Sydney to its 50 Hz system. In 1941, an interconnection was made between SCC and Electric Light and Power Supply Corporation, the privately owned operator of Balmain Power Station. For the first time, by 1942, the four major power generators in New South Wales were connected to each other.

The Department of Railway's transmission lines, from Lithgow, extended as far as Wellington and passed through Orange, only around 90 km from the closest point of the SES network, at Cowra. Around 1947, a second interconnection, at 66kV, was made, between the network of Southern Electrical Supply (with power coming from Cowra) and NSW Department of Railways (with power coming from Lithgow via Bathurst) at Orange.

These interconnectors would prove valuable, during the electricity supply crises of the post-war period, when Southern Electricity Supply was able to transmit urgently needed electricity to Sydney using these links, from as far away as Yanco.

However, despite the interconnections made during 1941 and 1942, there were still numerous isolated power systems serving regional cities and towns, and many rural areas still had no mains electricity. Some of these isolated systems, like the one serving Tamworth and the one serving the Northern Rivers, were relatively extensive networks, but others just served individual regional towns without any wider transmission network. The Department of Works and Local Government, as distinct from Southern Electricity Supply, had a role in overseeing franchises providing these electricity supplies. By the early 1950s, these isolated systems were struggling to meet demand and it was apparent that a new approach was needed.

== Merger creating the Electricity Commission of New South Wales. ==
New South Wales had four large electricity generating entities—together accounting for 93% of electricity generated in New South Wales—each supplying different geographical areas of the state. Critically, there was no single entity responsible for planning and implementation of all new generating and power transmission capacity, in New South Wales, at a time when a major expansion would inevitably occur, due to rapidly growing demand and the need to extend the network further. That was a very different arrangement to the apparently successful State Electricity Commission of Victoria; it was established in 1919 and, by 1949, controlled virtually all electricity generation in Victoria. New South Wales Government policy of the immediate post-war period was to create a single government-owned monopoly to control electricity generation within the state, along broadly similar lines to what had been achieved in Victoria.

The passing of the Electricity Commission Act in 1950, authorised the merging of the four largest electricity generators in New South Wales, including SES, under the newly formed Electricity Commission of New South Wales (ECNSW). Vivian J. F. Brain (1896—1957), a former Chief Electrical Engineer of PWD and chairman of the State Electricity Authority, was appointed as a commissioner and vice-chairman of ECNSW.

ECNSW took over the electricity assets and operations of the Southern Electrical Supply, in November 1950. Around the time of the merger, SES was planning an expansion of Port Kembla power station and had started work on a new power station, Tallawarra, which was completed under the ECNSW.

The merger was not well received by local government areas supplied by the old Southern Electricity Supply, at least initially, The change resulted in an increase to the charges for bulk electricity, which were passed onto consumers. However, the ECNSW also addressed long-standing issues; the lack of capacity planning, insufficient allowance for asset depreciation, fluctuating pricing depending upon the availability of relatively-cheaper hydro-electricity, greater interconnection and coordination, the need to rapidly expand generating capacity in response to rapidly rising demand, and funding of the new works.

By the time that the ECNSW was broken up and subsequently privatised, the former Southern Electricity Supply was largely forgotten.
