= Electric Light and Power Supply Corporation =

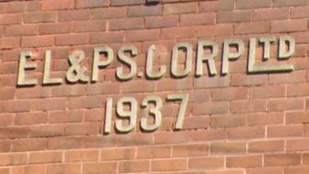
Signage on substation in Mort Street, Balmain, NSW.

Electric Light and Power Supply Corporation Limited was a listed company that generated and distributed electrical power to suburbs within the Inner West of Sydney, New South Wales Australia, from 1909 to 1956. It owned and operated the Balmain Power Station. It was nationalised in 1956, by the New South Wales Government, and its assets and operations became a part of the Electricity Commission of New South Wales, on 1 January 1957.

== Origins ==
The Borough of Balmain Electric Lighting Act 1906 enabled the local council to generate electricity for the surrounding area and to incinerate its garbage. This right was contracted to a private company set up for that purpose.

The company (EL&PSC) was set up in 1908. In line with the 1906 Act of Parliament, its original purpose was both to supply electricity to the Borough of Balmain and to incinerate its garbage.

On 30 September 1909, the newly completed power station (later known as Balmain 'A') generated its first electricity, partially fuelled by garbage and partially by coal. The power station was located on waterfront land, adjacent to the Iron Cove Bridge, and with a wharf where coal could be unloaded. It had a coal stockpile adjacent to the power station, which gave some resilience against coal strikes and other interruptions to the coal supply.

== Company, shares, and capital raising ==
Electric Light and Power Supply Corporation Limited was a publicly listed company, with shares traded on the stock exchange. In 1908, it issued 100,000 shares of £1 each. In 1914, the capital of the company was increased to £300,000, by the issue of another 200,000 shares, of £1 each.

In 1954, as nationalisation approached, there were 886,291 ordinary and 166,667 cumulative 7% preference shares, making up capital of £1,052,858.

== Other private electric utility companies ==
EL&PSC would not be the only privately owned electricity supplier in the Sydney region. Founded in 1913, Parramatta Electric Supply Company—reconstructed in 1921 and, after 1929, known as Parramatta and Granville Electric Supply Company (P&GESC)—supplied customers further west, initially from its own power station in Macquarie Street, Parramatta. From 1906 to 1920, the suburb of Manly, was supplied first by Manly Electric Light Company and then, from 1911, by Manly Electric Supply Company, with direct current electricity, from a small coal-fired power station there. The generators of the huge meat cold store of the Pastoral Finance Association (PFA), at Kirribilli, also supplied electricity—almost certainly direct current—to some customers on the north side of the harbour, from January 1909 until 1922, through a subsidiary company, Northern Sydney Electric Light and Power Supply Corporation. It also provided street lighting for some of the major streets of North Sydney from 1913 to 1922. However, PFA failed in its objective to set up a larger power station (and garbage incinerator) to supply all the municipalities on the Lower North Shore, with alternating current electricity. In the south of Sydney, a small number of consumers were supplied from two small privately owned power stations; one at Brighton-le-Sands run by Saywell's Tramway & Estates Limited, from 1900 until 1923, and one at Cronulla, run by a Mr Robinson until 1925.

Within the City of Sydney, there were various small privately owned electricity suppliers that were set up prior to the municipal electrical utility beginning power generation. Strand Electric Lighting Company, had a power station in George Street behind the Royal Hotel, and another in Elizabeth Street. Empire Electric Light Company, had its power station adjacent to the Empire Hotel in Pitt St, and opened a second in Margaret Lane. Other small suppliers were Arcadia, George Adams, and the 'Oxford Company' (on Oxford Street). These small suppliers were set up originally to supply their own buildings, but also supplied others on a small scale; all were still in operation in August 1903.

By the mid-1920s, the only remaining privately owned electric utilities in the Sydney region were EL&PSC and P&GESC.

== Growth, constraints, and relationship with other utility organisations ==
By around the same time as the EL&PSC was beginning its operations, the Municipal Council of Sydney's electrical supply undertaking (SMC), also known as the 'City Council' or 'Sydney Municipal Council'—owner and operator of the Pyrmont Power Station, opened in July 1904—had bought out the two largest of the small private power suppliers within its municipal boundaries, Strand and Empire. SMC was soon extending its service beyond its own municipal boundaries. Such an extension required the agreement of the relevant local government authorities, although the other municipality sometimes facilitated such an agreement itself, in order to secure an electricity supply and electric street lighting. The first such extension was to supply the Women's Hospital at Paddington, and subsequently the rest of the small Municipality of Paddington. In 1910, SMC had signed agreements with Annandale, Mascot, Randwick, and Woollahra municipalities. SMC and EL&PSC were seen to be competing to extend their distribution networks into neighbouring municipalities.

By December 1910, EL&PSC had only 225 consumers in Balmain, and another 76 in Newtown. By the end of 1911, the area that was exclusively serviced by EL&PSC comprised not only the municipality of Balmain, but also the neighbouring municipalities of Newtown, Petersham, Leichhardt, and Ashfield. EL&PSC owned and operated the expanding network low-voltage reticulation and street lighting, within these municipalities. In August 1912, there were 1,036 consumers, rising to 4,056 by the end of 1916, as its electricity mains were extended and more consumers could be connected. By June 1920, its supply was connected to 31,200 premises and it had 215 miles of lit streets, but its area of coverage had not expanded. In contrast, around 1921–1922, SMC started to supply consumers and light streets in parts of the Lower North Shore—it already supplied Willoughby from April 1916—and also reached agreement to supply bulk electricity to Manly. In 1930, SMC obtained agreement to supply bulk power to several municipalities extending as far west as Penrith. Sydney County Council (SCC) was created, in 1935, taking over SMC's electrical operations. EL&PSC's service area was, by then, effectively surrounded by sixteen municipalities that had agreed to take their power from the rival SCC, constraining further growth of EL&PSC.

Both SMC and EL&PSC were displacing the hitherto dominant gas lamps, for both street and house lighting, in the areas that they supplied with electricity. The cost of lighting streets with electric lamps was reportedly less than half of that using gas lamps. The change affected the two gas utility companies, Australian Gas Light Company (AGL) and North Shore Gas Company. In 1912, the chairman of AGL was quoted as saying that, "It was only a question of time, ... when these councils would find out their mistake to have effected the change [from gas street lighting to electric]". However, gas street lamps were soon disappearing from the streets of Sydney's suburbs.

During the early 1930s, EL&PSC erected a number of substation buildings in the Inner West. As its area of operations had not expanded, the new substations probably indicate that EL&PSC was increasing the amount of electricity that it was supplying to its customers there, most likely displacing gas usage. Gas could be used for cooking, space heating, water heating, and gas-powered refrigerators, instead of electricity, but was no longer a viable alternative for lighting. Gas was widely connected to premises in the Inner West. EL&PSC applied separate 'light' and 'power' tariffs. Probably, the lower rate for 'power' was to remain competitive with reticulated town gas, supplied by EL&PSC's well-established rival, Australian Gas Light Company.

Parts of Balmain and Birchgrove were industrial areas. EL&PSC supplied electrical power to Mort's Dock and Balmain Colliery, among other industrial customers. Mort's Dock could also generate its own power. The Cockatoo Island Dockyard, just offshore from the Balmain Power Station, had its own powerhouse to generate electricity for the docks.

Even more so after the opening of Bunnerong Power Station, in 1929, SCC was a much larger utility than EL&PSC. From 1936 onward, there were proposals and attempts to merge the two entities. An obstacle to such a merger was the apparent profitability of EL&PSC, which gave the company no compelling reason to sell its business to SCC cheaply. By 1943, although the profitability of EL&PSC had declined, the attempts to merge had clearly failed.

The third large power generator in the Sydney region was New South Wales Government Railways (NSWGR), after 1932, NSW Department of Railways. It generated power for electric trams, and from 1926, electric trains, at Ultimo (from 1899) and White Bay (from 1913). NSWGR was also a supplier of bulk electrical power to some municipalities in metropolitan Sydney, typically those further away from the city centre and to the south. Two of NSWGR's major bulk supply customers were, from 1921, St George County Council and, from 1925, Sutherland Shire. Outside the Sydney metropolitan area, NSWGR's operations included coal-fired power stations at Lithgow (from 1928) and Newcastle (from 1915), which were initially the centres of two separate networks, neither of which were connected to NSWGR's network in Sydney. Connection of these three networks to create a single NSWGR network was achieved only by 1941–1942.

== Interconnections ==
By the mid-1920s, SMC's Pyrmont Power Station had no further room for capacity expansion, but demand for electricity continued to rise. In April 1923, SMC reached an agreement, with the Railway Commissioners, for NSWGR to provide, from White Bay, the additional power that it needed. The agreement covered the period from 1924 to 1928 or 1929, pending completion of SMC's Bunnerong Power Station. In 1925, a 50 Hz interconnection was made between the two systems. However, it was not until 1939 that the commissioning of a frequency changer, at White Bay, allowed those NSWGR generators working at 25 Hz to supply the, by then, Sydney County Council (SCC) at 50 Hz, something that had been advocated as early as 1919.

Concern about the possibility of a wartime attack on a power station, which could leave parts of Sydney without power, resulted in the installation of an interconnection to link SCC and EL&PSC (Balmain Power Station) networks, in 1941. After that, all the power distribution networks in the Sydney metropolitan area were interconnected.

There were also two interconnections to the NSWGR network from the Southern Electricity Supply (SES), at Sydenham in Sydney (to Port Kembla) from around 1941, and at Orange (to Cowra) from 1947. SES supplied southern and southern central-western parts of the state, from its own coal-fired and hydro-electric power stations. By 1942, all four major electricity generators in New South Wales were interconnected in some manner.

== Technology ==
=== Consumer reticulation ===
A major difference between the two power supply entities, SMC and EL&PSC, was that EL&PSC always supplied its street lighting and consumers' mains with alternating current, using three-phase transformers to step down the voltage for low-voltage 50 Hz alternating current reticulation at 415 / 240 Volts. SMC supplied street lighting and consumers' mains with direct current, from rotary converter substations at the Town Hall and at Lang Park, where high-voltage alternating current from Pyrmont was converted to low-voltage direct current for reticulation. There were five substations in and close to the Sydney CBD area, included in the 1904 plan, but the last three used transformers to provide low voltage alternating current. The City Council's street lighting and customers, in areas bordering the CBD, were supplied with alternating current (415 / 240 Volts, 50 Hz) but the CBD area was supplied with direct current (480 / 240 Volts). An advantage of direct current was that, from 1909, the Town Hall substation had a large battery that could augment the supply to customers. Direct current was also more easily applied to building elevators (lifts), at least in those early years. By the end of 1913, SMC had 63 substations and 20 pole-mounted transformers. In 1929, SMC opened a large modern power station, Bunnerong, and it adopted low-voltage alternating current reticulation as its standard for all new installations, in 1930. However, by then, the direct current system was well established; SMC had by then five direct current substations in the CBD, and it needed to relocate its Lang Park substation to Dalley Street, during the construction of Sydney Harbour Bridge. By the time SCC was created, in 1935, direct current reticulation was almost technologically obsolete, but it was to take many years, extending well into the 1950s, and much expense to progressively convert all of SCC's remaining d.c. supply mains to alternating current. The last of SCC's direct current customers, the General Post Office—supplied via a mercury-arc rectifier—was only disconnected on 28 August 1985.

=== Lighting ===
Probably conscious of the amount of electricity consumed in its street lighting network—power that could not be sold to customers—EL&PSC was a relatively earlier adopter of newer and more efficient lighting technology; it used tungsten filament incandescent lamps, from 1909, and mercury vapour lamps, from the mid-1930s.

=== Consumer metering and charges ===
A customer's bill from 1932, shows that EL&PSC had separate electricity meters for lighting and power. There were two different charging rates applied, with that for 'power' being very significantly cheaper than that for 'lighting'.

== Post-war expansion ==
In the years following the Second World War, there was a rapid rise in demand for electricity. Insufficient generating capacity resulted in increasingly frequent black outs, exacerbated by strikes at power stations and the 1949 coal industry strikes, a cumulative lack of non-essential maintenance during wartime, breakdowns and lengthy repairs of critical items of equipment, and an inability to procure new capital equipment due the longer-term impacts of wartime restrictions on industry and the disruption of international trade.

EL&PSC was better able to continue the supply to its customers during this period, and the problems mainly affected the areas supplied by SCC. These interruptions of power supply had political implications for the New South Wales Government, but also presented an opportunity for EL&PSC to expand its business.

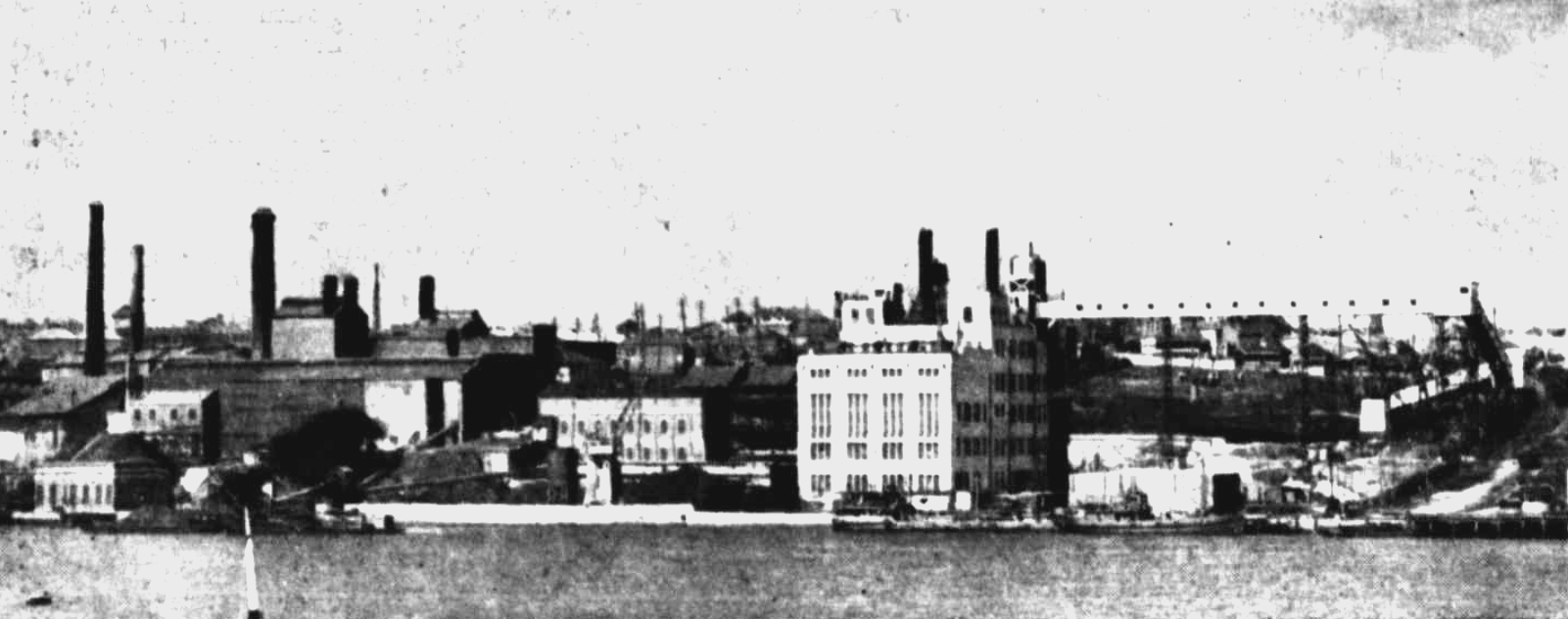
Balmain 'A' Power Station (centre-left), with Balmain 'B' under construction (centre-right), 1947. The coal wharf lies in front of the power station.

EL&PSC invested in a major expansion of the Balmain Power Station, adding a modern new plant (Balmain 'B'), to increase the total capacity of Balmain. Provision was made to allow Balmain 'B' to be expanded, on both sides, in future, with the ultimate planned capacity being 300 MW. It began operating in 1950.

During the late 1940s, EL&PSC attempted to become the bulk power supplier to Parramatta and Granville Electric Supply Company Limited (P&GESC). No longer generating its own power, P&GESC was obtaining bulk electricity from Department of Railways power stations (such as White Bay), not Balmain. In 1948, the EL&PSC made a takeover offer for P&GESC and, by 1950, it owned all but 419 of its 150,000 shares. With new capacity at Balmain, the company began supplying power to P&GESC and even to SCC, which had its own power stations, Pyrmont and Bunnerong.

== Government policy and nationalisation ==
After the Second World War, it was recognised that the number and small size of the municipalities in New South Wales, were constraints on developing necessary infrastructure. In 1949, under the Local Government (Areas) Act 1948, mergers of municipalities took place, creating larger entities, some of which were partially-supplied by EL&PSC and partially-supplied by SCC.

New South Wales had four large electricity generating entities—together generating 93% of electricity in New South Wales—only one of which, EL&PSC, was privately owned. Critically, there was no single entity responsible for planning and implementation of all new generating and power transmission capacity, in New South Wales, at a time when a major expansion would inevitably occur. That was a very different arrangement to the apparently successful State Electricity Commission of Victoria; it was established in 1919 and, by 1949, controlled virtually all electricity generation in Victoria. New South Wales Government policy of the immediate post-war period was to create a single government-owned monopoly to control electricity generation within the state, along broadly similar lines to what had been achieved in Victoria, but with retailing of electricity and street lighting under municipal control.

The Government's plan, to nationalise EL&PSC and its subsidiary company, Parramatta and Granville Electric Supply Company Limited, was announced in 1950. In November 1950, the Electricity Commission (Balmain Electric Light Company Purchase) Act was enacted. However, there was resistance to the acquisition of the company, from its management and shareholders and from opposition politicians. A significant obstacle was reaching agreement on a method to be applied when valuing the company's assets—book value, market value, or replacement cost—because different methods produced very different valuations. The immediate reaction on the stock market was to bid up the value of EL&PSC shares, after the EL&PSC board advised its shareholders not to sell their shares, during the period of negotiation with the government. There were protracted negotiations, ending in a dispute over the sale price, which delayed the nationalisation.

In May 1949, Harold Conde (1898–1959)—employed by EL&PSC since 1929 and its General Manager since 1938—became the 'Emergency Power Commissioner', and in this position he managed the statewide electricity supply, during the crises of the 1949 coal industry strikes and the underlying shortages of generating capacity. Conde had previously held the wartime role of Deputy Regional Controller of Electricity Supply in New South Wales. In May 1950, he was appointed head of the newly established Electricity Commission of New South Wales (ECNSW). Conde's appointment was intended to deal with the frequent blackouts of the period and, almost certainly, was influenced by the better performance of EL&PSC in expanding generating capacity and maintaining a reliable supply, relative to SCC. The minister to whom he answered, Joseph (J.J) Cahill, was particularly aggrieved at delays to a major expansion of capacity, SCC's Pyrmont 'B' Power Station, and Cahill lost confidence in SCC's management. As the head of ECNSW, Conde oversaw the subsequent reorganisation and expansion of electricity generation and transmission during the 1950s. By 1955, the available generating capacity had caught up with demand for electricity, and the electricity crisis and its blackouts were at an end.

The dispute over the valuation of the assets of the EL&PSC eventually reached the High Court. It was not until 1956 that EL&PSC finally was nationalised, and its generation and distribution assets were transferred to the Electricity Commission of New South Wales, on 1 January 1957. Sydney County Council—from January 1952, only a distributor of electricity—took over the electricity distribution and street lighting operations of the old company, and 41,244 consumers, in the Inner West of Sydney, from 1 January 1958. The newly created Prospect County Council took over the distribution and street lighting operations of the subsidiary, Parramatta and Granville Electric Supply Company Limited, from 1 July 1958.

Balmain Power Station was expanded further, while owned by ECNSW, but finally closed in 1976.

== Remnants ==
The old pumphouse building is all that remains at the old site of the Balmain Power Station. In November 2023, there were old substations and other buildings that bear the company's name, in the Inner West suburbs of Sydney; some have been repurposed, and some may be the work of a leading Sydney architect of the time, E. Lindsay Thompson. Efforts to have some substation buildings added to the heritage list of Inner West Council stalled, in June 2023, after YIMBY movement agitation against their listing. Despite their small land plots making them unsuitable for multiple occupancy housing redevelopment, the substations had become emblematic in the broader argument over what kinds of buildings and how much of the area should be heritage protected.

Documents relating to EL&PSC are held in the State Archive of New South Wales collection. A consumer's electricity bill from the old company, dating from 1932, is included in the collection of the Powerhouse Museum.
