= List of coal-fired power stations in Australia =

These fossil fuel power stations burn coal to power steam turbines that generate some or all of the electricity they produce. Australia's fleet of coal-fired power stations is aging and many are due for decommissioning, and are being replaced by a combination of mostly renewable energy. In early 2017, 75% of the coal-fired power stations in the country were operating beyond their original design life.

The declining cost of renewable energy sources, such as solar power, wind power and battery storage, means it is unlikely a new coal-fired power station will ever be built in Australia, which would make the 2009-commissioned Bluewaters Power Station the last coal-fired power station to be constructed in Australia. The Liddell Power Station is the latest coal-fired power station to be decommissioned, which took place on 28 April 2023.

Total projected maximum energy capacity (MW) from coal-fired power stations in Australia^{By Dec 31 of year, based on closure years listed below}
_{22260} / _{22260} / _{19380} / _{17200} / _{16406} / _{16406} / _{16406} / _{16406} / _{12446} / _{12446} / _{8566} / _{8566} / _{6723} / _{6723} / _{6723} / _{5323}; 2025 / 2026 / 2027 / 2028 / 2029 / 2030 / 2031 / 2032 / 2033 / 2034 / 2035 / 2036 / 2037 / 2038 / 2039 / 2040	Total: 214240: New South Wales; Queensland; Victoria; Western Australia

== New South Wales ==
Power station	Commission year	Scheduled closure year	Max. capacity (MW)	CO_{2} emissions (t CO_{2}-e/year)	Emission intensity (t CO_{2}-e/MWh)	Turbines	Coal type	Conveyance	Mine type	Cooling water	Owner
Bayswater	1982	2033	2,640	13,725,965	0.88	4	bituminous	conveyors, rail	open cut	fresh	AGL
Eraring	1982	2029 (Note: Prior to 2022, Unit 4 was scheduled to close in 2030, unit 1 scheduled to close in 2031, units 2 and 3 scheduled to close in 2032.)	2,880	14,914,916	0.87	4	bituminous	rail, truck	underground	salt	Origin
Mt Piper	1993	2040	1,400	6,841,302	0.87	2	bituminous	road, conveyor	underground	fresh	EnergyAustralia
Vales Point B	1978	2033	1,320	7,015,626	0.86	2	bituminous	conveyors	underground	salt	Delta

Total (MW): 8,240

=== Decommissioned stations ===
Power station	Commission year(s)	Closure year	Max. capacity (MW)	Emission intensity (t CO_{2}-e/MWh)	Turbines	Coal type	Conveyance	Mine type	Cooling water	Former owner
Liddell	1971-1973	2023	2,000	0.94	4	bituminous	conveyors, rail	open cut	fresh	
Munmorah	1969	2012	1,400	1.16	4	bituminous				
Redbank	2001	2014	151	1.4	1	bituminous				
Wallerawang A	1957-1959	1986	120		4	bituminous			fresh	
Wallerawang B	1961	1990	120		2	bituminous			fresh	
Wallerawang C	1976-1980	2014	1000	1.05	2	bituminous			fresh	
White Bay A	1917-1925	1955	58.5		5	bituminous				
White Bay B	1926-1928	1975	86		4	bituminous				
White Bay C	1951-1958	1983	100		2	bituminous				
Pyrmont A	1904-1924	1950s	75		7	bituminous				
Pyrmont B	1952-1955	1983	200		4	bituminous				
Ultimo	1899-1951	1963	79.5		11	bituminous				
Bunnerong A	1926-1937	1975	175		7	bituminous				
Bunnerong B	1939-1947	1975	200		4	bituminous				
Tallawarra A	1954-1955	1989	120		4	bituminous				
Tallawarra B	1960	1989	200		2	bituminous				
Balmain A	1909-1935	1976	41		9	bituminous				
Balmain B	1940-1956	1976	84.4		4	bituminous				

== Queensland ==
Power station	Commission year	Scheduled closure year	Max. capacity (MW)	CO_{2} emissions (t CO_{2}-e/year)	Emission intensity (t CO_{2}-e/MWh)	Turbines	Coal type	Conveyance	Mine type	Cooling water	Owner	Refs
Callide B	1989	2028	700	5,103,540	0.92	2	bituminous	conveyor	open cut	fresh	CS Energy, Intergen	
Callide C	2001	Not Announced	810	5,265,665	0.9	2	bituminous	conveyor	open cut	fresh	CS Energy, Intergen	
Gladstone	1976	2035, potential early closure in 2029	1,680	8,547,021	0.95	6	bituminous	rail	open cut	seawater	Rio Tinto, NRG	
Kogan Creek	2007	2042	750	4,360,686	0.83	1	bituminous	conveyor	open cut	dry cooled	CS Energy	
Millmerran	2002	2051	852	5,794,351	0.82	2	bituminous	conveyor	open cut	dry cooled	Intergen	
Stanwell	1993	2046	1,445	7,637,735	0.87	4	bituminous	rail	open cut	fresh	Stanwell	
Tarong	1984	2037	1,400	10,473,950	0.86	4	bituminous	conveyor	open cut	fresh	Stanwell	
Tarong North	2002	2037	443	10,473,950	0.86	1	bituminous	conveyor	open cut	fresh	Stanwell	

Total (MW): 8,080

Decommissioned stations

== Victoria ==
Power station	Commission year	Scheduled closure year	Max. capacity (MW)	CO_{2} emissions (t CO_{2}-e/year)	Emission intensity (t CO_{2}-e/MWh)	Turbines	Coal type	Conveyance	Mine type	Cooling water	Owner
Loy Yang A	1984	2035	2200	20,107,115	1.17	4	lignite	conveyors	open cut	fresh cooling tower	AGL
Loy Yang B	1993	2047 (Note: The expected closure will be influenced by Victoria's legislated renewable energy target of 95% by 2035, as the target would not be reached if Loy Yang B continues to operate past 2035.)	1050	10,132,776	1.14	2	lignite	conveyors	open cut	fresh cooling tower	Chow Tai Fook, Alinta Energy
Yallourn Power Station	1975	2028	1480	13,856,313	1.34	4	lignite	conveyors	open cut	fresh cooling tower	EnergyAustralia

Total (MW): 4,730

Decommissioned stations

List of Decommissioned power stations in Victoria

== Western Australia ==
Power station	Commission year	Scheduled closure year	Max. capacity (MW)	CO_{2} emissions (t CO_{2}-e/year)	Emission intensity (t CO_{2}-e/MWh)	Turbines	Coal type	Conveyance	Mine type	Cooling water	Owner
Collie	1999	2027	340	1,848,693	0.91	1	bituminous	conveyor	open cut	fresh	Synergy
Muja	1981	(units 1–6 closed) 2029 (Units 7 & 8)	654	3,982,663	0.9	4	bituminous	conveyor	open cut	fresh	Synergy
Bluewaters	2009	–	416	2,966,541	0.88	2	bituminous	conveyor	open cut	fresh	Sumitomo Group, Kansai Electric

Total (MW): 1,410

- Kwinana A (240 MW) was shut down in 2010, and Kwinana C (400 MW) was shut down in 2015.

Decommissioned stations

== Other states/territories ==
=== Australian Capital Territory ===
The Australian Capital Territory does not use coal or oil to generate electricity. The Kingston Powerhouse was the last coal-fired power station in the territory, but was decommissioned in 1957.

Decommissioned stations

=== Northern Territory ===
The Northern Territory relies predominantly on natural gas, as well as various renewable energy sources. Likewise, it has no functioning coal-fired power stations.

Decommissioned stations

=== South Australia ===
South Australia previously had a number of coal power stations. The last to be closed were the Northern and Playford B power stations.

Decommissioned stations

=== Tasmania ===
Tasmania has no functioning coal-fired power stations, instead using primarily hydroelectricity, with natural gas used as a backup.

Decommissioned stations

== See also ==
- 100% renewable energy
- Energy policy of Australia
- List of natural gas fired power stations in Australia

== Sources ==
- Boom and Bust 2021: Tracking The Global Coal Plant Pipeline (Report). Global Energy Monitor. 5 April 2021.
