= Pacific Power (Australia) =

Pacific Power was the state owned monopoly power generator in the state of New South Wales, Australia. The corporation was formed from the New South Wales Electricity Commission in 1995. It was broken up into TransGrid, Delta Electricity, Eraring Energy and Macquarie Generation in between 1995 and 2003. The consultancy division, Pacific Power International was acquired by Connell Wagner at the same time.

== Electricity Commission of New South Wales ==
The Electricity Commission of New South Wales, sometimes called Elcom, was a statutory body responsible for the generation of electricity and its bulk transmission throughout New South Wales, Australia. The commission was established on 22 May 1950 by the Electricity Commission Act 1950 and its role was to take over power generation responsibility from the County Councils (such as the Sydney County Council) and the railways, who until that time were responsible for power generation and distribution. It acquired the power stations and main transmission lines of the four major supply authorities (Southern Electricity Supply, Sydney County Council, the Department of Railways and the Electric Light and Power Supply Corporation Ltd, known as the Balmain Company). The commission was responsible for the centralised co-ordination of the states electricity generation and supply.

Between 1950 and 1960 the commission more than trebled power capacity, from 490 megawatts to 1800. At first, this involved completing the expansions of Bunnerong, White Bay, Balmain, and Pyrmont, and completing new stations already designed by the Department of Railways: Tallawarra near Port Kembla (1954), Wangi, at Lake Macquarie (1956), and Wallerawang, near Lithgow (1957).

== Electricity Commission of New South Wales Trading as Pacific Power ==
The Electricity Commission adopted the trading name Pacific Power in 1992.

== Pacific Power ==
The corporation was formed from the New South Wales Electricity Commission in 1995.

In the early 1990s, Australian state governments began to deregulate state owned monopoly electricity commissions in order to promote competition, customer choice and potentially cheaper electricity. In 1995, the transmission assets were split off into a new organisation called Transgrid. In 1996, two new entities were split off - Delta Electricity and Macquarie Generation. In 2000, the remaining power stations were transferred to a new entity, Eraring Energy, and the consulting business sold to Connell Wagner.

Pacific Power was then closed in 2003.
