= Electricity Commission of New South Wales =

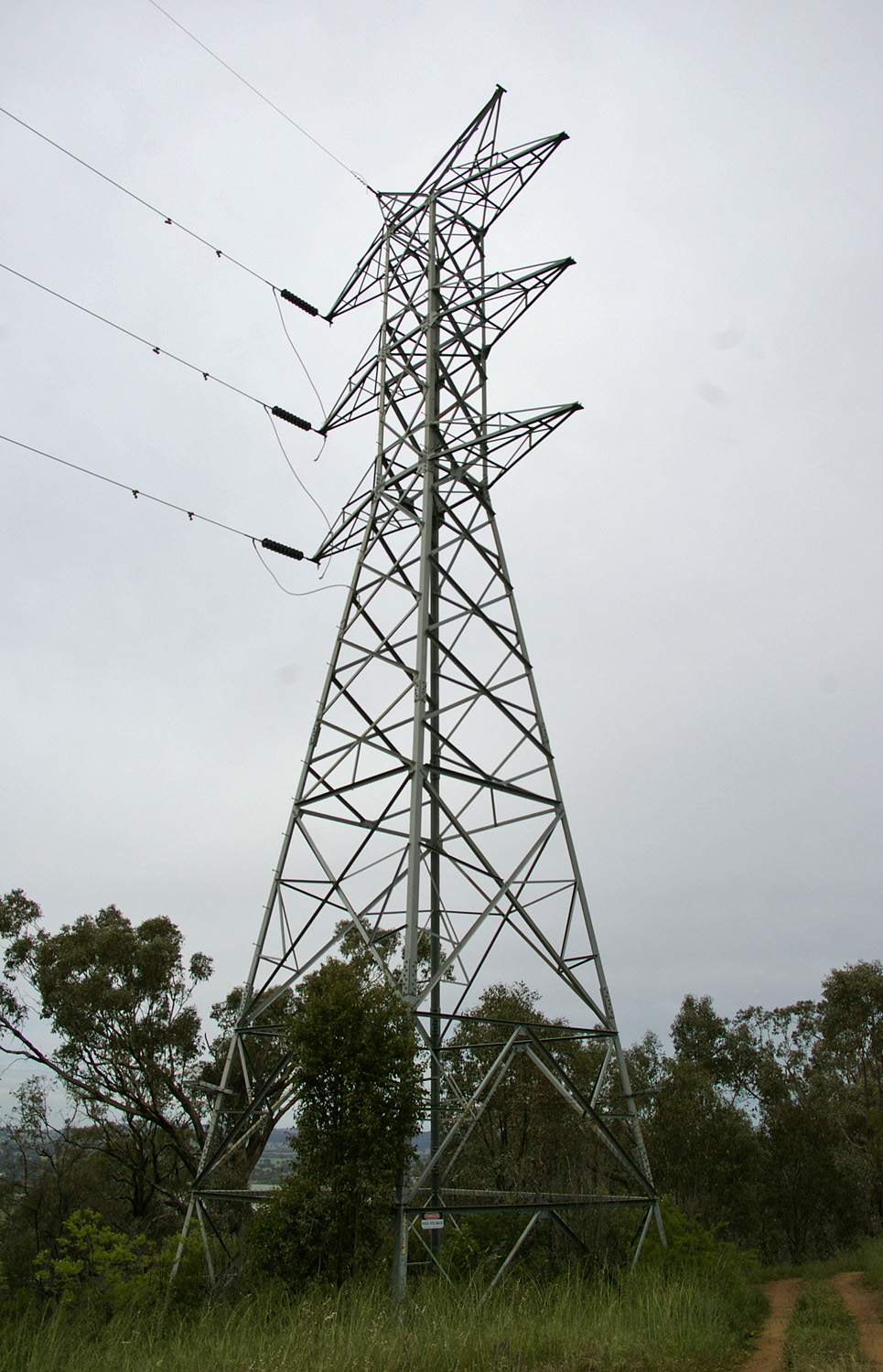
A disused ELCOM transmission tower

The Electricity Commission of New South Wales, sometimes called Elcom, was a statutory authority responsible for electricity generation and its bulk transmission throughout New South Wales, Australia. The commission was established on 22 May 1950 by the Electricity Commission Act 1950 to take control of power generation in the State. The commission acquired the power stations and main transmission lines of the four major supply authorities: Southern Electricity Supply, Sydney County Council, the Department of Railways and the Electric Light and Power Supply Corporation Ltd, also known as the Balmain Electric Light Company, the owner and operator of Balmain Power Station. The commission was responsible for the centralised co-ordination of electricity generation and transmission in the State, and some local councils continued to be distributors of electricity only.

== History ==
=== Formation and expansion ===
The Electricity Commission of New South Wales was formed in 1950 to take over and manage electricity generation across the state, as part of the post-war reconstruction. Until then, power generation and distribution in the state involved a variety of authorities, the four major ones being Southern Electricity Supply, Sydney County Council (SCC), the New South Wales Government Railways (NSWGR), and the Electric Light and Power Supply Corporation Ltd, known as the Balmain Electric Light Company. Between 1936 and 1952, Sydney County Council was responsible for electricity generation and distribution in the City of Sydney, and operated the Bunnerong and Pyrmont Power Stations until they were transferred to the Electricity Commission in 1952. In 1953, the commission acquired the White Bay Power Station from the NSWGR. Under the Balmain Electric Light Company Purchase Act 1950, the commission acquired the company's Balmain Power Station, although a lengthy dispute over asset valuation delayed the takeover of the Balmain assets until 1956.

From 1947, Sydney County Council had plans to erect a coal-fired power station, on the Georges River, at 'Lugarno', but the site was actually on the southern side of the river, opposite Lugarno. The site had been in line with the SCC's prior practice of placing generation close to consumers, but there was local opposition to the proposal. Once the Commission was formed, it took control of the Lugarno power station project, which was effectively abandoned when it was deferred in November 1950.

The Commission adopted the practice of siting its new power stations near coal mines and using large transmission lines to feed centres of population, which had already begun to be implemented by the Department of Railways and Southern Electricity Supply. The tenders received for the Lugarno power station were reused as the basis of Wallerawang 'A' power station.

Between 1950 and 1960, the Commission more than tripled power capacity in the State, from 490 to 1800 megawatts. At first, this involved completing the expansion of Bunnerong, White Bay, Balmain, and Pyrmont power stations, and constructing new power stations already designed by the NSWGR: Tallawarra near Port Kembla (1954), Wangi, at Lake Macquarie (1956), and Wallerawang, near Lithgow (1957).

=== Founding Commissioners ===
In May 1949, Harold Conde (1898–1959)—employed by Electric Light & Power Supply Corporation (EL&PSC) since 1929 and its General Manager since 1938—was appointed head of the newly established Electricity Commission of New South Wales (ECNSW). Conde's appointment was intended to deal with the frequent blackouts of the period and, almost certainly, was influenced by the better performance of EL&PSC in expanding generating capacity and maintaining a reliable supply, relative to Sydney County Council (SCC). The minister to whom he answered, Joseph (J.J) Cahill, was particularly aggrieved at delays to a major expansion of capacity, SCC's Pyrmont 'B' Power Station, and Cahill lost confidence in SCC's management. As the chairman of the Commission, Conde oversaw the subsequent reorganisation and expansion of electricity generation and transmission during the 1950s. By 1955, the available generating capacity had caught up with demand for electricity, and the electricity crisis and its blackouts were at an end.

Vivian J. F. Brain (1896—1957), a former Chief Electrical Engineer of the Public Works Department and chairman of the State Electricity Authority, was appointed as a commissioner and vice-chairman of Commission.

=== Distribution restructure ===
After the takeover of the generation functions by the Electricity Commission, the SCC and other municipal county councils became distributors of electricity only. The Prospect County Council was formed in 1957, as a spin-off from the Sydney County Council, also taking over the electricity distribution assets of a privately-owned utility, Parramatta and Granville Electricity Supply Company.

In the early 1990s, eastern state governments prepared for the National Electricity Market and electricity deregulation. In 1989, the state government formed Sydney Electricity, to take control of electricity distribution from Sydney municipal councils. Prospect County Council became Prospect Electricity in 1991, and was responsible for retailing electricity to consumers in the Greater Western Sydney region and was controlled by local councils in the area. In 1996, Sydney Electricity was merged with Orion Energy to form EnergyAustralia. In 1996, Prospect Electricity was merged with Illawarra Electricity to form Integral Energy. Country Energy was formed on 1 July 2001 with the merger of New South Wales rural-based energy retailers, Great Southern Energy, Advance Energy and Northpower.

On 14 December 2010 Kristina Keneally Labor government sold the state's electricity retailing assets for A$5.3 billion. The sales were as follows:

- Origin Energy bought Integral Energy, the retail division of Country Energy (including the Country Energy brand), and electricity trading rights for Eraring Energy, for $3.25 billion. The remainder of Country Energy was re-branded as Essential Energy on 1 March 2011. Integral Energy and Country Energy continue to trade as subsidiaries of Origin Energy.
- Hong-Kong listed TRUenergy bought the retail business of the government entity EnergyAustralia including its name, the right to trade the output generated by Delta Electricity power stations west of Sydney, as well as three development sites including one at the Mount Piper Extension near Lithgow and two at Marulan, for $2.035 billion. TRUenergy was also to provide an additional $240 million for capital improvements at the Wallerawang power station. Subsequently, on 2 March 2011, the government changed the name of the remainder of the government-controlled EnergyAustralia to Ausgrid, and TRUenergy in 2012 changed its name to EnergyAustralia.

=== Breakup and reform ===
In the early 1990s, Australian state governments began to deregulate state owned monopoly electricity commissions in order to promote competition, customer choice and potentially cheaper electricity. The Commission adopted the trading name Pacific Power in 1992. The Electricity Commission was corporatised in 1995 as Pacific Power (Australia).

In 1992, the coal mines owned and operated by Pacific Power were split off into a new government organanisation called ELCOM Collieries or Powercoal. In 2002, Centennial Coal acquired Powercoal for $306 million, to become the largest independent supplier of coal for power generation in the state. Centennial Coal was acquired by Thailand-based Banpu in July 2010 for US$2 billion, and Powercoal continues as a subsidiary of Centennial Coal. Currently, Centennial operates five coal mines and exports approximately 40% of its coal. The balance supplies fuel to approximately 40% of the State's coal-fired electricity.

In 1995, the high voltage electricity transmission network was split off into a new government organisation called TransGrid.

The Terranora interconnector (also known as Directlink), commissioned in 2000 to link the New South Wales and Queensland power grids, was a joint venture of NorthPower (later Country Energy), TransÉnergie – a subsidiary of Hydro-Québec, and Fonds de solidarité FTQ. A second link, the Queensland – New South Wales Interconnector, commissioned in 2002, is operated by TransGrid and Powerlink Queensland. In 2007, Australian Pipeline Trust (a part of APA Group) acquired Directlink for US$133 million. In December 2008, ownership of Directlink (as well as Murraylink) was transferred to the Energy Infrastructure Investments Group, while the APA Group continued as the operator. The ownership of EII is APA with 19.9%, with the balance with Japan-based Marubeni Corporation with 49.9% and Osaka Gas with 30.2%.

In 1996, two new electricity generating entities were split off - Delta Electricity and Macquarie Generation. In 2000, the remaining power stations were transferred to a new entity, Eraring Energy, and the consulting business Pacific Power International was sold to Connell Wagner.

Pacific Power was wound up in 2003.

=== Privatisation ===
The privatisation of the State's electricity assets proposed in 1997 began a long running controversy which extended into the 21st century.

On 14 December 2010, Kristina Keneally's Labor government sold the first tranche of the partial privatisation of the state's electricity assets for $5.3 billion.

In January 2011, eight of the directors of the Delta Electricity resigned in protest over the proposed sale of trading rights to the output of generators. After criticism of the privatisation plans, the Government abandoned further electricity privatisation. Also, there were no bidders. The Keneally Labor government was soundly defeated at the 2011 state election held on 26 March, suffering an overall swing of over 16%

In May 2012, the O'Farrell Liberal government passed legislation to sell the State-owned generators. In July 2013, EnergyAustralia acquired, from Delta Electricity, Wallerawang and Mount Piper Power Stations for A$160 million. In November 2014, EnergyAustralia announced that it would permanently close Wallerawang due to ongoing reduced energy demand, lack of access to competitively priced coal and the power station's high operating costs. In September 2014, the government sold Macquarie Generation to AGL Energy for $1,505 million, including the Bayswater and Liddell Power Stations. In April 2015, AGL announced that it intended to close the Liddell Power Station in 2022. The remaining asset of Delta Electricity, the Vales Point Power Station (which has a maximum capacity of 1,320 megawatts (1,770,000 hp)), was sold in November 2015 to Sunset Power International for $1 million.

During the 2015 state election the Mike Baird Liberal government campaigned on a controversial plan to lease 49% of the state-owned electricity distribution network (known as the "poles and wires") for 99 years. The government's plan involved the lease of 100% of high-voltage distributor TransGrid and majority stakes in Ausgrid and Endeavour Energy, which together cover local distribution in metropolitan NSW. Country-based Essential Energy was not part of the proposal. Labor, supported by the state's union movement, ran on an anti-privatisation platform. The plan enjoyed significant support, including from business groups seeking lower electricity prices, such as the Energy Users' Association, the Business Council and the Australian Industry Group; and by transport lobby groups Infrastructure Partnerships Australia and the Tourism and Transport Forum. In addition, a number of senior Labor figures came out in support, including former Prime Minister Paul Keating, former NSW Treasurer Michael Costa, and former federal Resources Minister Martin Ferguson. Following the election, former Labor Premiers Bob Carr and Morris Iemma and former Labor Treasurer Michael Egan added their voices in support. Full privatisation of poles and wires also had the support of Australia's Productivity Commission. The plan was opposed by Labor, the Greens, the Shooters & Fishers and a number of unions. The plan also polled poorly and attracted little support on the ABC's Vote Compass site.

In December 2015, a consortium called NSW Electricity Networks won a 99-year lease of TransGrid's transmission network for $10.3 billion. In October 2016, Australian-based IFM Investors and AustralianSuper acquired 50.4% interest in a 99-year lease of Ausgrid for $16 billion. In June 2017, an Australian-led consortium of institutional investors acquired 50.4% ownership of the rights to management Endeavour Energy's network assets under a 99-year lease. The consortium is led by Macquarie Infrastructure and Real Assets (MIRA), and includes AMP Capital, British Columbia Investment Management Corporation and Qatar Investment Authority.
