= Pacific Power =

Pacific Power may refer to:

- Pacific Power, an electric power company in the north-western United States owned by PacifiCorp
- Pacific Power (Australia), a state owned power generation company in the state of New South Wales, Australia which operated from 1995 to 2003
