= Transgrid =

Transmission system operator in Australia

- Predecessor: Electricity Commission of New South Wales
- Founded: 1 February 1995
- Headquarters: Sydney, Australia
- Area served: New South Wales, Australian Capital Territory
- Services: Electric power transmission
- Owners: Caisse de dépôt et placement du Québec (22.505%); Tawreed Investments (19.99%); OMERS (19.99%); Utilities Trust of Australia (22.505%); Spark Infrastructure (15.01%)
- Website: www.transgrid.com.au

Transgrid is the manager and operator of the high voltage electricity transmission network in New South Wales and the Australian Capital Territory, Australia, and is part of the National Electricity Market (NEM). The company's offices are located in Sydney, Newcastle, Orange, Tamworth, Wagga Wagga, and Yass.

== History ==
Transgrid began as the trading name of the Electricity Transmission Authority which was established on 1 February 1995 as a statutory authority under the Electricity Transmission Authority Act 1994, as part of the break-up of the Electricity Commission of New South Wales. The Authority was corporatised in December 1998, by the Energy Services Corporations Amendment (Transgrid Corporatisation) Act 1998, and Transgrid became the actual name of the corporation.

In December 2015, a consortium called NSW Electricity Networks was the successful bidder for a 99-year lease of Transgrid's transmission network for $10.3 billion. The consortium consists of two Australian entities–Spark Infrastructure (15%), the Utilities Trust of Australia fund (20%)– together with the Canadian pension fund Caisse de depot et placement du Quebec (25%) and two Middle Eastern sovereign wealth funds–the Abu Dhabi Investment Authority (20%) and the Kuwait Investment Authority (20%). State Grid Corporation of China was one of the other bidders, in a consortium with Macquarie Infrastructure Real Assets. State Grid's bid was cleared by the Foreign Investment Review Board but was eventually unsuccessful, possibly because of its government and military connections.

In 2018, Transgrid was among 17 energy businesses that supported the launch of the Energy Charter, a global initiative aimed at bringing together all parts of the power supply chain to give customers more affordable and reliable energy.

In 2020, OMERS acquired a 19.99% stake in Transgrid from Wren House Infrastructure Management, which is part of the state-owned Kuwait Investment Authority.

As of 2022, the current owners are:

- UTA Power Networks Trust, of which Utilities Trust of Australia is the substantial majority unit holder (22.505%)
- Spark Infrastructure (15.01%)
- Tawreed Investments (19.99%)
- Caisse de depot et placement du Quebec (22.505%)
- OMERS (19.99%)

== Network ==
Transgrid operates the major high voltage electricity transmission network in NSW and the ACT, and is part of the National Electricity Market (NEM). The network connects generators, distributors and major end users. Transgrid's network comprises 104 bulk supply substations and more than 13,133 kilometres of high voltage transmission lines and cables. The network operates primarily at voltage levels of 500 kV, 330 kV, 220 kV and 132 kV.

Transgrid's network also connects to 20 direct connect customers, including the four distribution businesses: Endeavour Energy, Ausgrid, Evoenergy, and Essential Energy.

Transgrid participates in the Australian Energy Regulator's (AER) revenue proposal process, where submissions of the transmission network service providers (TNSP), the AER and other interested parties are used to set the maximum allowable revenue (MAR) for the TNSPs for a five-year period.

== Transgrid Telecommunications ==
With more than 15 years of experience, Transgrid Telecommunications manages a fibre optic network covering in excess of 4000 km across NSW, the ACT and Victoria.

Transgrid's Telecommunications network is one of the largest optical fibre network in Australia, with the majority of the network's Optical Ground Wire (OPGW) strung above the electricity transmission network.

== Key Executives ==
- Brett Redman – Chief Executive Officer
- Nadine Lennie – Chief Financial Officer
- Craig Stallan - Executive General Manager - Lumea
- Jennifer Hughes - Executive General Manager - Delivery
- Jason Krstanoski – Executive General Manager - Network
- Gordon Taylor – Executive General Manager - Major Projects
- Maryanne Graham – Executive General Manager - Stakeholder, Regulatory and Corporate Affairs
- Michael Drew – Executive General Manager - Corporate
- Stephen McSweeney - Executive General Manager – People & Culture
