= Lithgow power station =

- Country: Australia
- Status: Decommissioned
- Commission date: 1928
- Decommission date: 1964

Lithgow power station was an Australian power station built in 1928 to supply power to the New South Wales Government Railways, the small arms factory, Hoskins mine and Lithgow council. The initial plant was two 2.5 MW BTH/English Electric turbo alternators that were no longer needed at Ultimo power station. A third 2.5 MW turbo alternator from Zaara Street, Newcastle was added in 1931. A fourth 2.5MWBTH machine was installed in 1936 (ex Zaara St). In 1943 a 2.5 MW Willans & Robinson generator from Zaara St became No5 at Lithgow. Steam was supplied from four 160,000 lb/Hr boilers at 200PSI and a temp of 450degF. Coal came from the nearby State Mine. Due to a severe lack of water, these turbines only exhausted into individual jet condensers.

The second stage of Lithgow power station development started in 1948 with the removal of No5 which had been damaged and the installation of a 7.5 MW Metro-Vickers alternator from Zaara St and became No4A. Similar 7.5 MW Metro Vickers generators replaced the 2.5 MW machines in 1950, 1953 and 1956 to become No. 3A, No. 5, No. 2 and No. 1. Steam was supplied from five 70,000 lb/hr boilers that were ex White Bay "A" station. A series of wooden cooling towers were constructed and allowed the use of surface condensers for these larger sets. Make-up for the cooling towers came from a new dam built at the adjacent State Mine. Total output was 38 MW.

Walter Lockhart Cowen, district electrical superintendent for New South Wales Government Railways, managed the Lithgow Power Station from its construction phase until his retirement in 1951. The station remained in operation until 1964, by which time the nearby Wallerawang Power Station was running. The Lithgow Power Station was demolished during the 1970s.
