= Corporation sole =

Type of legal entity

A corporation sole is a legal entity consisting of a single ("sole") incorporated office, occupied by a single ("sole") natural person. This structure allows corporations (often religious corporations or Commonwealth governments) to pass without interruption from one officeholder to the next, giving positions legal continuity with subsequent officeholders having identical powers and possessions to their predecessors. A corporation sole is one of two types of corporation, the other being a corporation aggregate.

== Ecclesiastical origins ==
Most corporations sole are church-related, although some political offices of the United Kingdom (e.g., many of the secretaries of state), Canada, and the United States are corporations sole.

The Catholic Church continues to use corporations sole in holding titles of property: as recently as 2002, it split a diocese in the US state of California into many smaller corporations sole and with each parish priest becoming his own corporation sole, thus limiting the diocese's liability for any sexual abuse or other wrongful activity in which the priest might engage. This is, however, not the case everywhere, and legal application varies. For instance, other U.S. jurisdictions have used corporations at multiple levels.

The Church of Jesus Christ of Latter-day Saints uses the corporation sole form for its president, which is legally listed as "The Church of Jesus Christ of Latter-day Saints".

Iglesia ni Cristo was registered as corporation sole with the Insular Government of the Philippines in 1914.

== The Crown ==
Within most constitutional monarchies, notably the Commonwealth realms, the Crown is a nonstatutory corporation sole. Although conceptually speaking, the office and officeholder retain dual capacities in that they may act both in a corporate capacity (as monarch) and in an individual capacity (as a private person), they are inseparably fused in law; there is no legal distinction between the office and the individual person who holds it. The Crown (state) legally acts as a person when it enters into contracts and possesses property.

The sovereign's status as a corporation sole ensures that all references to the king, the queen, His Majesty, Her Majesty, and the Crown are synonymous, referring to exactly the same legal personality over time, though the identity is in at least some cases also asserted by statute without reference to the concept of corporation sole. While natural persons who serve as sovereign pass on, the sovereign never legally dies; thus the corporate nature of the office of sovereign ensures that the authority of the state continues uninterrupted. In other words, the sovereign is made a corporation sole to prevent the possibility of disruption or interregnum, thereby preserving the stability of the Crown (state). For this reason, at the moment of the demise of the sovereign, a successor is immediately and automatically in place.

As a corporation sole, the legal person of the sovereign is the personification of the state and consequently acts as a guarantor of the rule of law and the fount of all executive authority behind the state's institutions.

== Secular application in the United States ==
Every state of the United States recognizes corporations sole under common law, and about a third of the states have specific statutes that stipulate the conditions under which that state recognizes the corporations sole that are filed with that state for acquiring, holding, and disposing of title for church and religious society property.

== Examples of corporations sole in the United Kingdom ==
=== Governmental ===
- The Crown (sometimes regarded as a corporation aggregate)
- Administrator of Japanese Property (abolished)
- Auditor General for Wales
- Chief Executive of Skills Funding
- Children's Commissioner for England
- Children's Commissioner for Wales
- Commissioner for Older People for Northern Ireland
- Commissioner of Police of the Metropolis
- Chief Constables of territorial police forces in England and Wales.
- Comptroller and Auditor General
- The Corporate Officer of the House of Commons and the Corporate Officer of the House of Lords, two corporations established by the Parliamentary Corporate Bodies Act 1992
- Duke of Cornwall (inhabited by the Prince of Wales)
- Duke of Lancaster (inhabited by the monarch)
- Information Commissioner
- Mayor's Office for Policing and Crime (London)
- Judicial Appointments and Conduct Ombudsman
- Lord Mayor of London
- Official Custodian for Charities
- Immigration Services Commissioner
- Police Ombudsman for Northern Ireland
- Public Services Ombudsman for Wales
- Public Trustee
- Pubs Code Adjudicator
- Receiver for the Metropolitan Police District (abolished)
- Registrar General
- many secretaries of state in the United Kingdom (various; most recently Foreign, Commonwealth and Development Affairs)
- Solicitor for the affairs of the Duchy of Lancaster
- Treasury Solicitor
- London Fire Commissioner

=== Private entities ===
- Da'i al-Mutlaq

=== In the Church of England ===
- Archbishop of Canterbury
- Archbishop of York
- Bishops of the Church of England
- Deans of the Church of England
- Rectors and Team Rectors in the Church of England
- Vicars in the Church of England

== Examples of corporations sole in New Zealand ==
- Public Trustee (until 2001)
- Māori Trustee
- Privacy Commissioner

== Examples of corporations sole elsewhere ==
- The Diocese of Hong Kong
- The Church of Jesus Christ of Latter-day Saints, in the office of its Presiding Bishop
- Director of National Parks, Australian government
- Governor General of Canada
- Minister of the Government, Republic of Ireland
- Public Trustee
- The Archbishop of Manila
- The Archbishop of New York
- Office of the sovereign of Canada
- The Catholic Bishop of Chicago, A Corporation Sole- The Archdiocese of Chicago
- (Former) Administrator of the Southern Electricity Supply of New South Wales
- Iglesia ni Cristo

== See also ==
- Legal person
