= Partnership (Australia) =

In Australia, each state has enacted legislation regarding partnerships.

Jurisdiction	Relevant Act
ACT	Partnership Act 1963
NSW	Partnership Act 1892
NT	Partnership Act 1997
Qld	Partnership Act 1891
SA	Partnership Act 1891
Tas	Partnership Act 1891
Vic	Partnership Act 1958
WA	Partnership Act 1895

The definition of a partnership does not vary across jurisdictions, with each definition encompassing the following criteria in determining the existence of a partnership:

- Valid agreement between the parties;
- To carry on a business – as opposed to a single or isolated transaction, which suggests a Joint venture.;
- In common – meaning there must be some mutuality of rights, agency, interests and obligations;
- View to profit – partnerships must form with a view to profit. Other business structures such as charities and sporting clubs do not seek to share profits and liabilities, and are thus treated differently under each state jurisdiction's respective Associations Incorporation Act.

== Who is a partner? ==
As to whether any given person involved with a company is a 'partner', guidance is found in s.6 of the Act. Several rules are given. The most common are as follows:

- Joint-ownership:

Rule 1 – s.6(1)provides that there must be joint-ownership. This is rather self-explanatory but the mere fact that persons may be joint-tenants or have part ownership do not in themselves create a partnership. Typically, where the rules below point towards a partnership, such would generally satisfy this rule.

- Participating in gross returns:

Generally speaking, 'partners' must share gross-returns each according to their share in the business. Thus at first instance, if persons share the gross-returns, one would be inclined to say that a partnership exists. However, rule 2- s.6(2) complicates this. It provides that the sharing of gross returns will not in itself create a partnership.

All this notwithstanding, sharing of gross-returns is a strong indication of a partnership – particularly where a set percentage is prescribed in the agreement.

- Sharing of profits:

Rule 3- s 6(3) provides that the sharing of profits is prima facie evidence that a partnership exists. However, this is not categorical. To cite two examples where a person entitled to a share was not a partner is where that such person is a creditor or by virtue of s.6(3)(b) where that 'sharing of profits' is simply remuneration or a wage. Note in the latter example, s.28(6) provides that although partners are not entitled to remuneration – and thus he who receives remuneration is prima facie not a partner – this may be varied by partnership agreement. Therefore, receiving remuneration does not conclusively indicate against a partnership.

- Sharing of losses:

Rule 3 – s6(3) also concerns sharing of profits. Section 28 explains that all partners must contribute equally to firm’s losses.

- Exercise partner’s rights:

Generally, where a person exercises those rights that would typically be exercised by a true partner, the more likely a partnership can be imputed. Section 28 includes a non-exhaustive list of partner’s rights.

The most common partners rights are the right to participate in the firms management (s.28(5)) (which can be illustrated by attending meetings) and the right to access the firm's books and confidential financial reports (s.28(9)). A partner without the right to participate in the firms management is often referred to as a silent partner.

But, at the end of the day there is flexibility in the partnership agreement and it is possible for the partners to consensually agree to exclude one or more of these partner's rights in relation to any given partner. Thus, put simply, the mere fact a person does not exercise these rights does not indicate categorically that they are not a partner.

== Partner's liability ==
Perhaps the most important question for any partner is 'what is my liability under this arrangement'.

In essence, the liability of a partner (or even a non-partner who was 'held out' to be a partner see below) is significantly large. Every partner or person held out to be a partner is both an agent and principal of the firm and may thus bind the firm and the partners: s.9. Simply, each partner is his brother's proverbial keeper and will be responsible both legally and financially for the actions of the other partners in the general course of business.

To give a clear example, where one partner acts negligently and there is no indemnity insurance (or the indemnity insurer refuses to cover the loss), the liability of all partners will be joint and several: s.16. The cause of major distress for partners arises where the other partners become insolvent. The weight of total liability would rest on the solvent partners. Thus put simply, even if a person only had a 25% partner's share, he or she would be responsible for covering all 100% (potentially exorbitantly exceeding their investment) of the damage arising from the negligence if the other partners do not have the means to pay.

As alluded to above, the issue of "holding out", which is discussed in s.18(1) of the Act, is particularly relevant. "Holding out" refers to where a non-partner advertises himself or alternatively is advertised to the world as being a partner. This advertising can be either explicit and/or implicit

For example, where the firm permits a non-partner to 'sign off' on company accounts or documents or where a non-partner has an office next to the partner's or even enjoys the perks of the true partners, these are implicit indication to the world that the non-partner is actually a partner. To exemplify express indications, this would occur where a non-partner has his name on the company letter-head or to go even further, actively introduces himself as a partner.

Not only may the non-partner be held to be liable as a partner, the true partners will also be liable for the non-partners actions just as they would be for the actions of a true partner. This is provided that the relevant third-party was reasonably unaware of the non-partner's true position in the business and the conduct on the non-partner could be described as in the ordinary course of business. These two are generally part and parcel as if the transaction is not in the ordinary course of business, then the less likely it is that a third party would genuinely believe that the non-partner was a partner.

== Limited partnership ==
Limited Partnerships are governed by Part III of the Act. The paramount characteristic of such a partnership is that a limited partner's liability will be limited: See s.49(1) definition.

Section 60(1) indicates that the liability of limited partner limited to amount shown in Register (Register of Limited Partnerships, see s. 57). Typically, a limited partner would make a contribution to the capital or assets of the partnership. An interpretation of s.60(2) suggests that the limited partner's liability would not exceed the contribution made or promised.

Other key points to note are that:

- A limited partner can not take part in the management of the business of the limited partnership: s.67(1). If he or she does so, they will be liable as general partners by virtue of s.67(2).

== Dissolution of a Partnership ==
Dissolution of a partnership occurs when there is a change in the relationship of the partners, as a result of a partner ceasing to be associated or a part of carrying on the business. Situations which can be a catalyst for dissolution are

- Action by partners – taking the form of either the notice of dissolution of a previously indefinite partnership agreement which is given by a partner which is agreed to by the other partners, or when the partners agree to dissolve the partnership after the termination of a single or multiple undertakings. An example of the latter would be the partners' prior agreement an expiration date (though the partners may at will choose to continue the partnership after a pre-agreed expiration date if they so choose). Any such action to dissolve the partnership by partners is a grounds for automatic dissolution.
- Operation of law – the partnership may be dissolved in the event of a partner's death or bankruptcy, so long as the other partner(s) agree to the dissolution. Operation of law is also grounds for automatic dissolution.
- Illegality – a partnership is automatically dissolved when an event renders the purpose of the partnership illegal or against public policy
- By the court – when none of the automatic grounds for dissolution listed above are present, one or more partners may apply for dissolution through a court. Examples include insanity, permanent incapacity, one partner's conduct which a court finds detrimental to the business, wilful or persistent breach of the partnership agreement, or whenever a court finds dissolution of the partnership to be just and equitable.

Where there has been misconduct by a partner, such that the assets of the partnership are at risk of dissipation, then it may be appropriate to appoint a receiver.

== See also ==
- Partnership
