= Integral Energy =

- Type: Private
- Industry: Utility
- Predecessor: Prospect Electricity; Illawarra Electricity
- Founded: 1 October 1995
- Defunct: June 2017
- Successor: Endeavour Energy
- Headquarters: Huntingwood, Australia
- Area served: Mainly Greater Western Sydney & Illawarra regions, New South Wales
- Services: Electricity retail
- Parent: Origin Energy

Integral Energy was the second largest state-owned energy corporation in New South Wales, incorporated under the Energy Services Corporations Act 1995 from a merger between Prospect Electricity and Illawarra Electricity. Integral Energy was involved in electricity retail in addition to owning an electricity distribution network and previously held licences to retail electricity in the contestable markets covered by the NEM (National Electricity Market).

At its height, Integral Energy distributed and retailed electricity and services to 807,000 customers, or 2.1 million people. In addition to electricity retailing, Integral Energy also owned an electricity distribution network spanning 24,500 square kilometres in Greater Western Sydney, the Illawarra, and the Southern Highlands.

In 2011, their network value was estimated at A$2 billion and was made up of 25,000 transmission, zone and distribution substations, 370,000 power poles and 150,000 streetlights bound together by 33,000 kilometres of underground and overground cables. Integral Energy did not have a monopoly on the sale of energy within its distribution area and was in competition with private sector retailers such as AGL and Origin Energy since the introduction of full retail contestability in New South Wales.

The CEO was Vince Graham (formerly of RailCorp), who replaced Richard Powis on 7 April 2008.

Fifteen Integral Energy field service centres operated within their franchise, with staff maintaining the network, repairing faults, responding to emergencies and servicing customers and developers in relation to customer connection and contestable projects. The centres were located in Bowenfels, Glendenning, Hoxton Park, Kandos, Katoomba, Moss Vale, Narellan, Nowra, Parramatta, Penrith, Picton, Shellharbour, Springhill, Ulladulla and South Windsor.

The retail division of the company, along with the Integral Energy brand, was sold by the NSW Government in 2011 to Origin Energy. Integral Energy (Networks) was rebranded to Endeavour Energy as part of the NSW Government reform. In June 2017, an Australian-led consortium of institutional investors acquired 50.4% ownership of the rights to management Endeavour Energy’s network assets under a 99-year lease. The consortium was led by Macquarie Infrastructure & Real Assets and included AMP Capital, British Columbia Investment Management Corporation and Qatar Investment Authority.
