= Zaara Street Power Station =

Former power station in Newcastle, New South Wales

- Location of Zaara Street Power Station
- Country: Australia
- Location: Newcastle East, New South Wales, Australia
- Coordinates: 32°55′31″S 151°47′19″E
- Status: Decommissioned and demolished
- Commission date: 1915
- Decommission date: 1975

Thermal power station
- Primary fuel: Thermal coal

Power generation
- Nameplate capacity: 70.75 MW (94,880 hp)

Zaara Street Power Station is a former coal-fired power station that was situated on Zaara Street, in the city of Newcastle, in New South Wales, Australia. The power station was built to supply power for the New South Wales Government Railways (NSWGR) in 1915, when the first turbo-alternator of 2.5 megawatts (3,400 hp) was commissioned. The installation of additional plant in 1920 led to a generating capacity of 28.5 megawatts (38,200 hp). The station was decommissioned in 1975 and demolished in 1978.

== History ==
In 1920 the Zaara Street Power Station started with a 7.5-megawatt (10,100 hp) Curtis GE turbo-alt (No.2) from White Bay and a 2.5-megawatt (3,400 hp) GE turbo-alt (No.3A) both delivering 6.6kV at 25 Hz (1500rpm). Additional power was needed in 1921 and another 2.5-megawatt (3,400 hp) Vickers-Willans alternator (No.3B) was added. Steam was supplied by 4 Babcock & Wilcox WIF long drum chain grate boilers. Each boiler produced 40,000 pounds per hour (5,000 kg/ks) at 200 pounds per square inch (1,400 kPa) and 580 °F (304 °C).

1922 saw a 2.5-megawatt (3,400 hp) British Thompson Houston 50 Hz (3000rpm) alternator (No.4A) and a 1.5-megawatt (2,000 hp) Parsons alternator (No.1) added. More power was required in 1924 and a 7.5-megawatt (10,100 hp) BTH alternator (No.5) was installed. This was followed in 1928 by another 7.5-megawatt (10,100 hp) BTH alternator (No.6). Terminal voltage for these 50 Hz machines was 11kV. Four extra boilers were installed from 1930 to supply these machines. The last change to the low pressure plant was that the No.1 Parsons 1.5-megawatt (2,000 hp) alternator was removed and in its place a 7.5-megawatt (10,100 hp) Bellis & Morcom alternator (No.1) in 1936.

Surplus capacity in the Railway Commissioner's power grid was sold to municipal councils and other bodies responsible for the supply of electricity to the general public. Zaara Street Power Station was connected to the grid of the Electricity Supply Department of the Newcastle Borough Council in 1917, and supplied much of Newcastle's electricity needs throughout the 1920s. Later known as the Newcastle Electricity Supply Council Administration (NESCA), the Newcastle Borough Council also operated a small power station with two alternators and a capacity of approximately 2.6 megawatts (3,500 hp). Built in the 1890s, 'NESCA' Power Station was situated approximately one mile from Zaara Street, and closed in 1953.

== High pressure plant ==
In 1939 a different approach was taken to supply more power more reliably. The first addition was a 15-megawatt (20,000 hp) Brush-Ljunstrom 50 Hz turbo-alternator (No.4). The next year a 12-megawatt (16,000 hp) Fraser + Chalmers ex-Pyrmont alternator was placed in the No.3 position. Steam was supplied to all the high pressure plant by four Babcock & Wilcox high head boilers. Each boiler produced 155,000 pounds per hour (19,500 kg/ks) at 420 pounds per square inch (2,900 kPa) and 810 °F (432 °C). A 20-megawatt (27,000 hp) British Thomson Houston alternator (No.4) was delivered in 1942 and a 15-megawatt (20,000 hp) Westinghouse alternator (No.5) installed in 1944. The No.5 7.5-megawatt (10,100 hp) machine became the number 7 alternator at this time to avoid confusion. Also, the No.2 7.5-megawatt (10,100 hp) machine was replaced with a slightly larger 8.75-megawatt (11,730 hp) Dick Kerr alternator (No.2), ex-White Bay. This gave Zaara Street a new total output of 70.75 megawatts (94,880 hp).

Control of Zaara Street was transferred from the NSWGR to the Electricity Commission of New South Wales on 1 January 1953. By the 1960s only the new boilers and sets 4, 5 & 7 were still in operation. The ECNSW continued to operate the power station until it was officially closed in 1975.

Zaara Street Power Station was demolished in 1978, and all railway facilities in the vicinity were redeveloped into what is now known as The Foreshore. No traces of the power station have survived on the site.
