= Endeavour Energy =

Australian electrical distribution network operator

- Company type: Partnership
- Industry: Electricity
- Predecessor: Integral Energy
- Founded: 1 March 2011
- Headquarters: Parramatta, New South Wales, Australia
- Area served: Greater Western Sydney, Blue Mountains, Southern Highlands and Illawarra areas of New South Wales
- Services: Electricity distribution
- Owner: Partnership between a consortium led by Macquarie Infrastructure and Real Assets with the NSW Government
- Website: www.endeavourenergy.com.au

Endeavour Energy is the operator of the electrical distribution network for Greater Western Sydney, the Blue Mountains, the Southern Highlands and the Illawarra region of NSW, Australia.

== Background ==
It was formed from the previously state-owned energy retailer/supplier, Integral Energy, when the retail division of the company, along with the Integral Energy brand, was sold by the NSW Government in 2011 to Origin Energy.

In June 2017, an Australian-led consortium of institutional investors acquired 50.4% ownership of the rights to management of Endeavour Energy's network assets under a 99-year lease.

The consortium is led by Macquarie Infrastructure and Real Assets (MIRA), and includes AMP Capital, British Columbia Investment Management Corporation and Qatar Investment Authority.

The NSW Government retains a 49.6% interest and continues to regulate safety and reliability.
