= Tallawarra Power Station =

Natural gas-fired power station in New South Wales, Australia

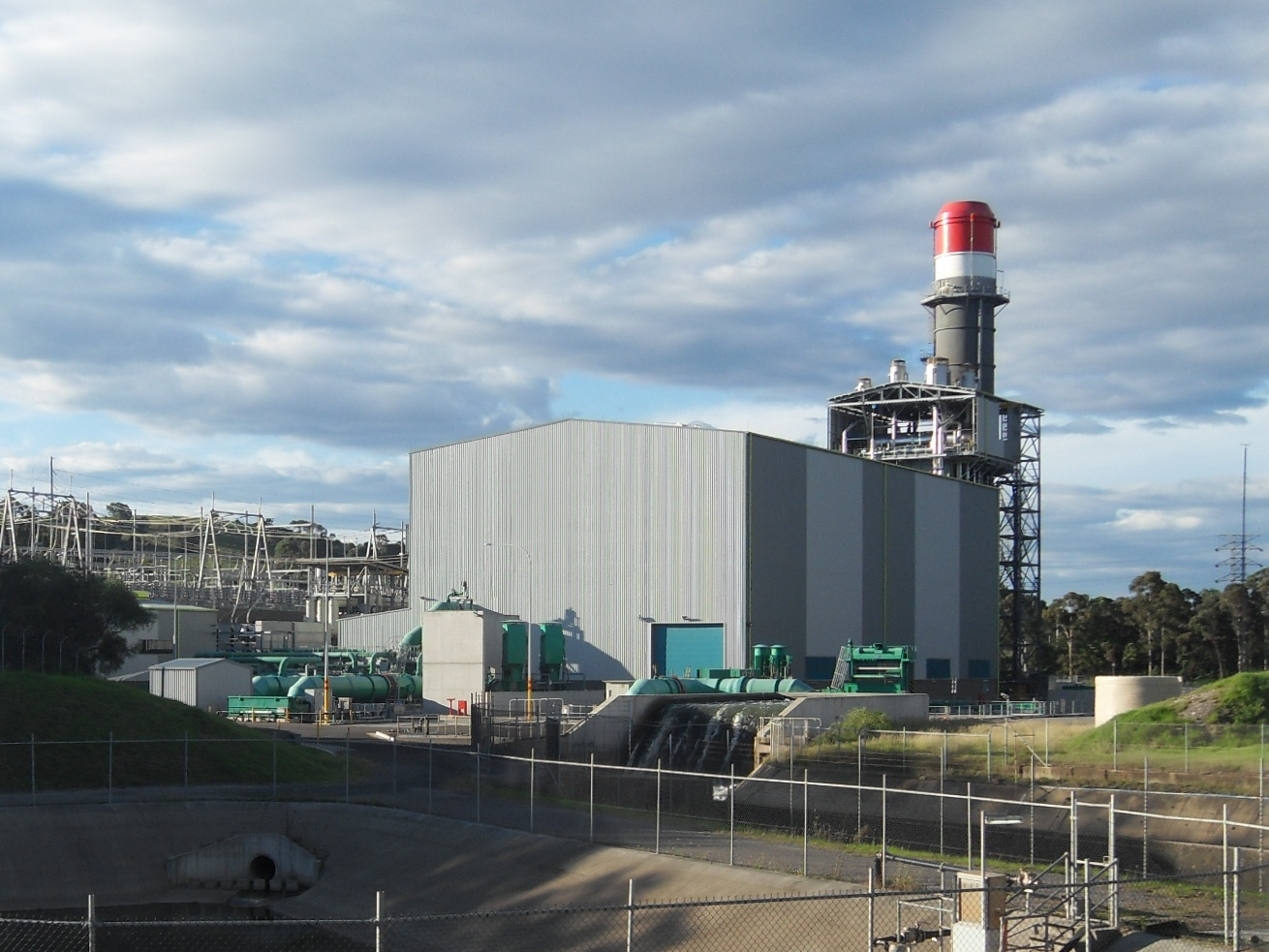
- Country: Australia
- Location: Yallah, New South Wales, Australia
- Coordinates: 34°31′22″S 150°48′29″E
- Status: Operational
- Commission date: 2009
- Owner: EnergyAustralia
- Operator: EnergyAustralia

Thermal power station
- Primary fuel: Natural gas
- Combined cycle?: Yes

Power generation
- Units operational: 1 × 280 megawatts (380,000 hp) GT26 gas turbine; 1 × 160 megawatts (210,000 hp) steam turbine; 1 × 320 megawatts (430,000 hp) gas turbine
- Make and model: Alstom
- Nameplate capacity: 760 megawatts (1,020,000 hp)

External links
- Commons: Related media on Commons

Tallawarra Power Station is a 440-megawatt (590,000 hp) combined cycle natural gas turbine generator and a further 320 MW open cycle gas turbine in Yallah, New South Wales, Australia. Owned and operated by EnergyAustralia, the station is the first of its type in New South Wales and produces electricity for the state during periods of high demand. It is located on the western shore of Lake Illawarra.

The power station comprises a 280-megawatt (380,000 hp) gas turbine and a 160-megawatt (210,000 hp) steam turbine unit and a separate 320 MW gas turbine, and has a total capacity of 760 megawatts (1,020,000 hp). It uses many of the previous power station's structures including the cooling system channels from Lake Illawarra. The power station is connected to the state grid via a 132 kV switching station maintained by Endeavour Energy.

== History ==
Tallawarra originally operated as a coal-fired power station beginning in 1954 and reaching full operation by 1961. At its peak, it had a capacity output of 320 megawatts (430,000 hp). 'A' station had four 30-megawatt (40,000 hp) Thomson-Houston 2 stage (HP+LP) turbo generators. Steam was supplied by four Simon Carves pulverised fuel boilers at 140,000 kg/h (300,000 lb/h) at a pressure of 4.31 MPa (625 psi) and a temperature of 463 °C (865 °F). In 1960 "B" station was built having two 100-megawatt (130,000 hp) English Electric 3-stage turbo generators (No. 5+6). The generators were hydrogen-cooled but didn't have any stator water cooling. Steam was supplied by 2 ICAL pulverised coal burning boilers at a rate of 360,000 kg/h (800,000 lb/h) at a pressure of 11.6 MPa (1,680 psi) and a temperature of 538 °C (1,000 °F). The station closed in 1989, and stood abandoned by the foreshore of Lake Illawarra. It was demolished over a ten-year period.

In early 2003 the site was sold by Pacific Power to TRUenergy and construction of the gas-fired combined cycle plant began in November 2006. The plant consists of a gas turbine of 280 megawatts (380,000 hp) and a 3-stage steam turbine of 160 megawatts (210,000 hp) with a single 500 MVA generator. A unique feature is the Heat Recovery Steam Generator (waste heat boiler) with super heater and reheater sections for the HP, IP and LP stages of the turbine. Overall thermal efficiency is 60%. It was opened by Premier Nathan Rees on 18 March 2009.

In 2021 construction began on Stage B, a $300 million project with a 320 MW Open Cycle Gas Turbine Power Plant. It was commissioned in June 2024.
