= Prospect Electricity =

- Company type: State-owned corporation
- Industry: Electricity
- Predecessor: Prospect County Council
- Founded: 1991
- Defunct: March 1, 1996
- Successor: Integral Energy
- Headquarters: New South Wales, Australia
- Area served: Greater Western Sydney
- Services: Electricity retail
- Owner: Government of New South Wales

Prospect Electricity was the state-owned corporation owned by the Government of New South Wales, Australia, that was responsible for retailing electricity to consumers in the Greater Western Sydney region between 1991 and 1996.

It was founded in 1957 as the Prospect County Council, as a spin-off from the Sydney County Council, which was responsible for supplying electricity to much of the eastern half of Sydney. As with the Sydney County Council, it was controlled by local councils in the area, until 1989 when the state government began to take control of electricity suppliers. Local government control was fully ended in 1991, when Prospect Electricity, a government business enterprise, was formed. On 1 March 1996, Prospect Electricity was merged with Illawarra Electricity to form Integral Energy, in preparation for the National Electricity Market & electricity deregulation.
