= Balmain Power Station =

Former building in Sydney, Australia

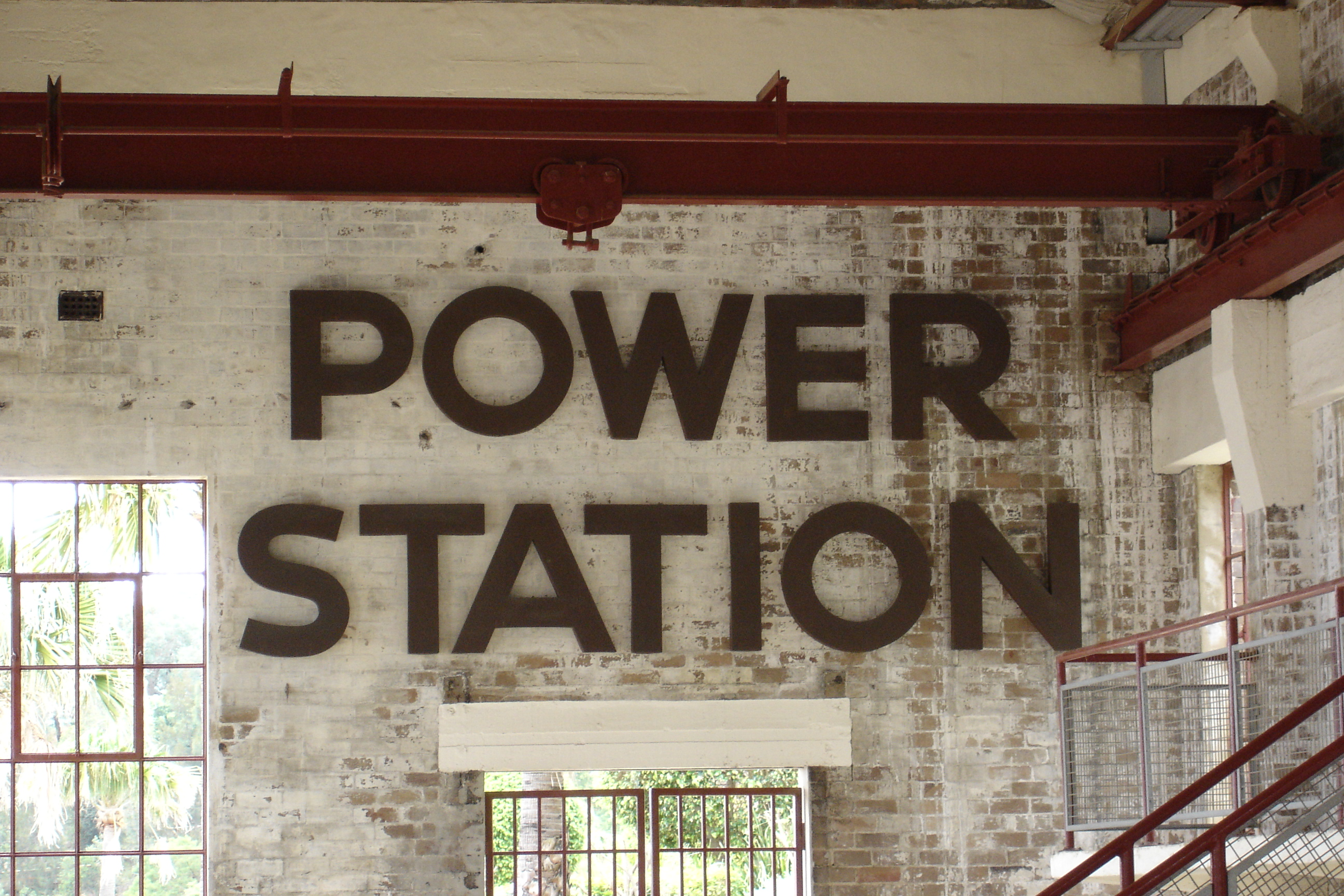
- Salvaged letters from the original building
- Country: Australia
- Location: Iron Cove
- Coordinates: 33°51′35″S 151°09′57″E
- Status: Decommissioned
- Commission date: 1909
- Decommission date: 1976

Thermal power station
- Primary fuel: Coal

Power generation
- Nameplate capacity: 107 MW

The Balmain Power Station was located at Iron Cove, 4 km (2 mi) from Sydney in New South Wales, Australia. The station no longer exists and residential properties now occupy the site. This plant is often confused with the White Bay Power Station, which still stands in Rozelle.

== History ==
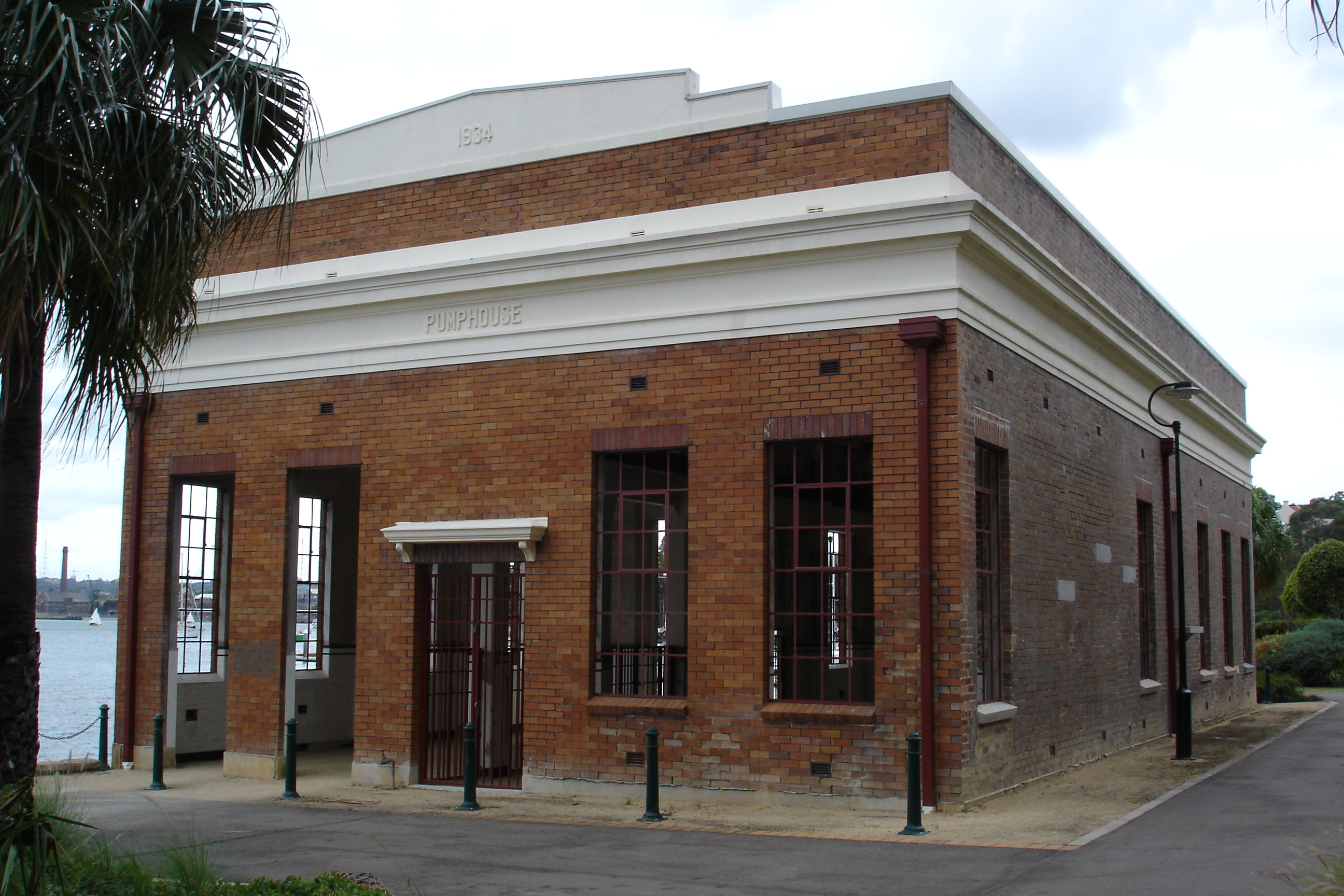
The pump house, built in 1934.

In 1903, the Public Health Department directed Balmain Council to find alternatives to the open tip dumping of local rubbish. The council invited tenders for a combined garbage destructor and power plant and on 30 September 1909, the newly constructed power station 'A' commenced operation. Power came from 2 Belliss and Morcom high-speed engines coupled to 5000-volt BTH generators. The output was 500 kW from one machine and 250 kW from the other. Steam came from two Babcock & Wilcox chain grate coal-fired boilers plus the destructor boiler. In 1913 two Willans & Robinson 900 kW turbo generators were added. These were further accompanied by a Curtis-BTH 2.5 MW turbine (Number 1) in 1914. A Curtis-BTH 3 MW machine (Number 2) was added in 1922. A 7.5 MW Fraser & Chalmers machine was added in 1923. Steam came from additional Babcock & Wilcox chain grate boilers. This brought "A" Station capacity to 15 MW. In 1928 a 10 MW Curtis - BTH machine (Number 3) was installed, and in 1935 an 18.75 MW AEG turbine (Number 4) was added, bringing total capacity to 41 MW. In 1947 and 1953 the first two Babcock & Wilcox boilers were transferred to Muswellbrook power station.

'B' Station:- A second phase of construction took place between 1940 and 1950. A 9.4 MW English Electric back pressure turbine (Number 5) was installed. This was a high-pressure turbine that sent its exhaust steam to the "A" Station lower-pressure turbines. 1952 saw the addition of a 25 MW Parsons steam turbine (Number 6). Two more Parsons 25 MW machines (Number 7 and Number 8) were added by 1956. Steam for machines 5–8 was supplied by four high-pressure Babcock & Wilcox pulverized coal boilers. This doubled the generation capacity of the plant, bringing it to 126.2 MW.

The original station was a private facility, owned by the Electric Light and Power Supply Corporation (EL&PSC), which supplied electricity to consumers and businesses in Balmain, Leichhardt, Ashfield, Newtown and Petersham. It also supplied power to large enterprises in the local area including Mort's Dock and the Balmain Colliery.

The Balmain Electric Light Company Purchase Act 1950 (NSW) enabled the acquisition of the plant by the Electricity Commission of New South Wales. A legal dispute over the valuation of the power station then ensued which delayed the sale until January 1957 when the plant changed hands for £600,000. The plant continued to supply power until 1976 when it was decommissioned.

== Today ==
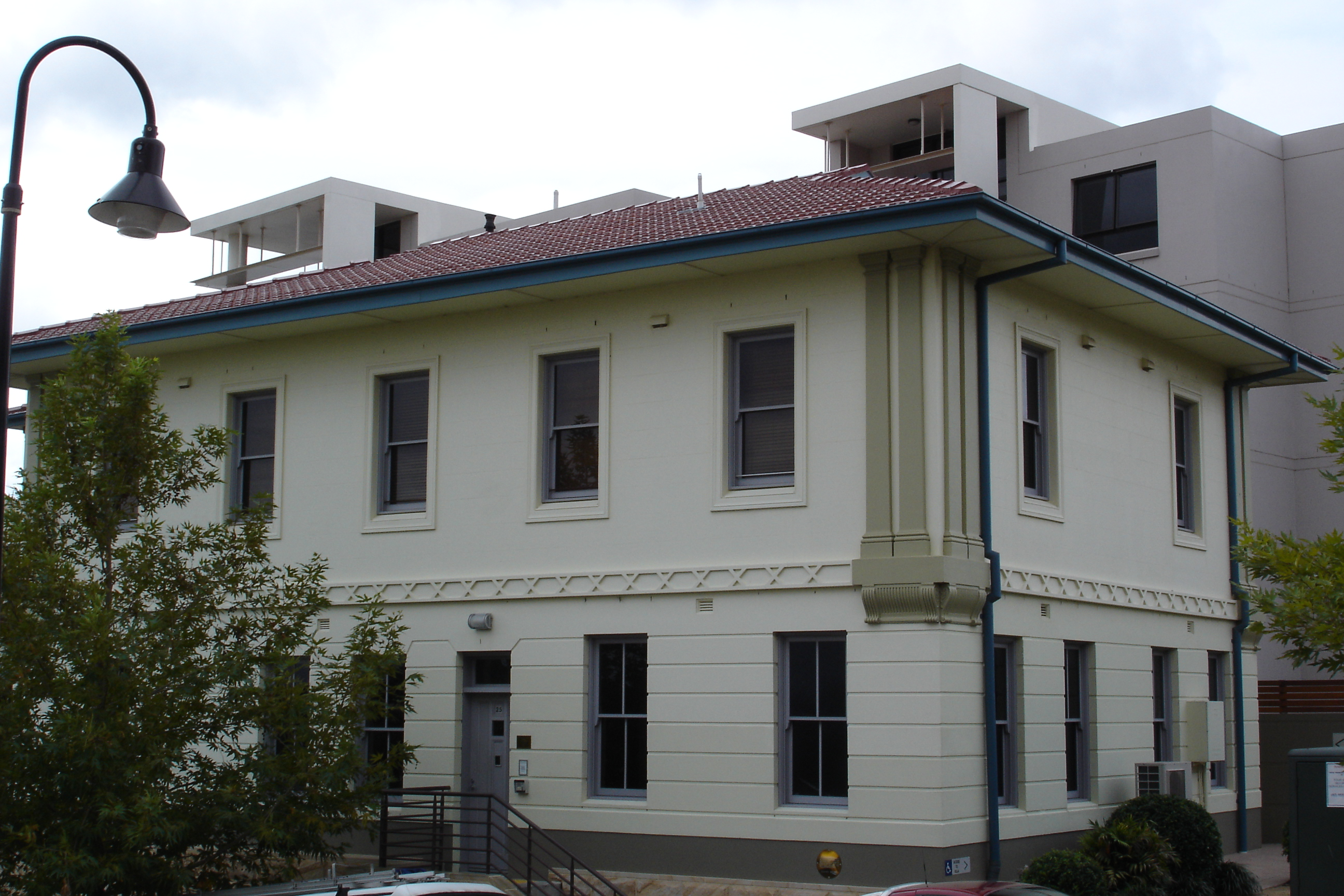
The former administration block.

The power station was demolished in 1998, and the Balmain Shores apartment complex was built on the site. Prior to its demolition, the 'B' Station was used as the set of an episode of the ABC program Police Rescue.

Only two of the original buildings remain as part of the new development:

- Power Station 'A' pump house — This 1934 building is located on the foreshore and was used to house the generators powering the electric pumps taking cold water from the river to the station. The water was used to cool condensers before being pumped back to the river.

None of the original machinery exists in the well-preserved red brick building. However, the original copper letters spelling the words "Power Station" were salvaged from the main building prior to demolition and are hung at the eastern end of the pump house.

- Administration block — The former administration block was built in the 1930s and housed offices for the EL&PSC. The building has been renamed The Villa and forms part of the Balmain Shores complex. It was declared a heritage building prior to the official re-opening in March 2003.

== See also ==
- Electric Light and Power Supply Corporation
- Electricity
- Electricity generation
- Future energy development
- Renewable energy
- Environmental concerns with electricity generation

== Notes ==
- State Records NSW, Electricity Commission of New South Wales, Agency Detail
- Solling, M; Reynolds, P; Leichhardt: On the margins of the city, Allen & Unwin, 1997, ISBN 1-86448-408-X.
- Pacific Power, Demolition of Balmain Power Station, Rozelle. Statement of Environmental Effects, Pacific Power Services, October 1994.
- The Balmain Association, Peninsula Observer, Volume 28, Number 6, Issue 226, December 1993.
- NSW Government - Department of Planning, Harbour Circle Walk - Loop and Alternate Walks
- On-site Information Plaques, Balmain Shores Apartment Complex, Rozelle, NSW.
