= Pyrmont Power Station =

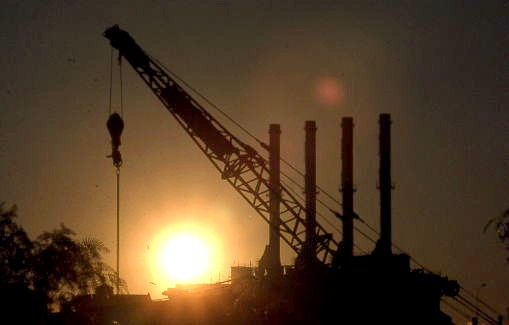
- Pyrmont ('B') Power Station before demolition
- Country: Australia
- Location: Pyrmont, New South Wales
- Coordinates: 33°52′05″S 151°11′39″E
- Status: Decommissioned
- Owners: Municipal Council of Sydney, Electricity Department; Sydney County Council; Electricity Commission of NSW

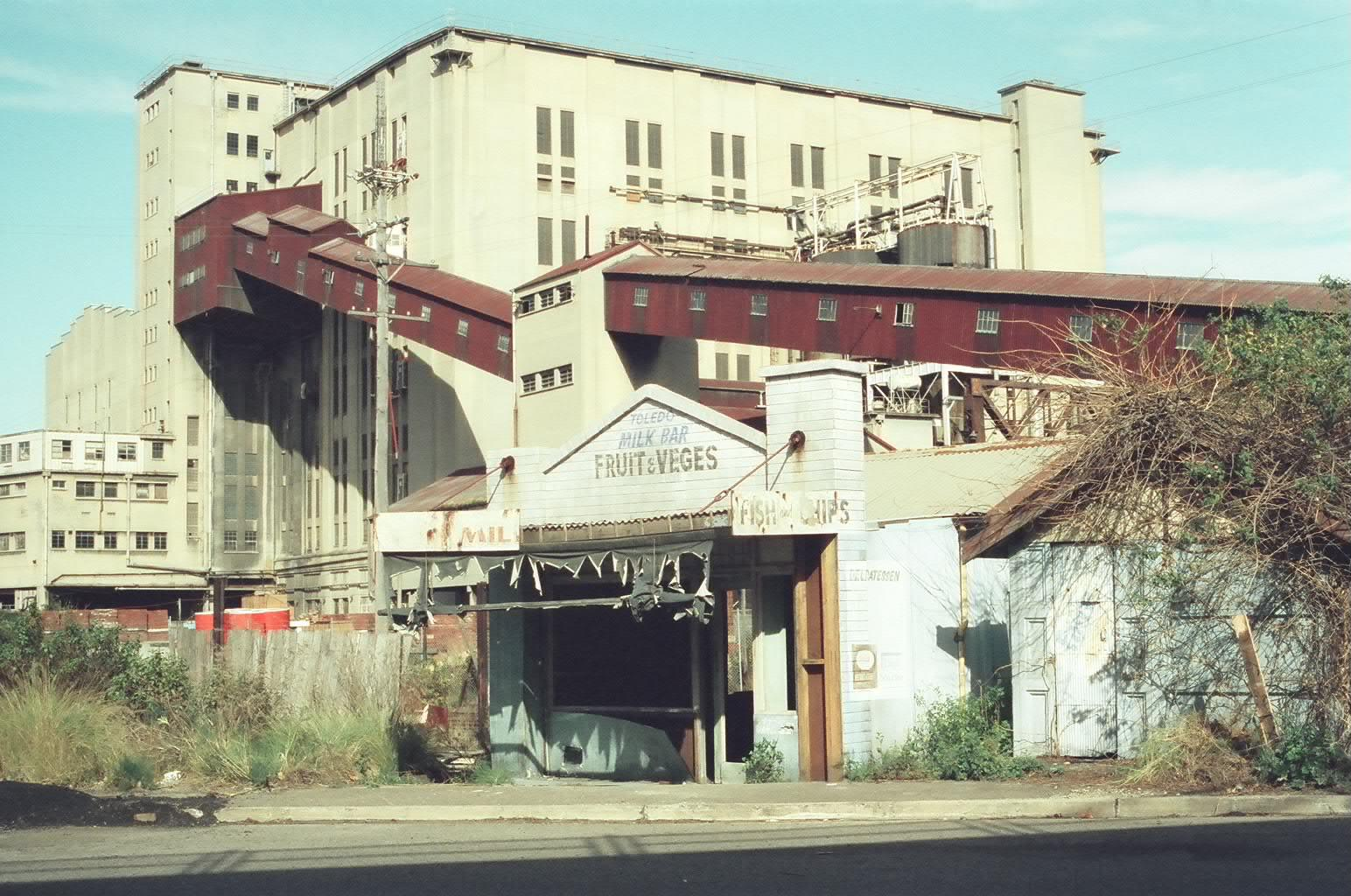
The power station in 1992, after chimneys were removed

Pyrmont Power Station was an electricity generating plant located in the Sydney suburb of Pyrmont, New South Wales.

== Sydney Electric Lighting Station ==
The power station was built by the Electric Lighting Department of the Municipal Council of Sydney, and began operations in 1904 as the Sydney Electric Lighting Station. The original equipment included three Ferranti cross compound reciprocating steam engines, one of 500 horsepower (hp) and two of 1,000 hp, each of which drove a three-phase alternator from Dick, Kerr & Co. for a total output of approximately 1,500 kilovolt-amperes (kVA). In 1905, two additional triple expansion 1,000 hp engines coupled to Dick Kerr 600 kW alternators were commissioned, increasing total capacity to approximately 2,700 KW. Steam was supplied by 5 Babcock & Wilcox WIF chain grate boilers, each 10,000 lb/hr at 160 psi. The five reciprocating engines were relegated to emergency use from 1911 and retired in 1916.

== Turbo-alternators ==
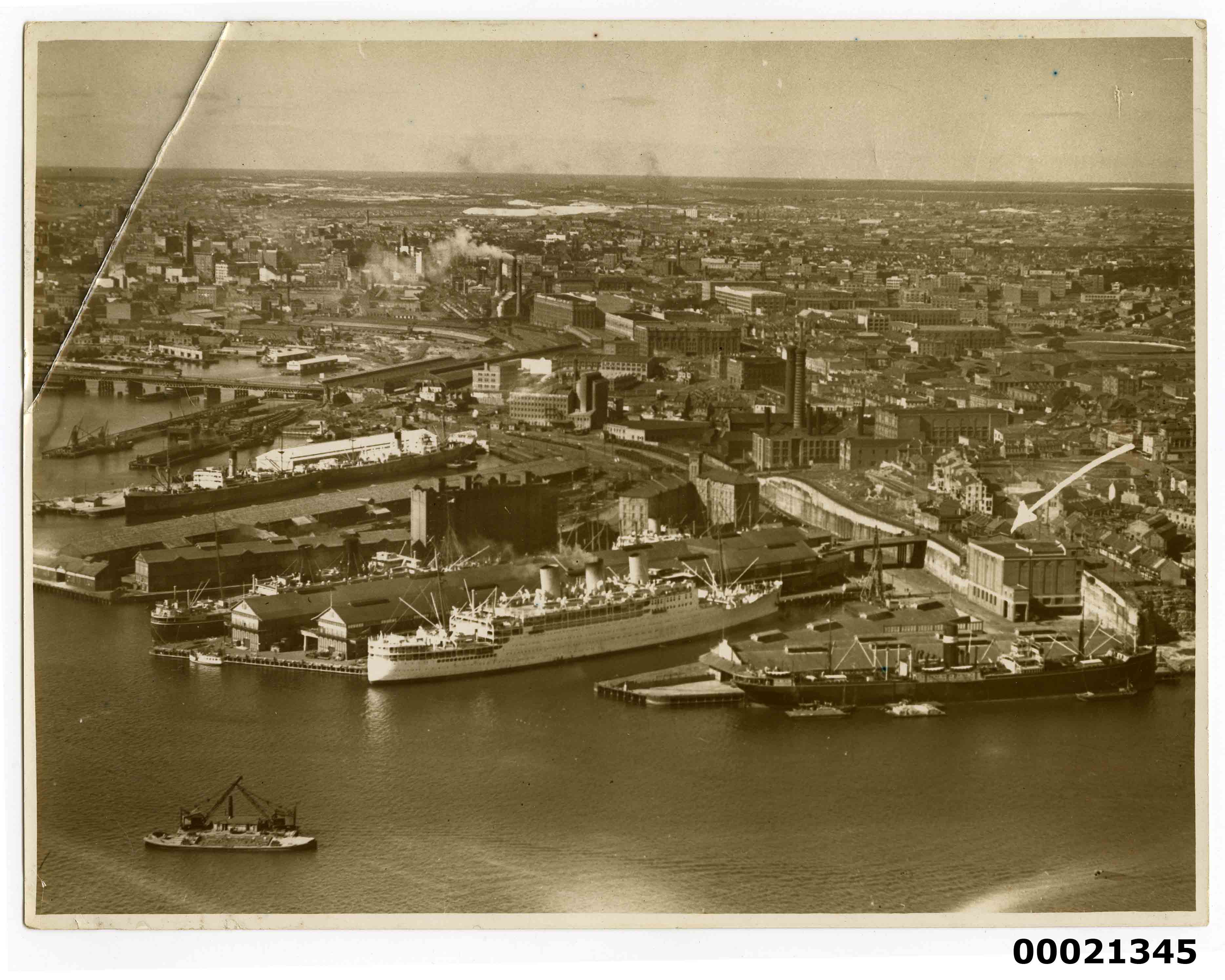
Aerial view of Pyrmost with the power station at center right, probably circa 1940 (the white arrow indicates the Pyrmont Cold Store building)

Low-pressure plant: two Willans & Robinson / Dick, Kerr & Co. turbo-alternators were commissioned in 1907 (Nos 6+7), each with a capacity of 2 MW. Steam was supplied by 4 Stirling boilers whose smoke exhausted to the original chimney. This plant remained in service until 1920, when the two turbo-generators were relocated at Ultimo PS as No3+4 and the four boilers were demolished to make room for the high-pressure plant. In 1909 No 2 engine house was built to the southern side of the original engine house and provided room for more turbines. 2 Willans & Robinson 4 MW reaction turbines were added in 1910(Nos8+9). Another Willans & Robinson 4 MW reaction turbo-alternator was added in 1912(No10). 1 AEG 5 MW impulse turbine was added in 1914(No11). This turbo alternator had a short life and was replaced. Steam was supplied by 6 Babcock & Wilcox coal-fired watertube boilers; each produced 24,000 lb per hour(1908) and in 1913 another 6 boilers each producing 27,000 lb/Hr at 160 psi in Boiler House No2. These boilers were natural draft and exhausted into two large chimneys. The resultant lack of efficient combustion meant that the pollution(black smoke) from the stations' three chimneys was very bad. Total station capacity was increased to 14.7 MW including the reciprocating engines. In 1915 two Babcock+Wilcox cross drum forced draft boilers each with an output of 40,000 lb/hr and a 5 MW AEG generator(No11) were added. The low pressure plant remained in service until 1937 when other power stations (Bunnerong) came on line.

High-pressure plant: in 1919, engine house No 1 was stripped of the reciprocating plant to allow the installation of larger turbines. One Metro-Vickers 8 MW generator was added in 1921,(No15). Two Metro-Vickers 12 MW generators were added in 1922,(Nos 13+14). One Fraser+Chalmers 12 MW generator(No17) and 1 Thompson 17.5 MW machine (No16) were added in 1924. Steam was supplied by 8 Babcock & Wilcox balanced-draft cross-drum boilers, each producing 65,000 lb/hr at 250 psi and 630 °F (332 °C) in Boiler House No3, to the north of the original building. 'A' Station capacity had increased to 75 MW by 1924 (excluding the decommissioned reciprocating engine-driven plant).

The 1904–1924 installation became known as Pyrmont 'A' Station as the site was expanded. This plant was retired in 1956 when Pyrmont "B" was put into commercial production.

== Direct current supply ==
Dynamotors were provided at Town Hall and Lang Park to supply direct current to customers. Alternating current was adopted as the new standard from 1930, although the first AC substation did not come into use until 1935. The AC system was not completed until c. 1958. No new DC customers were accepted after 1935, but the existing supply continued, albeit with mercury-arc rectifiers in later years, until 1985.

== Sydney County Council ==
In 1936, all functions of the Electricity Department of the Municipal Council of Sydney were transferred to a new body, known as the Sydney County Council (SCC), which was formed in 1935. The Sydney County Council would be responsible for the supply of electricity to numerous constituent municipalities in the greater Sydney region. The constituent municipal councils elected and controlled the new body. This arrangement continued until 1952, when the SCC's generation responsibilities were transferred to the Electricity Commission of New South Wales.

== Pyrmont 'B' Station ==
By the late 1930s, the first turbo-alternators were nearing the end of their useful lives, and it was decided to redevelop the power station in 1938. In 1942, the SCC accepted the tender of Australian General Electric to supply a single 50-megawatt (MW), 50 Hz turbo-alternator manufactured by Metropolitan-Vickers Electrical Company Limited of Trafford Park, Manchester, England; the order was confirmed in 1944. This order was doubled in 1945, then doubled again in 1947, to a total of four 50 MW Range-units. These units generated current at 33 kV, which was also the transmission voltage, as there was no room for step-up transformers. Steam was supplied by 4 International Combustion Limited 'Lopulco' Pulverised fuel boilers each producing 430,000 lbs of steam per hour at 1250 psi and 950 °F. Delayed by a post-Second World War backlog, the first 50 MW turbo-alternator arrived from England in 1948, but the new building designed to house it, construction of which commenced in 1947, was not ready. The first of the 50 MW units was not commissioned until 1952, five years behind schedule, and the fourth unit was in service by 1955.

When completed in 1955, Pyrmont 'B' was rated at 200 megawatts, making it the largest of the five power stations which existed in the inner Sydney area. Bunnerong Power Station, also formerly operated by the SCC, was much larger, but outside the inner city area. Pyrmont became an emergency generator from the 1970s onwards, as newer power stations were brought into use.

'B' Station was decommissioned in 1983 (along with White Bay Power Station). The station had little more than twenty years in regular use, and ten years as a peak loader or on stand by.

== Electricity Commission of New South Wales ==
From 1936 to 1952, Pyrmont was run by the Sydney County Council (SCC), which had assumed control of the Municipal Council of Sydney's generating assets. The Electricity Commission of New South Wales, formed in 1950, took control of Pyrmont on 1 January 1952, becoming its third and final operator.

== Demolition ==
After remaining derelict for almost a decade, the power station site was redeveloped as the Star City Casino (now "The Star"), which was opened in 1997 with a gala opening featuring an outdoor performance by Diana Ross. Part of the 'A' Station facade remains at the Star site, on Pyrmont Street near Jones Bay Road, but the much larger 'B' Station structure was completely demolished in 1993.
