= Ultimo Power Station =

Former power station in Sydney, NSW

The Ultimo Power Station, or Ultimo Powerhouse, was an electricity generating plant located in the inner-city Sydney suburb of Ultimo, New South Wales. Commissioned in 1899, it was the first major power station in Sydney and was originally built to supply power for the electric tram network. Prior to this, a small installation had existed at Regent Street, which was brought into use on 15 June 1882. Additionally, experimental electric tram operations powered by small generators had been in intermittent use in Sydney since 1890.

== Generating plant ==
Ultimo Power Station boasted a mixture of equipment, initially consisting of American-made steam engines coupled to dynamoelectric machines (direct current generators). Later generating units were British-made turbo-alternators. Most of the alternating current (AC) equipment operated at 6,600 volts, 25 cycles per second.

=== Direct current plant – 600 V ===
The original generating plant at Ultimo consisted of four cross-compound, reciprocating steam engines supplied by E. P. Allis & Co. of Milwaukee, Wisconsin, each rated at 1250 horsepower (hp) and running at 100 rpm. HP cylinder diameter was 26 in (660 mm) and LP cylinder diameter was 48 in (1,219 mm). Steam pressure was 125 pounds per square inch (860 kPa). Each steam engine was coupled to a multi-pole, compound-wound dynamo supplied by the General Electric Company (GE) of Schenectady, New York. Each dynamo (generator) was rated at 849.75 kW (1,139.53 hp) at 550 volts direct current (1545 amperes) and could be overloaded by up to 50 percent to satisfy peak demand. To cater to the growing demand of the electrified tram network, the engines were frequently run at 1,600 hp (1,200 kW). Each tram had less than 200 hp (150 kW) worth of motors, but the original installation did not allow for growth. It followed that expansion of the power station beyond the initial four units was planned from the beginning.

Steam was initially supplied by 14 horizontal multi-tubular under-fired (Colonial) fire tube boilers by G. & C. Hoskins, Sydney. Each was rated at 300 hp (220 kW) and operated at a pressure of 140 psi (970 kPa). The boilers were hand fired and had natural draught to a single chimney at the end of the building. Only twelve boilers were needed to provide sufficient steam for full-capacity power generation, leaving two in reserve.

The original generating units were removed in 1915 and 1916, but some of the boilers were retained (see below).

=== First alternators – 6600 V, 25 Hz ===
The George St tram line experienced serious voltage drop problems, especially at the Circular Quay end. To fix this situation, alternators were brought into use from 1902, starting with three 1500 kW/6.6 kV units supplied by GE. Each alternator was powered by an Allis Reynolds vertical cross compound condensing reciprocating steam engine rated at 2500 hp at 75 rpm. HP cylinder diameter was 32 inches (810 mm) and the LP cylinder diameter was 64 inches (1,600 mm) with a 60 inches (1,500 mm) stroke. The 40-pole alternators generated three phase current at 25 Hz.

Alterations to the boiler house at this stage saw six of the original boilers removed. Then eight Babcock & Wilcox long-drum, chain-grate boilers were added. Steam pressure was 160 pounds per square inch (1,100 kPa) and superheaters gave a final temperature of 466 °F (241 °C). As more generators were installed an additional 24 new boilers from Babcock & Wilcox (UK), each rated at 450 hp at 160 lb/sq in were added. By 1904 a total of thirty two B&W boilers were then on site.

Provision (foundations) was made for the addition of three more reciprocating steam engine-alternator sets, but this was abandoned in favour of turbo-alternators.

Vertical engine nos 5, 7 and 9 were removed between 1912 and 1914 to allow the addition of turbo-alternators.

=== Turbo-alternators – 6600 V, 25 Hz ===
The first turbo-alternator was brought into use at Ultimo Power Station on 9 January 1905(No6)Supplied by C.A. Parsons & Company of Newcastle-upon-Tyne, England. The steam turbine was rated at 3000 hp, ran at 1500 rpm and drove an 1875 kW alternator at 50 Hz. The steam was raised in 16 new Babcock & Wilcox (UK) boilers, installed in 1905, bringing the total number of boilers on site to 48. These boilers were placed on top of the 32 original boilers.

Two additional turbo-alternators were brought into use in 1909. Supplied by C.A. Parsons & Company, each was rated at 5000 kW with an overload capacity of 7500 kW and generated three phase alternating current at 25 Hz. They were numbered 10 and 12. Twelve new Babcock & Wilcox (UK) superheated boilers were added in 1910, and another 8 were added in 1913. They were also placed on top of the original boilers. The remaining eight fire-tube boilers were removed in 1912/13 to make room for coal bunkers.

In 1911 a 5 MW 25 Hz Willans Dick-Kerr turbo-alternator was installed with a similar 5 MW machine added in 1913. These machines replaced the vertical generators and were numbered 5 and 8.

In 1912, a Dick, Kerr turbo-alternator rated at 7.5 MW 25 Hz, with an overload capacity of 10.5 MW was brought into use at Ultimo as unit No.7. This machine had originally been intended for installation at White Bay Power Station, and it was later transferred there in 1918. In 1914 another Dick Kerr 8.7 MW 25 Hz set was installed as No9.

Two 2.3 MW Dick Kerr alternators(ex Pyrmont) were added in 1919 and numbered 1+2. When the DC section was finally closed down in 1920, the remaining horizontal engines were replaced with two more 2.4 MW Dick-Kerr 50 Hz turbo alternators and numbered 3 & 4. Also, five rotary converters were installed to supply the required DC power. In 1921 it was decided that Ultimo would only generate 25 Hz power. The four small 50 Hz turbo generators were removed, with the last set removed in 1928. The first turbo generator (No. 6) was removed in 1922.

=== High-pressure turbo-alternators ===
In 1929, work began to replace the 58 small boilers with six larger boilers operating at 350 pounds per square inch (2,400 kPa) and rated at 90,000 pounds of steam per hour. Steam outlet temperature was 744 °F (396 °C). The new boilers were the first to burn pulverised coal in any power station in New South Wales. Flue gasses were directed up the two brick chimneys built in 1902. Accompanying the new boilers were two 20 MW AGE-BTH turbo-alternators. They were numbered 1 and 2. This work was completed in 1931. In 1941, two more Babcock + Wilcox High Head boilers rated at 90,000 pounds of steam per hour, operating at a pressure of 355 pounds per square inch (2,450 kPa) and 850 °F (454 °C), were brought into use. They had a balanced draught system and were fitted with chain grate stokers, and their flue gasses were taken away by two new short steel stacks. This was followed in 1942 by the commissioning of a third BTH 20 MW turbo-alternator(No4).

In 1948, the two 5000 kW Parsons turbo-alternators Nos 10 and 12 were removed. In 1949, their space was taken by a single 18.75 MW unit manufactured by English Electric (Australia), which had been alternator No.4 at White Bay Power Station since 1924. This 18.75 MW set became No.3 at Ultimo and went into production about 1951. This brought the total installed capacity of Ultimo to its maximum of 79.5 MW.

In 1948/49 the boilers were modified to allow the burning of furnace oil owing to coal supply shortages.

Control of Ultimo Power Station was transferred from the Department of Railways, New South Wales to the newly formed Electricity Commission of New South Wales on 1 January 1953.

=== The Sydney Railway and Tramway Power Grid ===
The Sydney railway and tramway power grid consisted of Ultimo and White Bay Power Stations, which were linked by a 6600 V transmission network and fed railway and tramway sub-feeder stations.

Following the initial 600 V direct current (DC) installation, Ultimo Power Station supplied three phase alternating current (AC) at 6600 V, 25 cycles per second. Originally, this current was not stepped up for transmission. Rotary converters were used to convert the three phase AC to 600 V DC for the tram supply. The 1500 V DC heavy rail electrification commenced operation in 1926 and also initially used high capacity rotary converters.

A 25–50 Hz frequency changer was installed at White Bay in 1939, allowing power generated at the two railway power stations to be fed into Sydney County Council's 50 Hz grid as required.

The gradual elimination of electric trams from Sydney reduced the demand on the 25 Hz grid. In 1959, it was decided to abandon 25 Hz generation altogether.

=== Decommissioning ===
Following the closure of the Sydney tram network in 1961, Ultimo Power Station was decommissioned in 1963. The site was later repurposed as a wing of the Powerhouse Museum.

== Engineering heritage award ==
The power station received a Historic Engineering Marker from Engineers Australia as part of its Engineering Heritage Recognition Program.
