= Bunnerong Power Station =

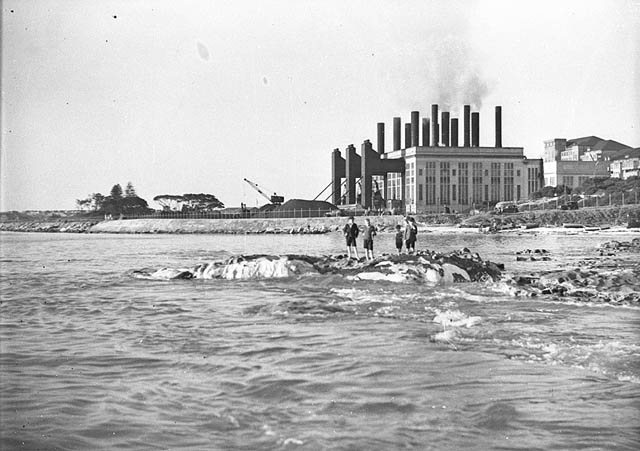
- Boys fishing with Bunnerong 'A' Power Station in the background.
- Country: Australia
- Location: Matraville, New South Wales
- Coordinates: 33°58′17″S 151°13′38″E
- Status: Demolished 1987
- Commission date: 1929
- Decommission date: 1975
- Owners: Municipal Council of Sydney, Electricity Department; Sydney County Council; Electricity Commission of NSW

Thermal power station
- Primary fuel: High-grade, solid black coal
- Turbine technology: Steam turbine

Power generation
- Units operational: Boilers: 28 (18 + 4 + 4); Turbines: 11 (7 + 4)
- Nameplate capacity: 375 MW

External links
- Commons: Related media on Commons

Bunnerong Power Station was a coal-fired power station in the south-eastern Sydney suburb of Matraville, New South Wales, Australia that was decommissioned by 1975 and subsequently demolished. When the last generating units were commissioned, it was the largest power station in the southern hemisphere, with a capacity of 375 megawatts (MW) from eleven turbo-alternators. It was able to supply up to one third of the state's electricity needs at the time. It remained the most powerful until the completion of Vales Point Power Station in 1966.

In 1924, the 117-acre site for the power station was chosen. The station was located on Bunnerong Road in Matraville.

== Bunnerong 'A' Station - 175 MW ==
Bunnerong was originally built with eighteen cross drum boilers from Babcock & Wilcox Ltd (UK), supplying steam at 350 psi (2,400 kPa) and 700 °F (371 °C), with each boiler producing 100,000 lb/h (45,000 kg/h) of steam. Six 25 megawatt (MW) Metropolitan-Vickers two-cylinder turbo-alternators were built between 1926 and 1930 by the Electricity Department of the Municipal Council of Sydney, one of the two main authorities responsible for electricity generation at the time. The first turbo-alternator commenced operation in January 1929, and the sixth in January 1930. Current was generated at 11 kilovolts (kV) and stepped up to 33 kV for transmission. With a capacity of 150 MW, Bunnerong was the largest power station in New South Wales. A seventh 25 MW unit was brought into use in September 1937, expanding capacity to 175 MW. This original installation was later known as Bunnerong 'A' Station.

== Bunnerong 'B' Station - 200 MW ==
Bunnerong 'B' Station began operation in 1939, with the commissioning of a 3-stage 50 MW turbo-alternator (Number 8) supplied by C.A. Parsons and Company. A second 50 MW turbine (Number 9) followed in 1941, bringing the capacity of Bunnerong to 275 MW. Bunnerong 'B' Boilerhouse had four Babcock & Wilcox pulverized fuel boilers, each produced 300,000 lbs/hr of steam at 600psi. In 1949, two oil fired, Velox boilers from Gibson, Battle & Co Pty Ltd of Sydney were added. Each could produce an additional 165,000 lbs/hr of steam at 600PSI and 825 °F. Being a range type station these Velox boilers could supply steam to either A or B stations.

The boilers of 'A' Station suffered from reduced efficiency and clinker-related shutdowns owing to shortages of high grade hand-selected coal after the mechanization of mining began. The more modern 'B' Station was designed to handle the lower quality, impure coal extracted in mechanized mining, but supply difficulties meant that it often received the high grade product intended for 'A' Station. In 1946, supplementary oil burners were fitted to every boiler, to mitigate the consequences of coal shortages and quality issues.

A third 50 MW Parsons turbo-alternator was commissioned in 1947, followed by a fourth identical unit. These final two machines were fed by four Simon-Carves pulverized fuel boilers rated at 300,000 lb/hour, exhausting to a large concrete chimney. The completion of Bunnerong 'B' Station increased the total capacity to a continuously rated 375 MW, making Bunnerong the largest power station in the southern hemisphere. During overload testing in 1958, a maximum of 382 MW was achieved.

After the completion of 'B' Station, more than 1,600 people were employed on the site. A number of industrial disputes relating to unsatisfactory working conditions resulted in reduced power output, sometimes for weeks on end.

== Bunnerong Railway Branch ==
The council operated its own private railway which connected the power station with Botany Goods Yard. The railway continued to operate as a private line when the power station was taken over by the Electricity Commission, including the shunting of a siding to the Boral plant. On 19 November 1966, there was a fatal accident when a train ran away down the steep grade of this siding.

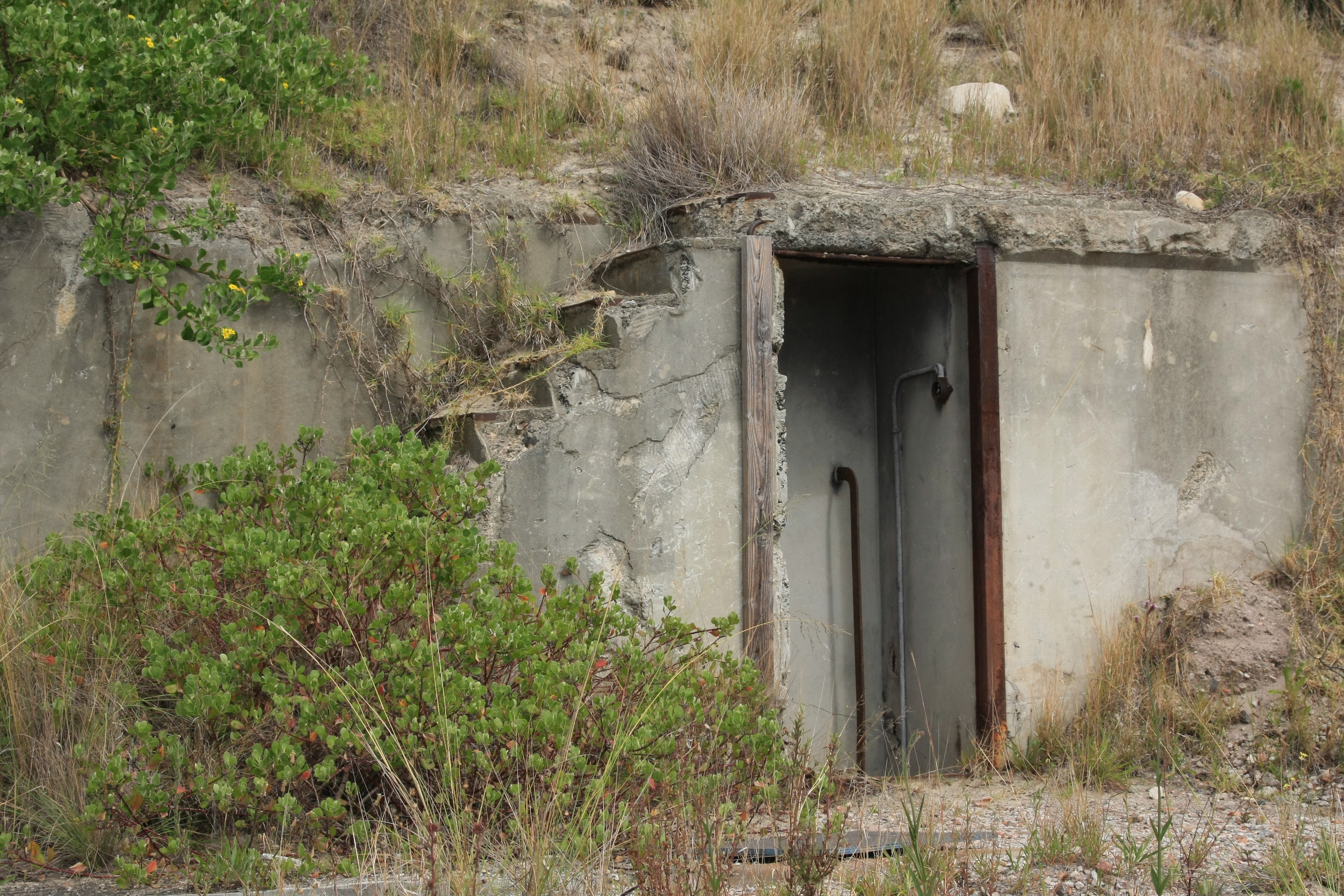
A ladder leading to an underground chamber

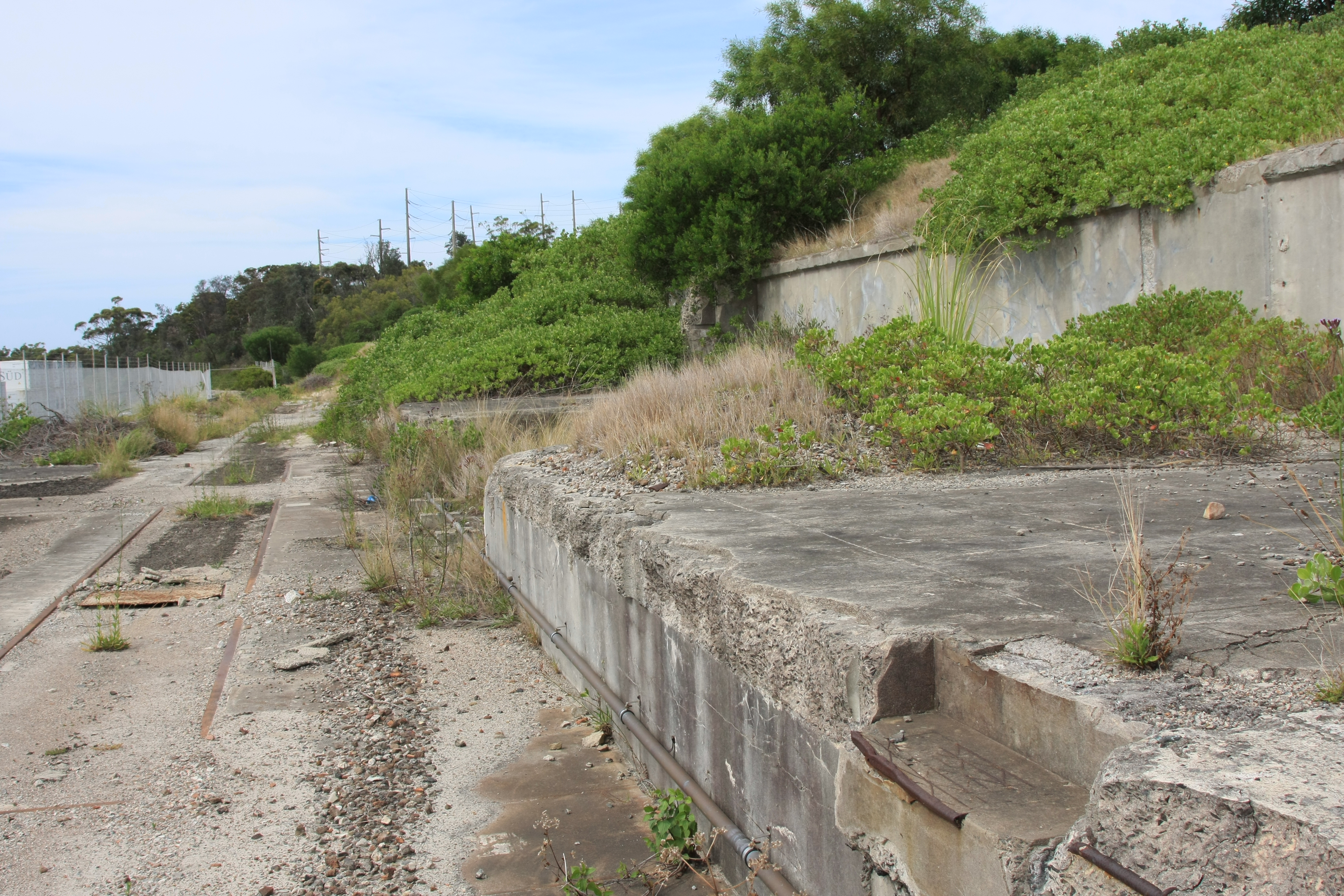
Former train line for the power plant

== Electricity Commission of New South Wales ==
The Electricity Commission of New South Wales was formed in 1950, and assumed control of the generating assets of the Sydney County Council (which had taken over the Municipal Council of Sydney's power stations in 1936), including Bunnerong and Pyrmont in 1952.

== Closure and Demolition ==
With the completion of newer power stations, Bunnerong 'A' was out of use by 1973, 'B' Station was relegated to emergency supply duties, and the entire installation was finally decommissioned in 1975. The removal of equipment began in 1978 and was largely completed by 1981. Peak load gas turbines were in use on the site from 1982 to 1984, but demolition commenced after their removal. The 112 metre-high concrete emission stack of Bunnerong 'B' boilerhouse was demolished in December 1986, and the majority of the huge structures of 'A' and 'B' Stations were razed by 28 June 1987. Demolition was largely undertaken by the American company, Controlled Demolition Incorporated. The large switch house dating from 1926 remained in place until its levelling in March 1994. Few traces of the power station remain.
