= List of wind farms in New South Wales =

The wind resource potential in NSW is very good, yet this potential has remained largely untapped. The NSW Wind Atlas shows that many of the sites with good potential for wind farms are situated on the western side of the Great Dividing Range. While the wind is also strong in coastal areas, wind farms are unlikely to be built there due to existing residential development and national park areas. NSW also has an extensive electricity transmission network, providing relatively good power grid access for new wind farms.

As of March 2015, there was 625 MW of wind power installed in NSW. As of May 2019, there was 1493 MW of wind power installed in NSW.

To measure public attitudes to wind farms, the NSW government surveyed 2000 people and 300 businesses in rural NSW in late 2010. About 80 per cent of respondents said they would strongly support wind farms in their region. Support dropped off somewhat if a wind farm was proposed closer to a person's house but 60 per cent still supported wind turbines within two kilometres of their house. About 13 per cent of people surveyed, many aged over 65, said they did not support wind power.

== Wind farms in New South Wales ==
Hampton Wind Farm

A list of operating and planned wind farms in New South Wales is below.

=== Operating ===
| Project name | Sponsoring company | Coordinates | Turbines | Capacity (MW) | Status | Completion date | Notes |
|---|---|---|---|---|---|---|---|
| Bango Wind Farm | Wind Prospect / CWP | 34.34°S 148.47°E | 46 | 244 | Operating | 2023 | First project in Australia to use General Electric 5.3 MW Turbines. |
| Biala Wind Farm | BJCE Australia | | 31 | 110 | Operating | 2021 | |
| Blayney Wind Farm | Eraring Energy | 33°37′19″S 149°11′54″E | 15 | 9.9 | Operating | 2000 | |
| Boco Rock Wind Farm | Wind Prospect / CWP | 36.577°S 149.124°E | 67 | 113 | Operating | 2015 | |
| Bodangora Wind Farm | Infigen Energy | 32.445°S 149.04°E | 33 | 113.2 | Operating | 2019 | 33 GE 3.4-130 Turbines |
| Capital Wind Farm | Infigen Energy | 35.1458°S 149.5671°E | 67 | 140.7 | Operating | 2009 | |
| Collector Wind Farm | RATCH-Australia | 34.85°S 149.39°E | 55 | 228 | Operating | 2021 | |
| Crookwell Wind Farm | Tilt Renewables (formerly Eraring Energy) | 34.457°S 149.472°E | 8 | 4.8 | Operating | 1998 | |
| Crookwell 2 Wind Farm | Unión Fenosa Wind Australia | 34.541°S 149.570°E | 46 | 92 | Operating | 2018 | |
| Crudine Ridge Wind Farm | Wind Prospect / CWP | 32.943°S 149.678°E | 37 | 135 | Operating | 2021 | |
| Cullerin Range Wind Farm | Epuron (owned by EDL) | 34.899°S 149.648°E | 15 | 30 | Operating | 2009 | Developed by Epuron, built by Origin, sold to EDL |
| Gullen Range Wind Farm | Goldwind Australia / JNCEC | 34°36′52.04″S 149°27′34.31″E | 73 | 165.5 | Operating | 2013 | |
| Gunning Wind Farm | Acciona | 34.697°S 149.383°E | 31 | 46.5 | Operating | 2011 | |
| Hampton Wind Park | Wind Corporation Australia | 33.6388°S 150.0494°E | 2 | 1.32 | Operating | 2001 | |
| Rye Park Wind Farm | Epuron/Tilt | 34.57°S 148.96°E | 66 | 396 | Operating | 2025 | Cadia-Ridgeway mine |
| Sapphire Wind Farm | CWP Renewables | 29.75°S 151.49°E | 75 | 270 | Operating | 2018 | |
| Silverton Wind Farm | Epuron | 31.97°S 141.46°E | 58 | 200 | Operating | 2019 | |
| Taralga Wind Farm | CBD Energy/Banco Santander | 34.427076°S 149.857640°E | 51 | 107 | Operating | 2015 | |
| White Rock Wind Farm | Goldwind Australia/ CECEP | 29.78°S 151.54°E | 70 | 175 (stage 1) | Operating | 2018 | Approval for up to 119 WTGs. |
| Woodlawn Wind Farm | Infigen Energy | 35.084°S 149.62°E | 23 | 48.3 | Operating | 2011 | |
| Flyers Creek Wind Farm | Iberdrola Australia | 33°34'52.2"S 149°04'22.4"E | 38 | 145 | Operating | 2024 | |

=== Projects ===
| Project name | Sponsoring company | Coordinates | Turbines | Capacity (MW) | Status | Completion date | Notes |
|---|---|---|---|---|---|---|---|
| Black Springs | Wind Corporation | 33.841°S 149.71°E | | 40 | Cancelled | | |
| Bowmans Creek Wind Farm | Epuron | 32.263°S 151.098°E | | 250+ | Feasibility | | |
| Conroys Gap Wind Farm | Epuron | 34.128°S 149.768°E | | 30 | Planning approved | | |
| Cooma | Pacific Hydro | 36.24°S 149.125°E | | 100 | Feasibility | | |
| Coppabella Wind Farm | Epuron | 34.736°S 148.555°E | 75 | 284 | Planning approved | | Sold to Goldwind. |
| Granite Hills Wind Farm | Akuo Energy | | | 132 | Feasibility | | |
| Hills of Gold Wind Farm | Wind Energy | | 98 | 400 | Feasibility | | |
| Jupiter Wind Farm | EPYC Pty Ltd | | | 350 | Cancelled | | |
| Kooragang, Newcastle | EnergyAustralia | 32°52′38.94″S 151°44′54.95″E | | 0.6 | Decommissioned | | |
| Liverpool Range | Epuron | 31.883°S 149.871°E | 267 | 1000 | Planning approved | | |
| Lord Howe Island | | 31.55°S 159.08°E | | 0.3 | Feasibility | | |
| Molonglo | Acciona Energy | 35.2319°S 149.446°E | | 120 | Cancelled | | |
| Mt Spring | ActewAGL | 33.398°S 149.152°E | | 10 | Cancelled | | |
| Paling Yards | Unión Fenosa Wind Australia | 35.144°S 149.022°E | 60 | 204 | Feasibility | | |
| Pottinger | AGL Energy | 34.7°S 144.5°E | | 1300 | Feasibility | | to EnergyConnect |
| Rock Flat Creek | Pacific Hydro | 36.158°S 149.21°E | | 100 | Feasibility | | |
| Snowy Plains Wind Farm (Berridale) | Epuron | 36.154°S 148.565°E | | 26 | Cancelled 2010 | | |
| Upper Hunter Energy Park | Upper Hunter Energy Park Pty Ltd | | 34 | | Feasibility | | |
| Uungula | Wind Prospect / CWP | 32.514°S 149.273°E | 125 | 400 | Under construction | | |

== See also ==
- List of power stations in New South Wales
- Wind power in Australia
