= Eraring Energy =

Former state-owned electricity company

- Type: Government-owned corporation
- Industry: electricity generation
- Founded: 2 August 2000
- Headquarters: Sydney, Australia
- Key people: John Priest, Murray Bleach and Ian Murray (Directors); Peter Jackson (managing director)
- Revenue: ▼ A$609m
- Operating income: ▼ A$584m (2011)
- Net income: ▼ A$(664m)
- Total assets: ▼ A$1,178m
- Total equity: ▼ A$999m
- Owner: Treasurer of New South Wales – 1 share Minister for Finance and Services – 1 share
- Number of employees: ▲406
- Parent: New South Wales Government
- Website: www.eraring-energy.com.au

Eraring Energy was an electricity generation company in Australia that was owned by the Government of New South Wales, and had a portfolio of generating sites using thermal coal, wind, and hydroelectric power. It was sold to Origin Energy in 2013.

Eraring Energy was established in 2000 under the State Owned Corporations Act, 1989 (NSW) and the Energy Services Corporation Act, 1995 (NSW).

== Generation portfolio ==
Eraring Energy owned and operated the following power stations to generate electricity for sale under contract:

Name	Fuel	Type	Location	Maximum Capacity (MW)	Commissioned
Bendeela	Hydro	Turbopump	Kangaroo Valley	80	1977
Blayney	Wind	Wind turbines	Blayney	10	October 2000
Burrinjuck	Hydro	Turbopump	near Yass	28	1938, 1972, 2002
Crookwell	Wind	Wind turbines	Crookwell	5	1998
Eraring	Coal	Steam turbines	Lake Macquarie	2,780^{1}	1982–1984
Hume	Hydro	Turbopump	near Albury	58	1957 & 2000
Kangaroo Valley	Hydro	Turbopump	Kangaroo Valley	160	1977
Keepit	Hydro	Turbopump	near Gunnedah	6	1960 & 1983
Warragamba	Hydro	Turbopump	Warragamba Dam	50^{2}	1959

^1 – Progressively being upgraded to 4 x 720MW; commenced in 2011
^2 – Disconnected

== Energy Reform Project ==
Subsequent to the NSW Government releasing its Energy Reform Transaction Strategy in September 2009, a Direction was issued to Eraring Energy on 14 December 2010 by the Special Minister of State, to the Board to enter into a GenTrader Transaction Implementation Deed.

On 27 February 2011, Eraring Energy entered into Generation Trading Agreements (GTA) with Origin Energy as part of the New South Wales Government's energy reform process with changes to the business as follows:

- The output from Eraring Power Station and the Shoalhaven Scheme Power Stations are separately contracted with Origin Energy. These contracts are due to expire in 2032 (Eraring Power Station) and 2038 (Shoalhaven);
- Eraring Energy is no longer responsible for the future procurement of coal;
- Eraring Energy no longer receives market income for the GTA contracted stations; and
- Eraring Energy is no longer responsible for future costs involved with carbon liabilities.

On 25 February 2011 a Direction was issued by the Special Minister of State to transfer Eraring Energy's shares in Rocky Point Holdings (responsible for the development of the Cobbora coal mine) to the Cobbora Holding Company Pty Limited, a separate NSW statutory corporation.

Under the agreements, Origin Energy has the right to trade the output of Eraring Power Station and Shoalhaven Scheme Power Stations and receive market revenue from these assets. In return, Eraring Energy receives a combination of fixed and variable monthly payments. In the event certain plant availability targets are not met, availability liquidated damages may be payable by Eraring Energy to Origin Energy.

Eraring Energy continues to operate the renewable assets of Hume Power Station, Burrinjuck Power Station, Brown Mountain Power Station, Keepit Power Station, Crookwell Wind Farm, and Blayney Wind Farm.

== Asbestos liabilities ==
Eraring Energy manages the liability for asbestos related illnesses arising from exposure to asbestos at former Electricity Commission of New South Wales and Pacific Power sites. These sites include de-commissioned power stations such as Bunnerong, Ultimo, White Bay, Pyrmont and Wangi Wangi. These liabilities are managed by Eraring Energy on behalf of the NSW Government.
