= List of power stations in New South Wales =

This is a list of active power stations in New South Wales, Australia. Candidates for this list must already be commissioned and capable of generating 1 MW or more of electricity.

== Solar ==
Power station	Max. capacity (MW)	Operator	Technology	Completion date	Notes
Uralla BOC	400	Zen	Photovoltaic	2025	Boc Australia
Moree Solar Farm	56	Fotowatio Renewable Ventures	Photovoltaic	2016	
Beryl Solar Farm	87	New Energy Solar / First Solar	Photovoltaic	2019	110.9 MW DC, 87 MW AC
Finley Solar Farm	133	ESCO Pacific / John Laing	Photovoltaic	2019	175MW DC, 133 MW AC
Royalla Solar Farm	20	Acciona	Photovoltaic	2014	
Nyngan Solar Plant	102	AGL Energy	Photovoltaic	2016	
Broken Hill Solar Plant	53	AGL Energy	Photovoltaic	2016	
Mugga Lane Solar Park, Canberra, ACT	13	Maoneng	Photovoltaic	2017	
Gullen Range Solar Farm	10	Goldwind Australia	Photovoltaic	2017	
Mount Majura Solar Farm Majura, ACT	2.3	Solar Choice	Photovoltaic	2016	Co-developed by Solar Choice and Solar Fields
Williamsdale Solar Farm Williamsdale, ACT	11	ActewAGL	Photovoltaic	2017	
Coleambally Solar Farm	150	Neoen	Photovoltaic	2018	Started full scale operations as of 19 October 2018. Production had ramped up over the preceding months.
Parkes Solar Farm	55	Neoen	Photovoltaic	2018	55MW AC, 66MW DC. Farm was operating at full capacity as of March 2018.
Griffith Solar Farm	36	Neoen	Photovoltaic	2018	
Manildra Solar Farm	48.5	First Solar	Photovoltaic	2018	
White Rock Solar Farm	20	Goldwind Australia	Photovoltaic	2018	
Jemalong CSP Pilot Plant	1.1	Vast Solar	Thermal	2017	
Jemalong Solar Farm	50	Genex Power	Photovoltaic	2021	Developed to approval by Vast Solar, then acquired by Genex Power on 7 September 2018

== Coal fired ==
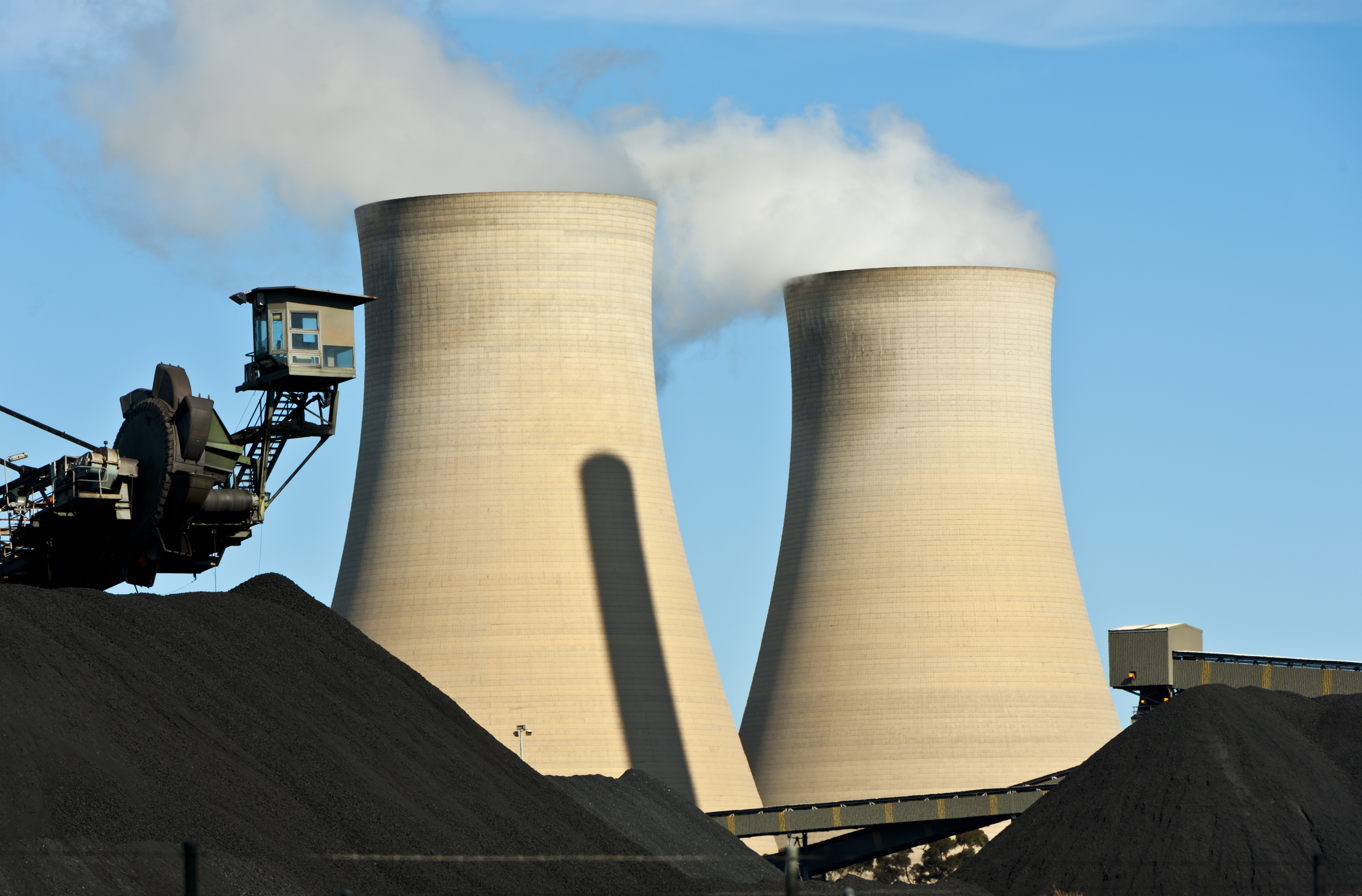
Bayswater Power Station

These fossil fuel power stations burn bituminous coal to power steam turbines that generate some or all of the electricity they produce.

Power station	Max. capacity (MW)	CO2 emissions (tCO2e)	Emission intensity (tCO2e/MWh)	Turbines	Operator	Mine type	Conveyance	Cooling water	Scheduled closure
Bayswater	2,640	13,725,965	0.88	4	AGL Energy	open cut	conveyors, rail	fresh	2035
Eraring	2,880	14,914,916	0.87	4	Origin Energy	underground	rail, truck	salt	30 April 2029
Mount Piper	1,400	6,841,302	0.87	2	EnergyAustralia	underground	road, conveyor	fresh	2040
Vales Point B	1,320	7,015,626	0.86	2	Delta Electricity	underground	conveyors	salt	2028

- In 2007 Delta Electricity re-rated the two units at Mt Piper at 700 MW capacity.
- In February 2022, Origin Energy announced plans to bring forward the closure of Eraring to 2025, pending approval by the Australian Energy Market Operator.

== Gas turbine ==
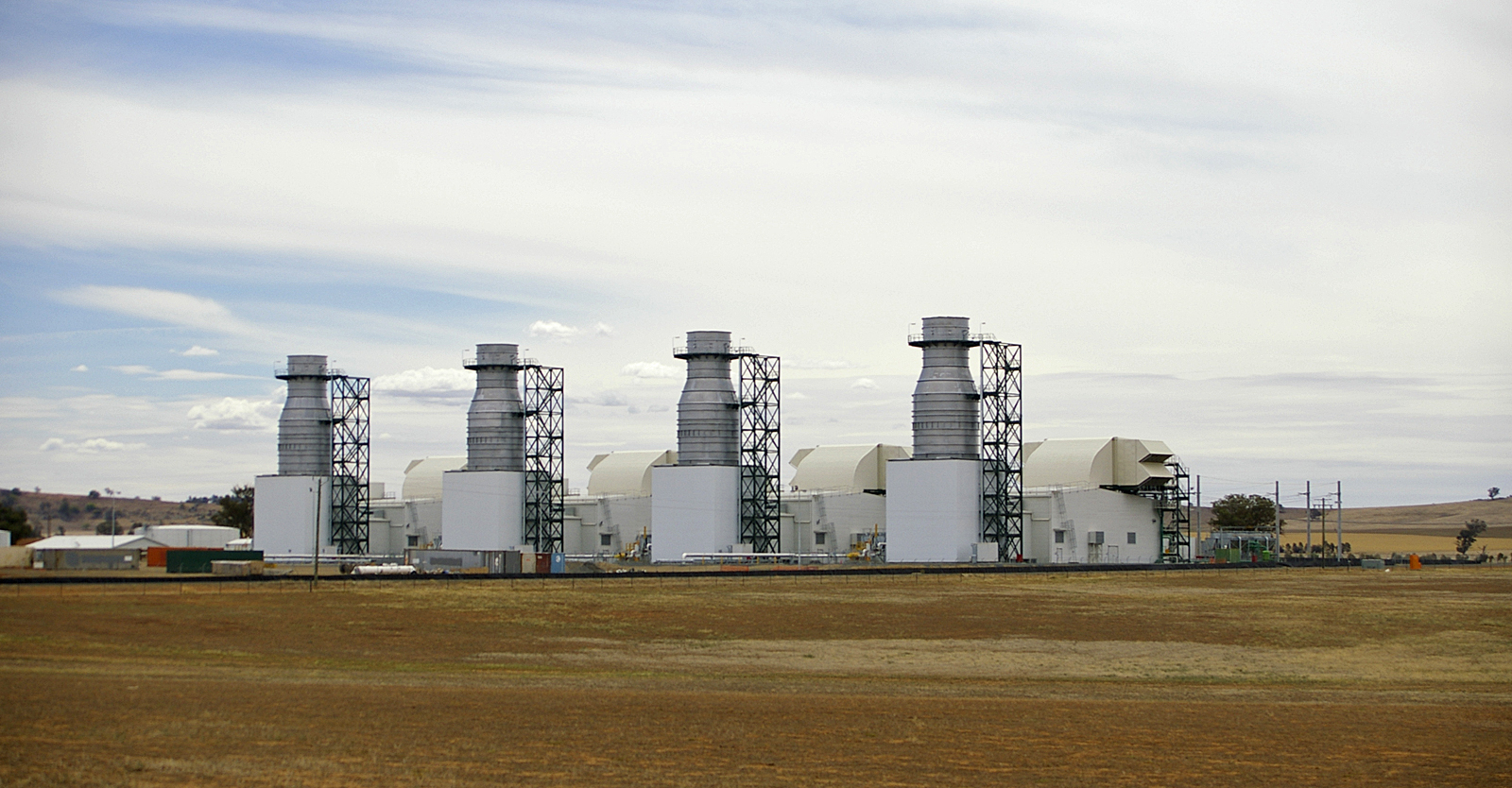
Uranquinty Power Station

These fossil fuel power stations are fired with gas or liquid fuels to produce electricity by use of a gas turbine.

Power station	Operator	Max. capacity (MW)	Emission intensity (tCO2e/MWh)	Turbines	Fuel type	Combined cycle
Colongra	Snowy Hydro	667	0.56	4	natural gas	no
Tallawarra	EnergyAustralia	435	0.37	2	natural gas	yes
Smithfield	Visy	171	0.49	4	natural gas	no
Uranquinty	Origin Energy	641	0.60	4	natural gas	no

== Gas reciprocating engines ==
These power stations use gas combustion in reciprocating engines to generate some or all of the electricity they produce.

Power station	Max. capacity (MW)	Emission intensity (tCO2e/MWh)	Engines	Fuel type
Appin Mine	55.6	0.73	54	coalbed methane+natural gas
Belrose	4	0.08	1	landfill gas
Earthpower Camellia	3.9		3	biogas
Jacks Gully	2.3	0.06	1	landfill gas
Lucas Heights I	5.4	0.06	5	landfill gas
Lucas Heights II	17.3	0.06	15	landfill gas
Sydney Water, Malabar	3		3	sewage gas
Shoalhaven Landfill Gas Project	1	0.05	1	landfill gas
Tahmoor	7	0.57	7	coalbed methane
Teralba	8		8	coalbed methane
Tower Mine	41.2		40	coalbed methane+natural gas
Wilga	11	0.59	11	natural gas
Woodlawn	4		4	landfill gas
Kincumber Landfill Gas Abatement	1	0.07	1	landfill gas
Woy Woy Landfill Gas Abatement	1	0.06	1	landfill gas

== Hydroelectric ==
These hydroelectric power stations use the flow of water to generate electricity.

Power station	Max. capacity (MW)	Turbines	Pumped storage
Bendeela (Shoalhaven)	80	2	yes
Blowering	80	1	no
Brown Mountain	4.95	2	no
Burrendong	14.5	1	no
Burrinjuck	27	3	no
Copeton	24	1	no
Glenbawn	5.8	1	no
Guthega	60	2	no
Hume	58	2	no
Kangaroo Valley (Shoalhaven)	160	2	yes
Keepit	7.2	1	no
Kembla Grange	6.8	2	no
Murray 1	950	10	no
Murray 2	550	4	no
Nymboida	5	7	no
Oaky River	12	5	no
Pindari	5.6	2	no
Snowy 2.0	2000	6	yes
The Drop, Mulwala Canal	2.5	1	no
Tumut 1	330	4	no
Tumut 2	287	4	no
Tumut 3	1500	6	yes
Warragamba	50	1	no
Williams River Dam (private)	7	1	no
Wyangala	22.5	2	no

== Biomass combustion ==
These power stations burn biomass (biofuel) to generate some or all of the electricity they produce.

Power station	Max. capacity (MW)	Turbines	Fuel type	Conveyance
Broadwater Sugar Mill	10	1	bagasse	on-site
Broadwater Biomass Co-Gen	30	1	bagasse/wood waste	on-site & truck
Condong Sugar Mill	3	1	bagasse	on-site
Condong Biomass Co-Gen	30	1	bagasse/wood waste	on-site & truck
Harwood Sugar Mill	4.5	3	bagasse	on-site
Visy, Tumut	21	1	black liquor	on-site

== Cogeneration ==
These power stations capture waste heat to generate some or all of the electricity they produce via cogeneration.

Power station	Max. capacity (MW)
Amcor, Bomaderry	6
BlueScope, Port Kembla	62
Macquarie University	1.5
Stadium Australia	1
University of Western Sydney	1
Visy, Smithfield	6

== Decommissioned coal-fired stations ==
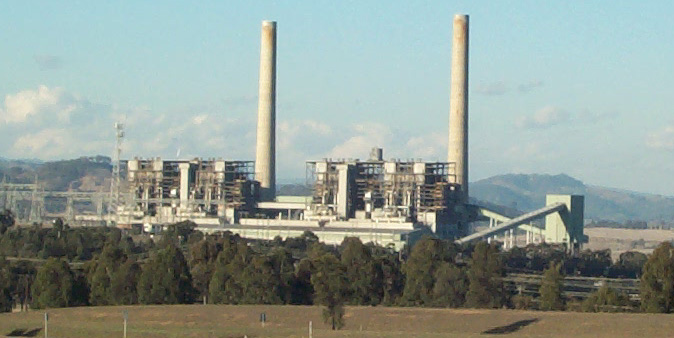
Liddell Power Station

Power station	Max. capacity (MW)	Turbines	Coal type	Mine type	Conveyance	Cooling water
Balmain	126.2	8	bituminous	N/A	ship / lighter	salt
Bunnerong	375	11	bituminous	N/A	railway	salt
Liddell	2051	7	bituminous	open cut	conveyors	fresh
Lithgow	38	4	bituminous	open cut	railway	fresh
Munmorah	1,400	4	bituminous	underground	conveyors	salt
Newcastle East	70.75	6	bituminous	N/A	railway	salt
Pyrmont	200	4	bituminous	N/A	railway	salt
Redbank	150	1	bituminous (tailings)	open cut	conveyors	fresh
Ultimo	79.5	6	bituminous	N/A	railway	salt
Wallerawang	1,240	2	bituminous	underground	road, conveyor	fresh
Wangi	330	6	bituminous	underground	conveyor	fresh
White Bay	100	2	bituminous	N/A	railway	salt

== See also ==
- List of power stations in Australia
