= Binalong railway station and telegraph office =

Former railway station in New South Wales, Australia

Binalong railway station (original alignment)
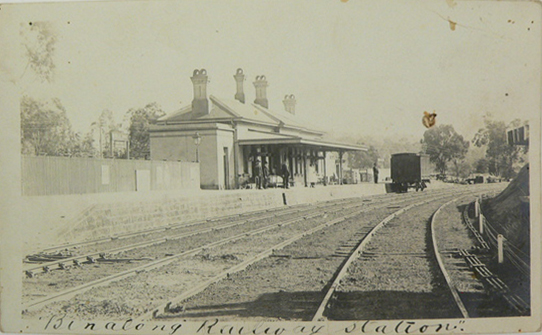
- Binalong Railway station and telegraph office

General information
- Location: 38 Fitzroy St, Binalong; New South Wales, Australia
- Coordinates: 34°40′16″S 148°38′07″E
- System: Regional rail
- Line: Main Southern line

History
- Opened: 1873
- Closed: 1916

Services
Preceding station	Former services	Following station
Galong towards Albury	Main Southern Line	Illalong Creek towards Sydney
Location

The Binalong railway station and telegraph office is the older of two closed railway stations in Binalong on the Main Southern railway line in New South Wales, Australia. The station opened in November 1876 as the terminus of the Bowning-Binalong section of the line. Following a fire to the original wooden building in 1883, a new stone and brick building was constructed. This was in use until 1916 when the line was deviated in conjunction with duplication. The station house and telegraph office remain today as a building of important historical significance in the town.

== History ==
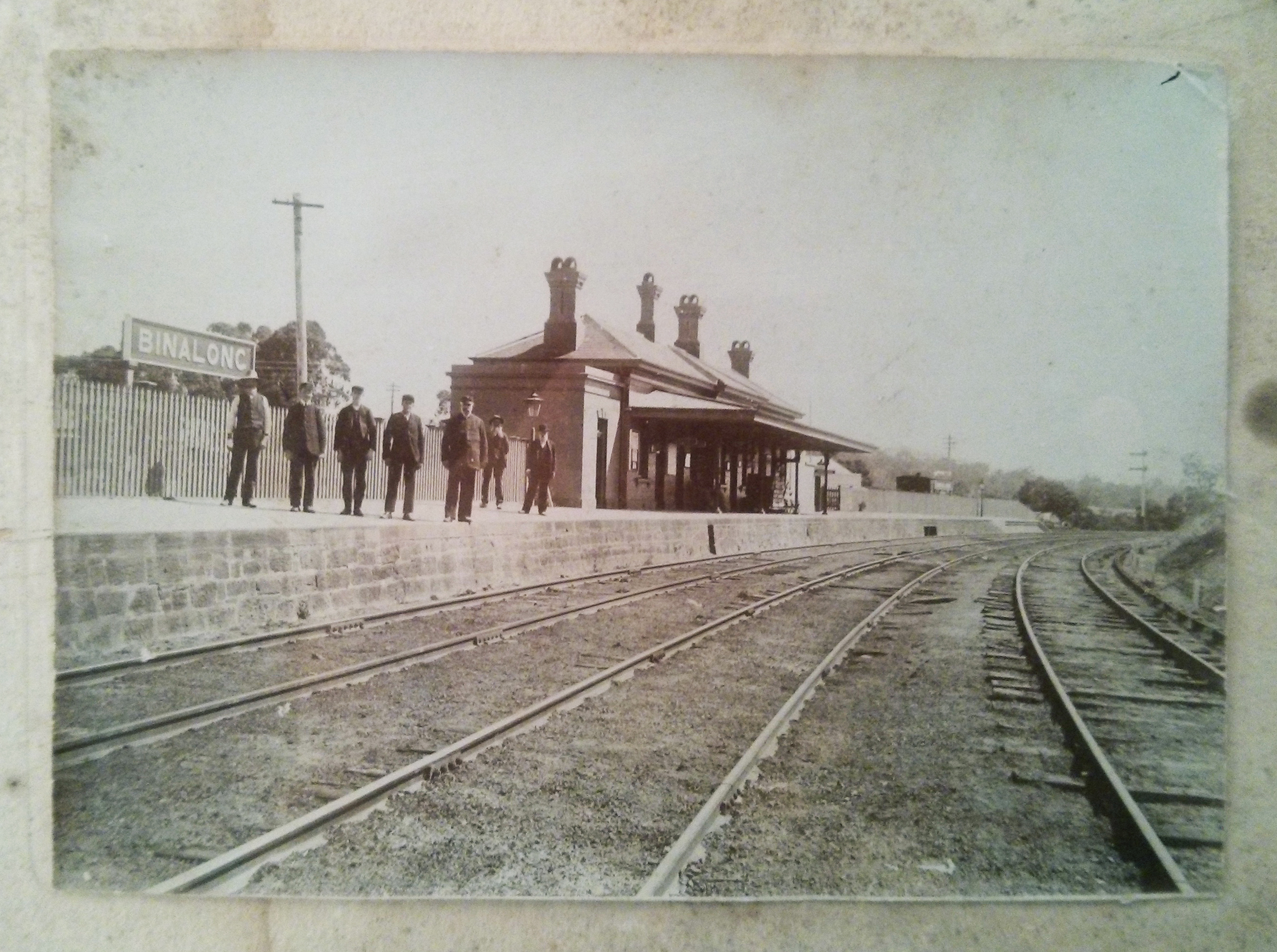
Railway staff at Binalong station

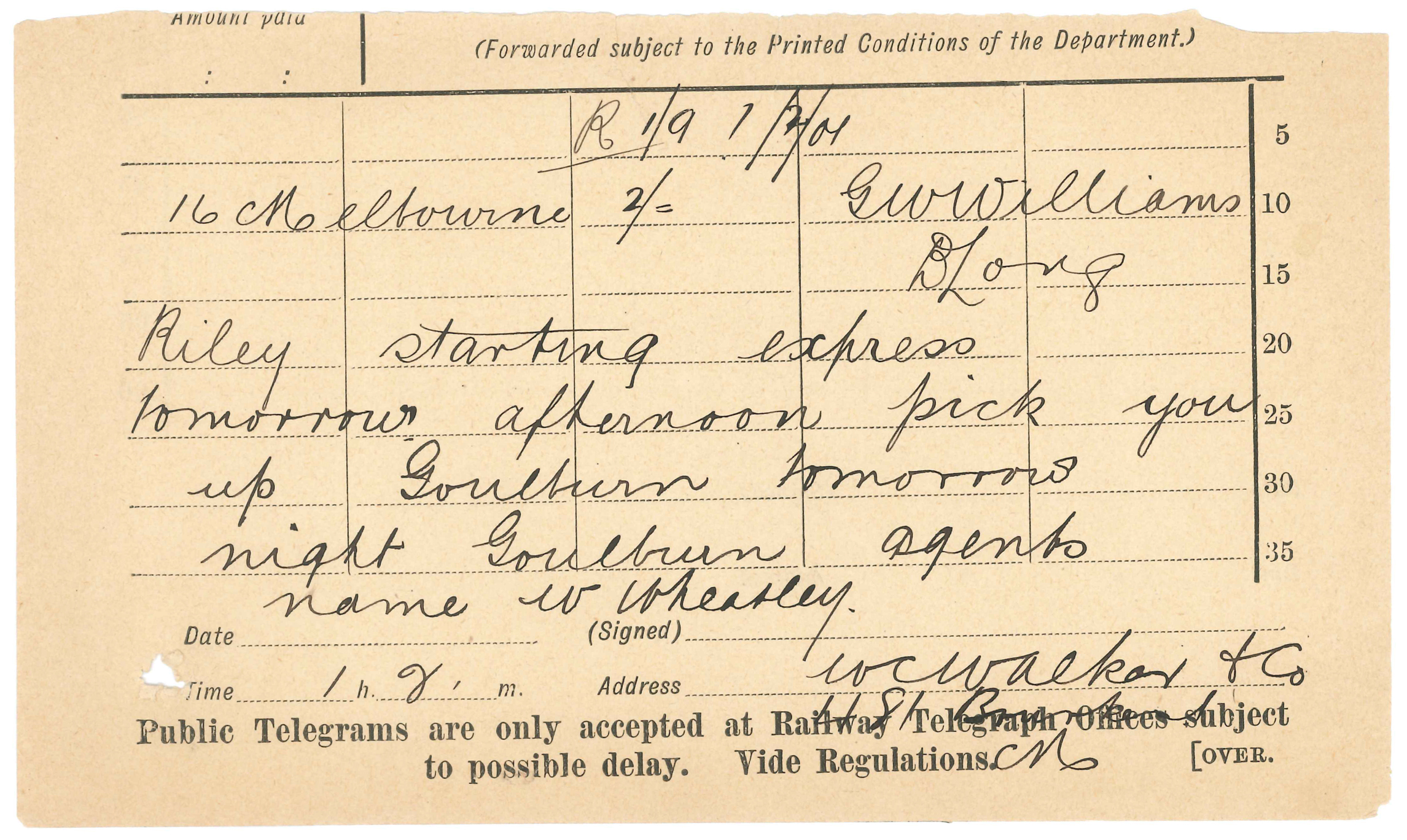
A telegram slip from Binalong telegraph office from February 1901

The southern railway or as it was known at the time 'the Great Southern Railway' was extended from Bowning to Binalong in November 1876 and then to Harden (at that time named Murrumburrah) in March 1877. The well known Amos Brothers had the contract for the extension works. The first train arrived in Binalong on Wednesday 2 November 1876 after the 14 mile stretch of track from Bowning was opened. The two engine train consisted of 20 carriages when it stopped at the contractor's camp just outside Bowning. Here Alexander Amos and his employees joined various dignitaries in a luncheon to celebrate this portion of track's completion. The train then moved on to Binalong where despite the importance of the event there was little recognition by the Binalong townsfolk. The day before, John Whitton, Engineer-in-Charge for the New South Wales Railways, inspected the track and was reportedly extremely pleased at the excellence of the work that was 'unsurpassed, if even equalled, by any other portion of the existing railways'.

== Station fire ==
On Sunday 22 April 1883, the original wooden station building was destroyed by fire. A coroner's inquest failed to find a cause of the fire despite hearing evidence from many witnesses. Special praise was given to a young fettler, William Nettleton, who bravely risked injury to save three chairs. Just over a month later Binalong was celebrating the completion of the brickwork of the new, sturdier station. George Reynolds, the bricklayer, was toasted by the attendees for his work. The celebratory atmosphere also saw toasts to the Queen, the district engineer, the inspector, the carpenters, the Press and the station master and his wife; Mr and Mrs Rae.

== Binalong train collision ==
At 4:20 a.m. on Saturday 17 April 1915 the limited express train from Melbourne collided head on with the Temora mail train which was standing at the platform. 30 passengers were injured. One passenger, Robert Thomas, was taken to Yass Hospital and later died. A coroner's inquest heard that the night officer, 27-year-old John Sylvester Cotter, on hearing the approaching express train, inadvertently lowered the signals for the wrong line, sending the express train straight into the train standing at the station instead of bypassing it on the loop. With Cotter freely admitting his mistake, the coroner's inquest found him guilty of manslaughter. He was sent to stand trial at the criminal court in Sydney, where he was found not guilty. The driver of the express from Melbourne, Henry Byrnes, was commended for his quick reaction to the impending collision in applying the brakes early. The coroner said that if any man deserved the Victoria Cross it was driver Byrnes. The driver of the Temora mail train, Alfred Spike, was also commended for managing to get his train moving in reverse and thus considerably reducing the force of the impact. Eva Rebecca Thomas, the widow of the one fatality of the incident, took the chief of the railways to court claiming £2000 in compensation. The railways admitted negligence and £1425 was awarded, to be shared by his widow and eight children.

== After decommission ==
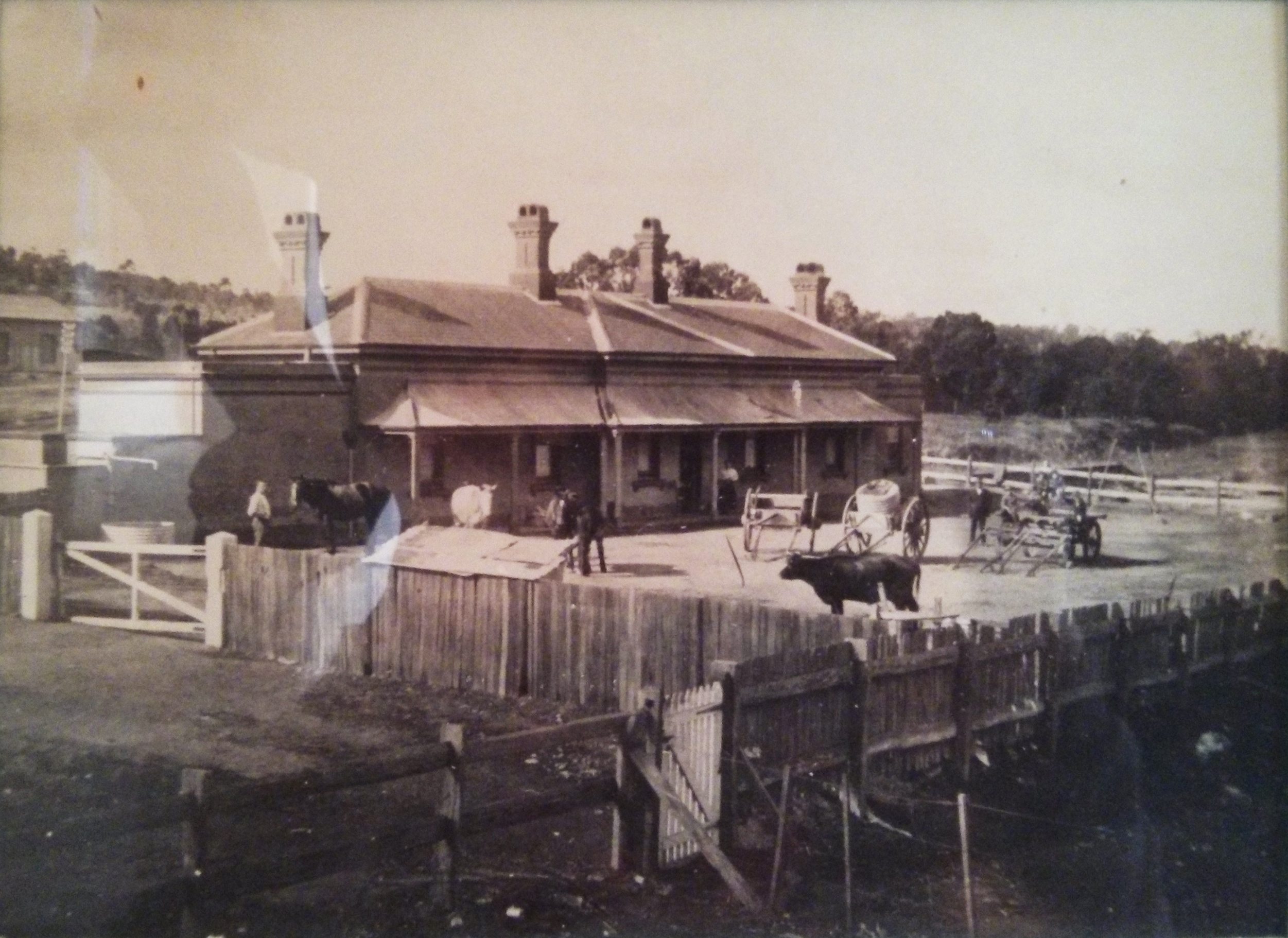
Binalong station after decommission

With the advent of longer and heavier trains and the growth in railway traffic, two tracks and easier gradients were needed on the Great Southern Railway. At many points, the line was deviated to ease gradients, particularly those against Sydney-bound goods trains, and these deviations nearly all resulted in longer, more winding alignments, which are still in use. One of the locations where an easier gradient was needed was through Binalong, and the deviation necessitated the relocation of the railway station. The original Binalong station and telegraph office was decommissioned on 22 December 1915. Since then it has been in use as a private residence and for agricultural uses. A previous owner was James Doran, who was a well known race horse trainer. Doran's horse 'The Green Isle' held the one-mile record at Victoria Park. Since the late 1970s it has had 3 different private owners who have each had a keen interest in preserving the historical aspect of the building. In the 1980s the owner of the station building acquired the brake van of the Southern Highlands Express, which is still on site today.

== See also ==
- Binalong railway station
