= Crudine Ridge Wind Farm =

Wind farm near Mudgee, Australia

- Country: Australia
- Location: Sallys Flat, New South Wales
- Coordinates: 32.966°S 149.636°E
- Status: Operational
- Commission date: 2021
- Owner: CWP Renewables

Wind farm
- Type: Onshore
- Hub height: 91.5 metres (300 ft)
- Rotor diameter: 137 metres (449 ft)

Power generation
- Units operational: 37 × 3.63 MW
- Make and model: General Electric 3.6-137
- Nameplate capacity: 134.31 MW
- Capacity factor: 33.4% (projected)
- Annual net output: 392 GWh (projected)

External links
- Website: https://cwprenewables.com/our-projects/crudine-ridge-wind-farm

Crudine Ridge Wind Farm is a 134 MW wind farm constructed and owned by CWP Renewables near Sallys Flat, 45 km south of Mudgee in New South Wales, Australia. It consists of 37 wind turbines, each rated to 3.63 MW. The towers are 91.5 metres tall, have a 137-metre rotor diameter, and a tip height of 160 metres. Commercial operations began in mid 2021. Annually, it is projected to generate 392 GWh at a capacity factor of 33.4% on average.

== Operations ==
The wind farm registered first output in December 2020 and reached full output in July 2021 and has operated continuously since then. The generation table uses eljmkt nemlog to obtain generation values for each month.

Crudine Ridge Wind Farm Generation (MWh)
Year	Total	Jan	Feb	Mar	Apr	May	Jun	Jul	Aug	Sep	Oct	Nov	Dec
2020	1,862	N/A	N/A	N/A	N/A	N/A	N/A	N/A	N/A	N/A	N/A	0	1,862*
2021	270,650	2,435*	9,957*	13,627*	14,365*	15,224*	23,749	35,931*	36,110	34,385	31,194	31,044	22,629

Note: Asterisk indicates power output was limited during the month.
