= Binalong railway station =

Former railway station in New South Wales, Australia

Binalong
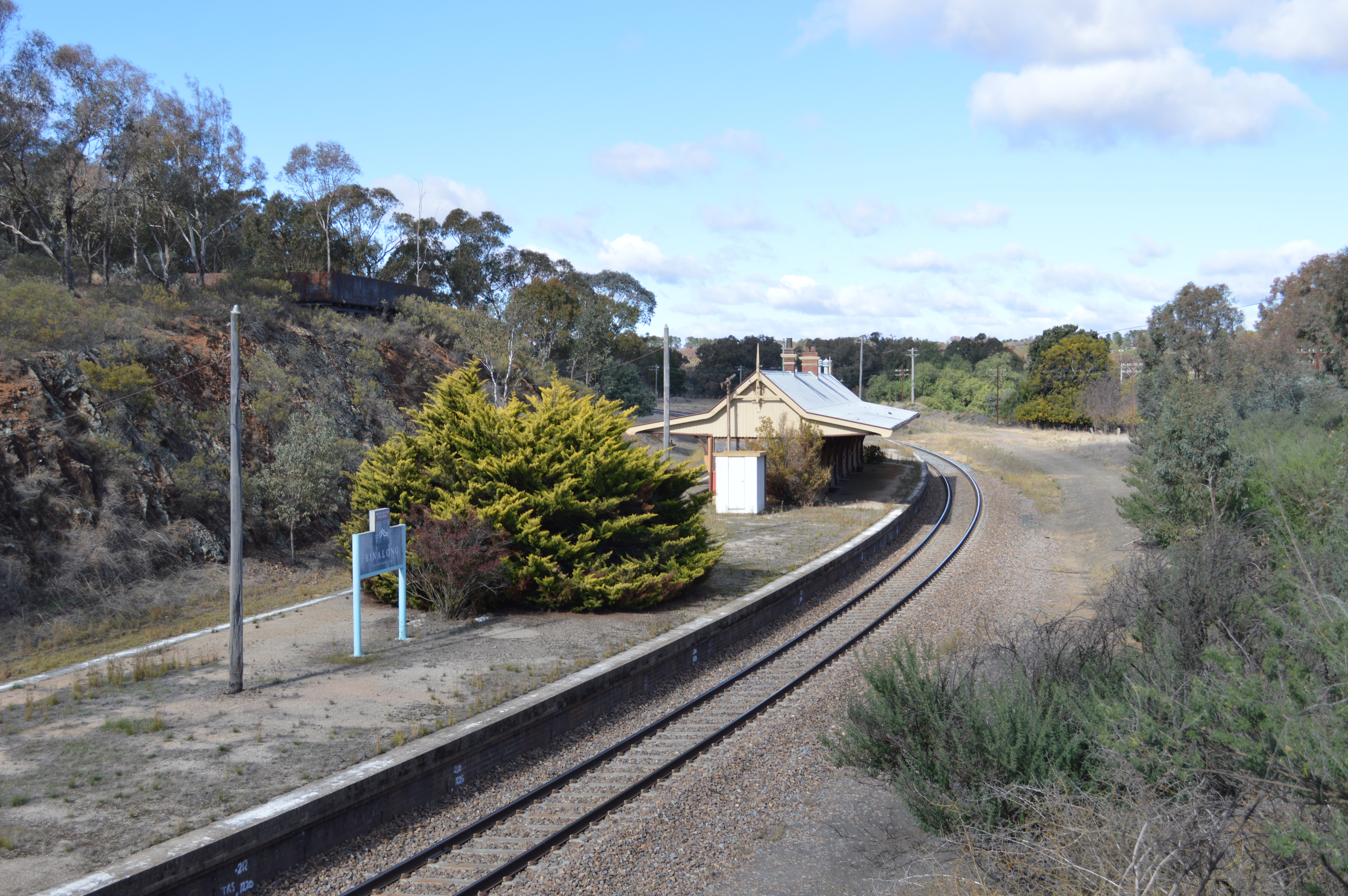
- View of the 1916 station in 2013.

General information
- Location: Binalong Boorowa Road, Binalong, New South Wales; Australia
- Coordinates: 34°40′07″S 148°38′10″E
- Operator: State Rail Authority
- Line: Main Southern
- Distance: 354.100 km from Central
- Platforms: 2 (1 island)

Construction
- Structure type: Ground

Other information
- Status: Closed

History
- Opened: 22 December 1915
- Closed: 1989

Services
Preceding station	Former services	Following station
Galong towards Albury	Main Southern Line	Illalong Creek towards Sydney
Location

Binalong railway station is a closed railway station on the Main Southern railway line, serving the village of Binalong, New South Wales, Australia. The original station opened in Binalong in November 1876 on the original rail alignment, which was bypassed with a deviation in 1916. The new island station opened on the new alignment in 1916 and is now closed to passenger services. It survives in good condition. The original station on the old alignment is in use as a private residence.

== See also ==
- Binalong railway station and telegraph office
