= Uranquinty Power Station =

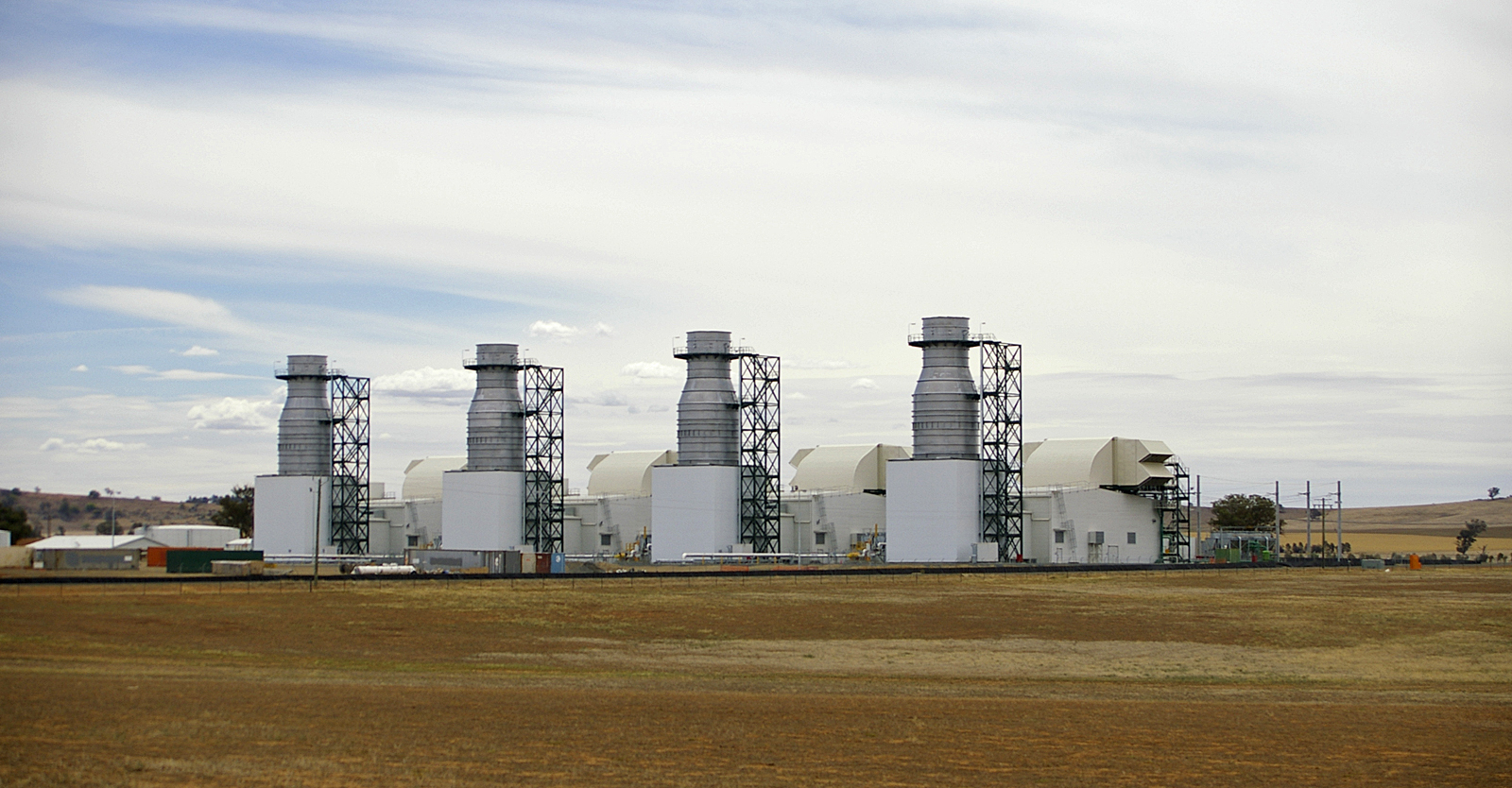
- Country: Australia
- Location: Uranquinty, New South Wales
- Coordinates: 35°10′49″S 147°13′00″E
- Status: Operational
- Commission date: January 2009
- Owner: Origin Energy

Thermal power station
- Primary fuel: Natural gas

Power generation
- Units operational: 4 (160 MW (210,000 hp) each)
- Make and model: Siemens
- Nameplate capacity: 640 MW (860,000 hp)

External links
- Commons: Related media on Commons

The Uranquinty Power Station is a 640-megawatt (860,000 hp) natural gas-fired power station located in Uranquinty, New South Wales, Australia, comprising four Siemens V94.2 gas turbines. It is the second largest gas-fired power station in New South Wales, and is used during peak loads.

Uranquinty Power Station was the fourth power station to be constructed by NewGen Power which was jointly owned by ERM Power and Babcock & Brown Power at a cost of $500 million.

On 4 July 2008 Babcock & Brown Power announced that it had sold the Uranquinty power station for $700 million to Origin Energy.

On 19 January 2009 Origin Energy announced that the Uranquinty Power Station was commissioned with eight people employed to operate the facility.

== See also ==
- List of power stations in New South Wales
