= Cullerin Range Wind Farm =

Wind farm in New South Wales, Australia

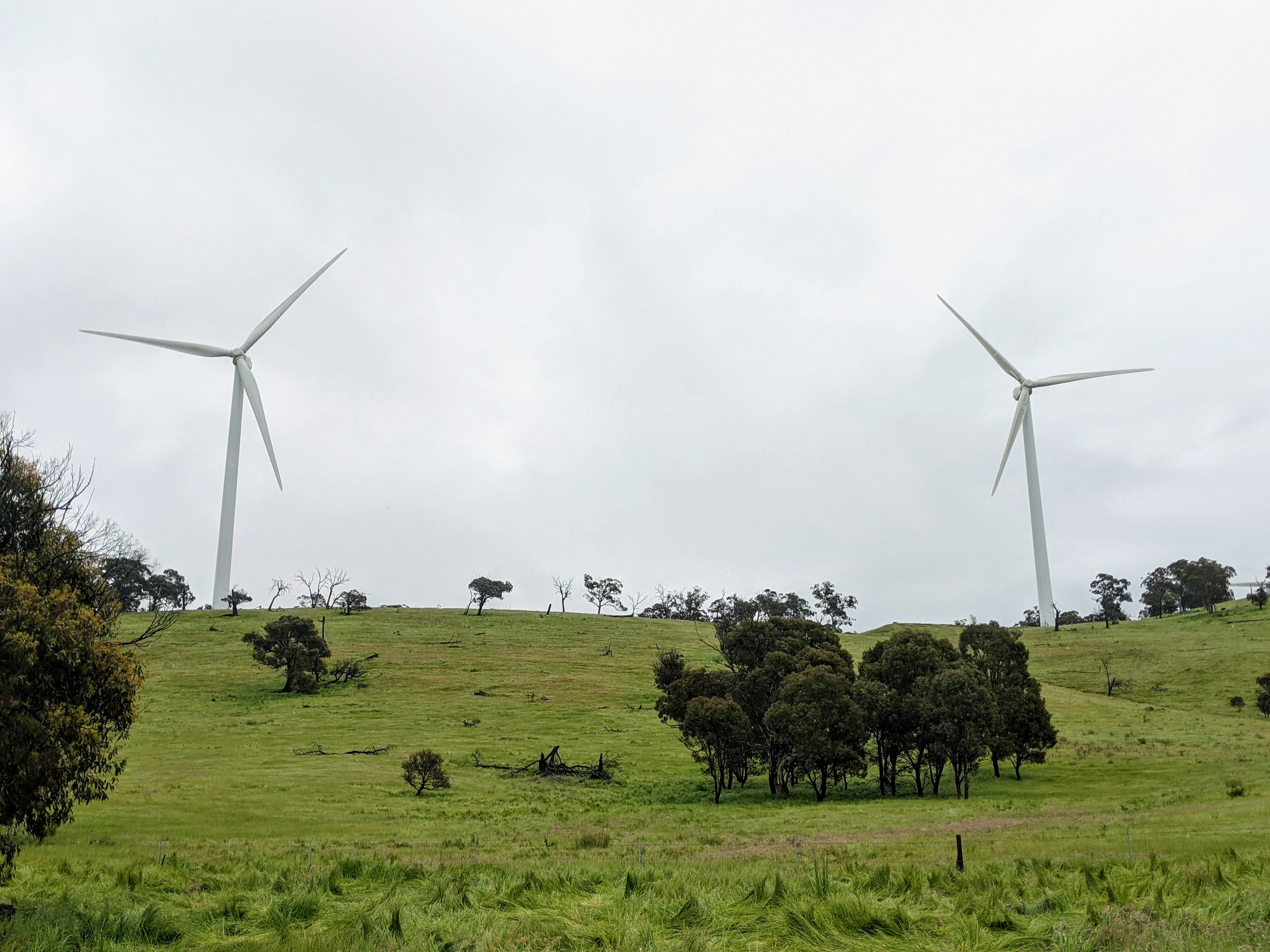
- Cullerin Range Wind Farm from the eastern side of the Cullerin Range
- Location of Cullerin Range Wind Farm in New South Wales
- Country: Australia
- Location: Breadalbane; Cullerin
- Coordinates: 34.814°S 149.396°E
- Status: Operational
- Construction began: 2007
- Commission date: 2009
- Construction cost: A$90 million
- Owner: Energy Developments

Wind farm
- Type: Onshore
- Hub height: 80 metres (262 ft)
- Rotor diameter: 82 metres (269 ft); 92 metres (302 ft)

Power generation
- Units operational: 8 × 2 MW; 7 × 2.05 MW
- Make and model: Senvion MM82; Senvion MM92
- Nameplate capacity: 30 MW

External links
- Website: edlenergy.com/project/cullerin-range/

The 30 megawatt Cullerin Range Wind Farm is located in the localities of Cullerin and Breadalbane in the Upper Lachlan Shire, New South Wales, Australia. The wind farm was completed in 2009 and cost around $90 million. The owner, Origin Energy, sold the business to Energy Developments, a subsidiary of Duet.

== Incidents ==
On 5 January 2023, at about 6 a.m., an electrical fire broke out in the generator cabin of one turbine. Local NSW Rural Fire Service firefighters attended the scene, to ensure that burning debris did not cause a fire on the ground. The three blades had been stopped with one vertical and that was consumed by the fire.

== See also ==
- Gunning Wind Farm
- Wind power in Australia
- List of wind farms in New South Wales
