= Taralga Wind Farm =

Wind farm in New South Wales, Australia

- Country: Australia
- Location: Near Taralga, New South Wales
- Coordinates: 34.4271°S 149.8576°E
- Status: Operational
- Construction began: September 2013
- Commission date: Mid 2015
- Construction cost: A$280 million
- Owner: State Power Investment Corp
- Operator: CWP Renewables

Wind farm
- Type: Onshore
- Hub height: 80 metres (262 ft)
- Rotor diameter: 90 metres (295 ft); 100 metres (328 ft)
- Site elevation: 910 metres

Power generation
- Units operational: 21 × 2.0 MW; 21 × 1.8 MW; 9 × 3.0 MW
- Make and model: Vestas V90-2.0MW; Vestas V100-1.8MW; Vestas V90-3.0MW
- Nameplate capacity: 106.8 MW
- Capacity factor: 32.28% (average 2016-2020)
- Annual net output: 302 GWh (average 2016-2020)

External links
- Website: www.pacificblue.com.au/our-energy-production/operating-sites/taralga-wind-farm/

The Taralga Wind Farm is a wind farm located near Taralga, New South Wales. Owned by Pacific Blue, it commenced operation in 2015.

Taralga Wind Farm was CBD Energy/Santander's first and only wind farm. It is a 106.8 megawatt wind farm with 51 turbines. The energy produced by the wind farm can power around 45,000 average Australian households per year, saving over 258,000 tonnes of greenhouse gas emissions per year.

== Location ==
The Taralga Wind Farm is near Taralga.

== Timeline ==
On 20 February 2012, approval was granted by the government of New South Wales for work to commence on the Taralga Wind Farm, after the approval of the Stage 1 CEMP. The project consists of 51 wind turbines generating 106.8 Megawatts of electricity on ridges to the east of Taralga. Electricity generated by the project will be fed into the national power grid through a 37.5 km transmission line to Marulan Substation.

The project created up to 200 local jobs during the construction phase. Approval of the wind farm followed an unsuccessful challenge by the Taralga Landscape Guardians in the Land and Environment Court of New South Wales to block the project on the grounds of aesthetic and environmental impacts including noise emissions and blighting of the landscape. Chief Justice Brian Preston ruled in favour of approving the wind farm as the long-term benefit of reduced greenhouse gas emissions was in the greater public interest. In June 2015, the wind farm was fully commissioned and commenced commercial operations. The layout of the wind farm can be seen through this link.

In March 2015, the Chinese state-owned utility State Power Investment Corp agreed to purchase the Wind Farm for a reported A$300 million, which includes the A$200 million debt facility from the CBD Energy (now BlueNRGY) and Banco Santander subsidiary Capital Riesgo joint venture.

As of August 2016 the project was operated under an O&M contract with Vestas Australia, with Wind Prospect / CWP acting as asset managers.

== Funding ==
To help fund the construction of the wind farm, CBD Energy/Santander signed a A$200 million project finance debt facility agreement with ANZ, CEFC, and EKF. The project had off-take backing from EnergyAustralia The total project cost was A$280 million.

== Operations ==
The wind farm began grid commissioning in December 2014 and reached full output in July 2015 and has operated continuously since then. The generation table uses eljmkt nemlog to obtain generation values for each month.

Taralga Wind Farm Generation (MWh)
Year	Total	Jan	Feb	Mar	Apr	May	Jun	Jul	Aug	Sep	Oct	Nov	Dec
2014	1,834	N/A	N/A	N/A	N/A	N/A	N/A	N/A	N/A	N/A	N/A	N/A	1,834*
2015	219,430	6,237*	5,993*	11,950*	13,024*	20,423*	14,382*	31,897	34,421	19,168	22,959	20,562	18,414
2016	318,480	17,309	13,246	12,180	12,716	45,007	33,133	40,319	26,627	28,697	41,827	23,462	23,957
2017	291,587	21,822	18,912	16,330	13,517	17,780	15,305	43,412	37,790	45,278	19,473	13,241	28,727
2018	299,383	19,557	17,018	19,435	17,990	29,260	27,049	42,007	41,402	24,603	20,004	23,740	17,318
2019	312,021	16,489	16,257	20,909	15,721	30,528	20,116	37,777	37,695	29,488	23,993	35,632	27,416
2020	288,735	19,621	20,795	17,089	30,067	24,518	22,239	22,983	40,801	29,118	24,366	16,695	20,443
2021		20,241	13,589	25,640	20,241	23,335	29,065	31,064	35,415	34,735			

Note: Asterisk indicates power output was limited during the month.

== See also ==
- Wind power in Australia
- List of wind farms in New South Wales
