= Illalong =

Former railway station in New South Wales, Australia

Illalong is a rural locality just off the Burley Griffin Way in south New South Wales.

Illalong is in Yass Valley Council located at 34°41′54″S 148°45′04″ E, and 5.3 km away from the village of Binalong. and 80 km from Canberra. Illalong, is outside of Yass, New South Wales, just off the Hume Highway and the Sydney to Melbourne Railway Line.

Illalong is also a Parish cadastral parish of Harden County New South Wales. The parish of Illalong is between Binalong, New South Wales and Bowning, New South Wales

Illalong Creek near Binalong is also a railway station on the Main Southern railway line, New South Wales, and is at an altitude of about 448m above sea level.

Preceding station	Former services	Following station
Binalong towards Albury	Main Southern Line	Goondah towards Sydney
