= Kangiara =

- Town
- Interactive map of Kangiara
- Coordinates: 34°36′11.0″S 148°45′25.0″E
- Country: Australia
- State: New South Wales
- Region: Southern Tablelands
- LGA: Yass Valley Shire
- Location: 310 km (190 mi) SW of Sydney; 21 km (13 mi) S of Boorowa; 32 km (20 mi) NW of Yass; 69 km (43 mi) SE of Young

Government
  - State electorate: Goulburn
  - Federal division: Riverina
- Elevation: 598 m (1,962 ft)

Population
  - Total: 50 (SAL 2021)
- Postcode: 2582
- County: King
- Parish: Taunton
Localities around Kangiara
Binalong	Boorowa	Rye Park
Binalong	Kangiara	Blakney Creek
Bookham	Bowning	Bango

Kangiara (/kæŋdʒiɑːrə/) is a locality, in the Yass Valley Council local government area, within the Southern Tablelands of New South Wales, Australia. There was once a mining village of the same name.

== History ==
=== Aboriginal and early settler history ===
The area now known as Kangiara lies on the traditional lands of Ngunnawal people. Kangiara is probably a settler rendering of an Aboriginal word, said to mean "a deep hole."

The area was included in the Nineteen Counties, in which colonial settlement was permitted by the colonial authorities. Desirable grazing land was taken up near Yass during the 1820s. The area now known as Kangiara had the advantage of lying near the Boorowa River.

Kangiara Station was a sheep grazing run in the area. It was settled by the Besnard family—probably by 1835, but by 1839, at the latest—and was a well-established operation by the end of the 1840s. It fronted Boorowa River and lay west of modern-day Lachlan Valley Way. It is likely that the locality took its name from this landholding.

All Saints Anglican Church (Tangmangaroo) dates from 1889.

=== Mining ===
The area is part of the mineral-rich Lachlan Fold Belt. A mine that produced copper, lead, silver, and gold—Kangiara Copper Mine—operated from 1907 to 1918, although small scale mining appears to have occurred at Kangiara at least as early as 1903. In 1909, there were other mines working in the area, including the South Kangiara, North Kangiara, and the Kangiara Extended.

In 1911, two miners were killed in a blasting accident at the mine, another was seriously injured and died later in hospital. In 1912, a miner was killed in an accident.

During the 1920s, a flotation process plant was erected to process mine tailings—mainly to recover zinc—and two shafts were sunk in the area around Kangiara.

From 1952 to 1958, mining was revived by Lake George Mines, which also mined at Captains Flat. The main mine site was remediated in 1977, with further work done to address contaminated seepage in 1994. The area remains of interest for mining exploration.

The mines at Kangiara were a well known source of interesting mineral specimens, particularly Pyromorphite but also Malachite.

=== Mining village ===
The village that grew as a result of the mining was situated just to the east of Lachlan Valley Way, opposite the mine site on the west side of that road. The village was near the intersection of the main road with modern-day Kangiara Road, a part of which was once called Park Road within the area of the village.

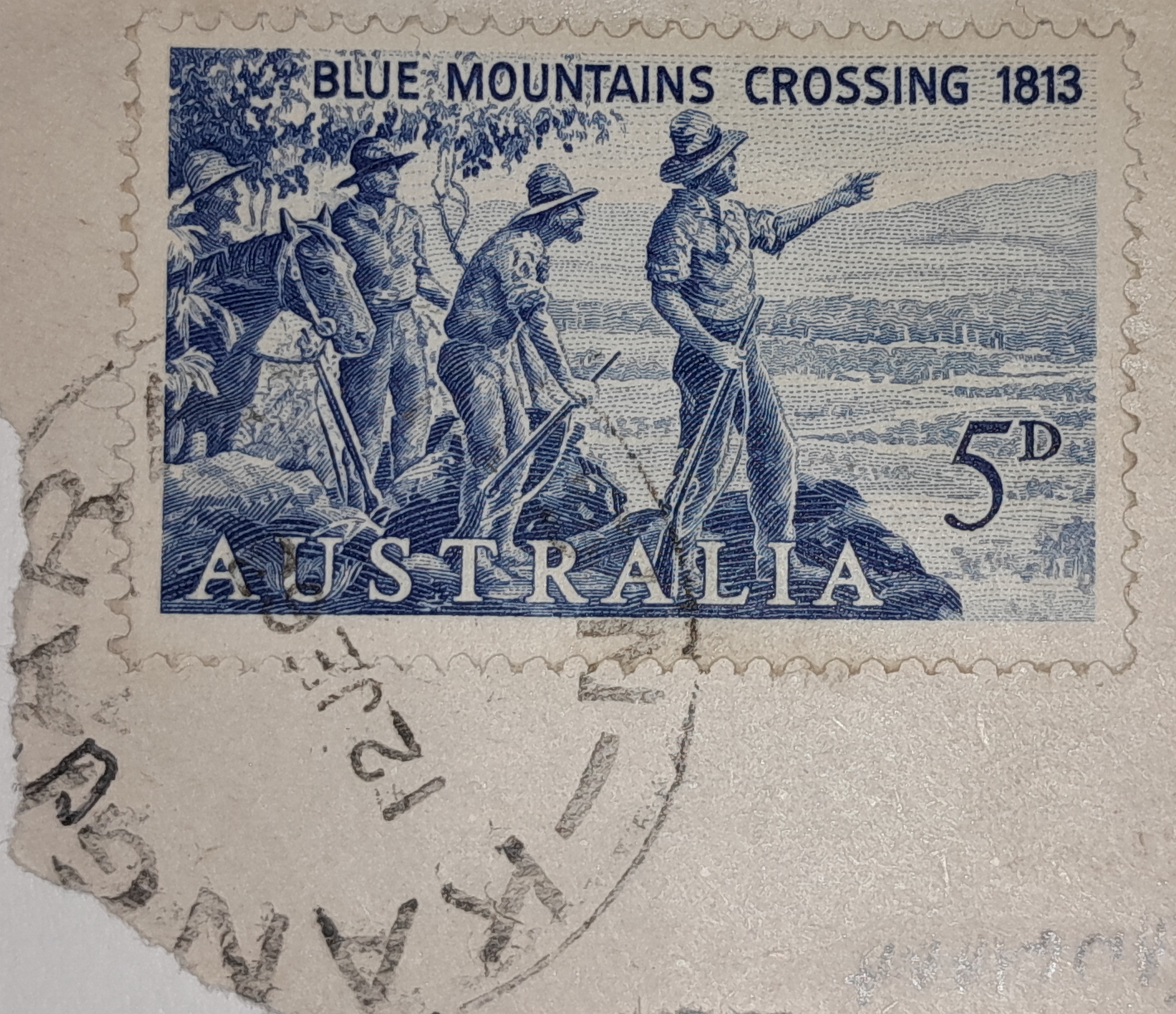
Postmark.

Kangiara was proclaimed a village in September 1909. In 1910, population had reached 500 and a licence for a hotel was granted. There was a public school, known as Kangiara Mines, there from 1910 to 1958. The village had a post office, known as Kangiara Mines until 1923, from 1909 to 1971, and a police station. The village had land allocated for a cemetery in 1909, but it remains uncertain that it was ever used; burials of Kangiara residents seem to have taken place at nearby Boorawa, Yass, or at All Saints Anglican Church (Tangmangaroo).

The First World War caused a slowing of mining, as much of the mine's output had previously gone to Germany. By 1915, the village had a Catholic church and a bakery, but its 14 occupied dwellings were described as "scattered" and deteriorating due to mainly being "built in primitive fashion, with iron roof and hessian walls." The village was in decline by the late 1930s but revived somewhat in the 1950s.

== Present day ==
Kangiara was assigned as the name of the locality in 1975. It is a quiet locality, with grazing the main occupation.

Part of the locality includes the Bango Wind Farm, a wind farm. Its construction began in August 2019 and it became fully operational in 2023. The absence of any significant population centres in the area was one factor in the project's approval.

Today all that remains of the mining village and its mine are the former general store and some houses in what is still known as Charles Street, some mine ruins and denuded land, and—perhaps—the village's cemetery. To the south-east, 5.5km from the old village's site, is the Tangmangaroo Anglican church (All Saints) and its cemetery.

The mine site is now greatly altered following rehabilitation work in 1977. Subsequently, the mine site was identified as one leaking acid water, in the form of seepage from mine waste. The seepage contains copper, lead, zinc, manganese and cadmium. In 1994, further rehabilitation works were carried out at a cost of $95,000. These included, "anoxic limestone drains, construction of diversion banks and a sediment dam, diversion of clean water around the site and revegetation". The unusual colour of the water, in the sediment dam near the old mine site, is thus also a result of mining activity.
