= Origin Energy =

Australian energy company

Origin Energy Ltd
- Type: Public
- Traded as: ASX: ORG; S&P/ASX 200 component
- Industry: Energy
- Founded: February 2000, but parts of the business date from the 20th century
- Headquarters: Barangaroo; Sydney, New South Wales, Australia
- Key people: Frank Calabria (CEO) (MD)
- Products: Electricity, natural gas, solar panels, LPG, hot water, heating and cooling, electric vehicle charging, broadband
- Revenue: ▼ A$12.097 billion (2021)
- Net income: ▼ A$-2.289 billion (2021)
- Owner: AustralianSuper (17%)
- Website: originenergy.com.au

Origin Energy Ltd is an ASX listed public company with headquarters in Sydney. It is a major integrated electricity generator, and electricity and natural gas retailer. Origin operates Australia's largest coal-fired power station, Eraring Power Station in New South Wales, which it is expected to close in 2029. As of 2024, it plans to "minimise" its ownership of wind and solar power, to boost investor returns. It owns 20% of Octopus Energy, a UK renewable energy retailer.

== History ==
Origin Energy was formed 18 February 2000, as a result of a spin-off from Boral. SAGASCO (formerly known as the South Australian Gas Company) became part of Origin Energy as part of the demerger.

Between 2001 and 2002, Origin acquired a Victorian electricity retailer licence from distributors Powercor and CitiPower. In 2004, the SEAGas pipeline was completed, linking the Victorian and South Australian gas markets. During this time, Origin obtained 50% interest in the Kupe Gas Field and Edison Mission Energy's 51.4% interest in New Zealand's Contact Energy. Origin sold its 53% shareholding in Contact Energy to the market in 2015.

On 27 November 2006, the Government of Queensland announced the sale of Sun Retail, the former retailing arm of Energex to Origin for $1.202 billion.

On 15 December 2010, Origin Energy announced that it would purchase the retail divisions of Country Energy and Integral Energy from the Government of New South Wales, at a total cost of A$3.25 billion, as well as entering a GenTrader agreement with Eraring Energy (in which Origin supplies fuel, pays certain charges, and can dispatch and sell electricity output, while Eraring Energy owns, operates and maintains the power stations). The transaction was completed on 1 March 2011.

In June 2022, it was announced that Origin had been fined $17 million for breaching its obligations to customers experiencing hardship and payment difficulties.

In August 2022, the company announced a goal for net-zero direct and indirect emissions by 2050.

In November 2022, Origin received a takeover offer from a Brookfield Asset Management and EIG Global Energy Partners consortium for A$18 billion. Origin agreed to the offer in March 2023, which sees its energy market business owned by Brookfield and its partners, while EIG's MidOcean Energy owns Origin's integrated gas business. In October 2023, the takeover was approved by the Australian Competition and Consumer Commission. The acquisition was terminated in December 2023 after Origin shareholders led by its largest investor, AustralianSuper, opposed the deal, failing to meet the required 75% threshold.

In November 2025, Origin entered into an agreement to acquire the retail energy business of Energy Locals.

On the 6th of February 2026, Origin acquired 1st Energy.

== Core business ==
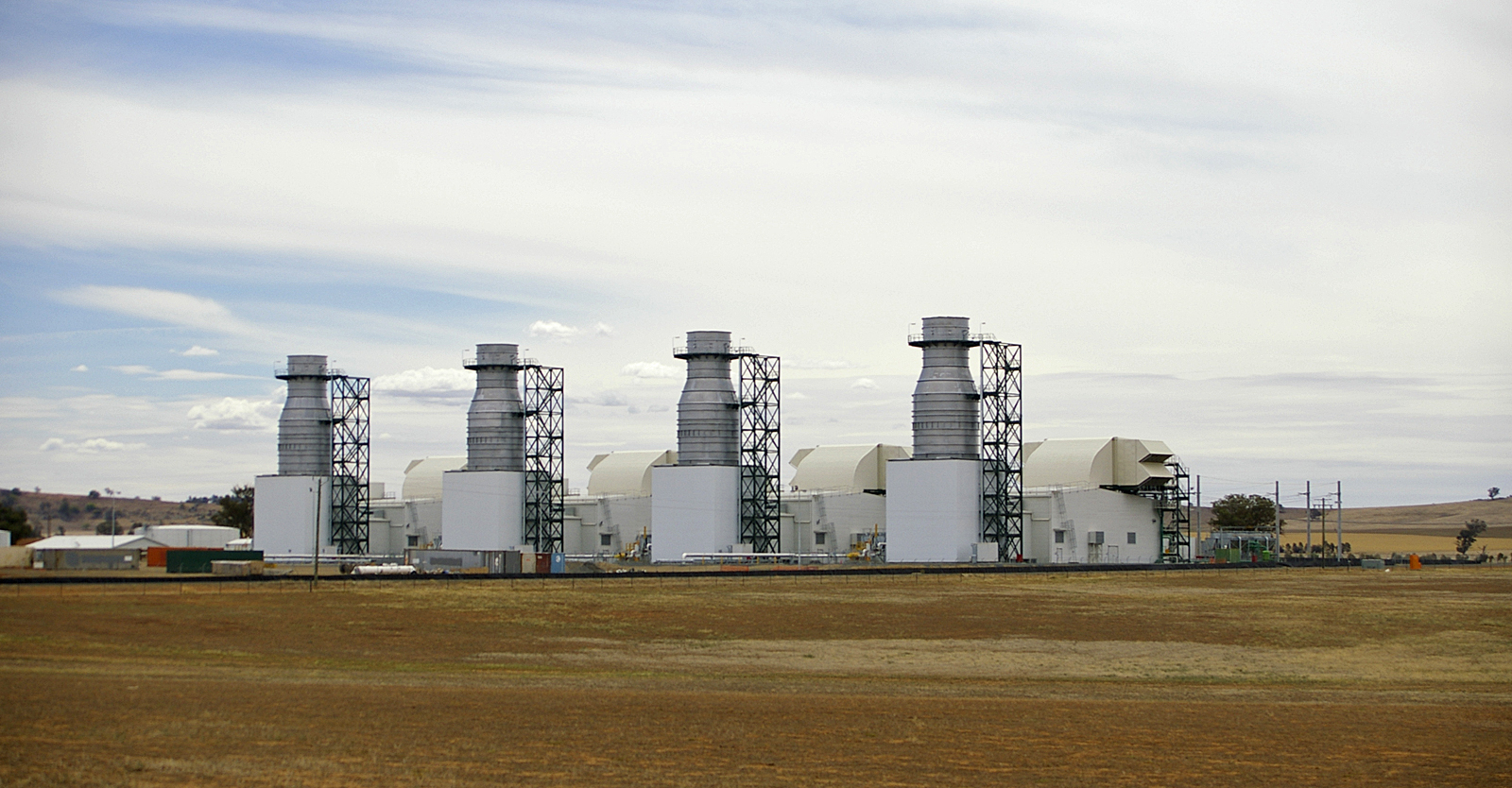
Uranquinty Power Station (Natural gas)

=== Natural gas exploration and production ===
The company's portfolio includes the Bowen and Surat Basins in Queensland and the Browse Basin in Western Australia. In 2017, Origin sold its subsidiary Lattice Energy and its conventional upstream oil and gas business to Beach Energy for $1,585 million.

=== Australia Pacific LNG, Queensland, Australia ===
Australia Pacific LNG (APLNG) is an incorporated company owned by Origin Energy, US giant ConocoPhillips and China's Sinopec. The project consists of development of Australia Pacific LNG's gas fields in the Surat and Bowen Basins, construction of a 530 km gas transmission pipeline from the gas fields to an LNG facility on Curtis Island and construction of an LNG facility on Curtis Island.

On 26 October 2017, gas producer and exporter APLNG entered into a sales agreement with Origin Energy, to supply 41 petajoules of gas under a 14-month contract starting 1 November. The contract brings the company's total commitment to 186 PJ for 2018, representing almost 30% of Australian east coast domestic gas market demand.

=== Energy retailing ===
Origin has approximately 4.217 million customers, servicing both large energy customers and the residential and small business market.

=== Electricity generation ===
Origin operates is able to generate 6,010 MW of electricity capacity. This represents approximately 13 per cent of power generation capacity in the National Electricity Market.

Power station	State	Location	Capacity MW	Peak/base	Commissioned	Fuel	Notes
Darling Downs Power Station	Queensland	Dalby	644	Baseload	2010	coal seam gas from the Surat Basin	
Roma Power Station	Queensland	Roma	80	Peaking	1999	Gas	built by Boral
Mortlake Power Station	Victoria	12 km west of Mortlake	566	Peaking	2012	Otway Basin gas	Largest gas-fired power station in Victoria
Ladbroke Grove Power Station	South Australia	Penola	80	Peaking	2000	Natural gas	
Quarantine Power Station	South Australia	Torrens Island	224	Peaking	2000 (enlarged in 2009)	Gas	
Uranquinty Power Station	New South Wales	Uranquinty	664	Peaking	2009	Gas	
Eraring Power Station	New South Wales	Dora Creek	2880	Baseload	1982	Coal	Australia's largest power station
Mount Stuart Power Station	Queensland	Stuart, Townsville	423	Peaking	1999	Kerosene	North Queensland's largest power station. Open-cycle gas turbine
Shoalhaven Hydro Pump Storage Scheme	New South Wales	Kangaroo Valley and Bendeela	240	Peaking		two pumped storage hydropower stations Water	
Osborne Cogeneration Plant	South Australia	Osborne	180	Baseload and peak			jointly owned by Origin and ATCO Power
Worsley Cogeneration Plant	Western Australia	Worsley	60				provides steam and power to the Worsley Alumina Refinery. Jointly owned by Origin and Verve Energy
Dandenong Cogeneration Plant	Victoria	Dandenong	120			gas	In partnership with Places Victoria, Australia's first urban distributed energy precinct
Bendigo and Ballarat Solar Parks	Victoria	Ballarat and Bendigo	0.300		2009	Solar	generate a total of 710 MWh of power per year

== Controversies ==
=== Whistleblower allegations ===
In January 2017, The Guardian reported allegations of whistleblower Sally McDow, a former compliance manager at Origin. She claimed that the company had ignored various wellfield integrity problems, including failing to maintain hundreds of wells across Australia and New Zealand, failing to seal wells after their active lives and failing to report incidents internally or to the appropriate regulators. She also described a culture of bullying and harassment within the organisation. She said that she had advised the CEO at the time, and Grant King (then President of the Business Council of Australia) but that King did not want the incidents reported. He allegedly stated that the incidents could be used by opponents of the unconventional gas industry to delay or halt current or future projects. Origin denied the allegations.

=== Beetaloo Basin fracking ===
Origin was approved by the Northern Territory government to start fracking in August 2019 and drilling commenced in October 2019. Fracking began in September 2020 following a six-month COVID-19-induced stand down. Origin postponed production at their Kyalla well site to the second half of 2021 due to the COVID-19 pandemic.

Concerns were expressed by local officials on the fracking operation, fearing that it could affect their ability to get groundwater and stating the local officials did not fully understand the contracts they were signing with petroleum companies. Accusations that Origin did not consult with traditional landowners before starting their planned exploration were refuted by the Northern Land Council which stated it understood the text in the contracts and consulted with traditional Aboriginal landowners. Origin stated that it conducted multiple checks when installing a well and that fracking stops if a check fails.

Origin divested from projects in the Beetaloo Basin in the Northern Territory in 2022.

=== Misleading information and prohibited fees ===
In December 2020, Origin was fined $126,000 after the Australian Competition and Consumer Commission issued an infringement for misleading information regarding price increases in a letter sent out to Victorian customers in December 2019. Origin stated in the letter that electricity prices were changing because of the Victorian Essential Services Commission's increase to the Victorian Default Offer, an unrelated price set by the Essential Services Commission. However, the ACCC stated that the price increase was entirely Origin's choice and they chose to increase prices.

In October 2021 Origin was fined $5 million for charging 22,371 customers prohibited exit fees totaling $489,774. Origin received complaints about the fees in 2018 but continued charging them until 2020. The Essential Services Commission stated "Origin Energy knew at all times about the changes in the law banning exit fees and they even reviewed 19 different contract templates but didn’t remove the exit fees". By October 2021 fewer than half the wrongly charged exit fees had been reimbursed.

=== Pollution ===
In September 2022 Origin Energy pleaded guilty to releasing nearly 800,000 litres of polluted water from its coal seam gas operations in Queensland's Western Downs region, north-west of Brisbane. According to the Department of Environment and Science, heavy rain caused water to overflow from coal seam gas tanks into a nearby waterway, including a landholder's dam.

=== 2026 customer data breach ===
In July 2026, Origin Energy confirmed that some customer data had been accessed and disclosed without authorisation, following reporting by The Australian about a possible breach. The company said it was still investigating how many customers were affected.
