= Gunning Wind Farm =

Wind farm in New South Wales, Australia

- Country: Australia
- Location: Cullerin Range
- Coordinates: 34°48′48″S 149°24′00″E
- Status: Operational
- Construction began: April 2010
- Commission date: May 2011
- Construction cost: A$147m
- Owner: Acciona Energy
- Operator: Acciona Energía

Wind farm
- Type: Onshore
- Hub height: 80 metres (262 ft)
- Rotor diameter: 77 metres (253 ft) and 82 metres (269 ft)

Power generation
- Units operational: 31 × 1.5 MW
- Make and model: Unknown (31)
- Nameplate capacity: 46.5 MW

External links
- Website: https://www.acciona.no/projects/energy/wind-power/gunning-wind-farm/
- Commons: Related media on Commons

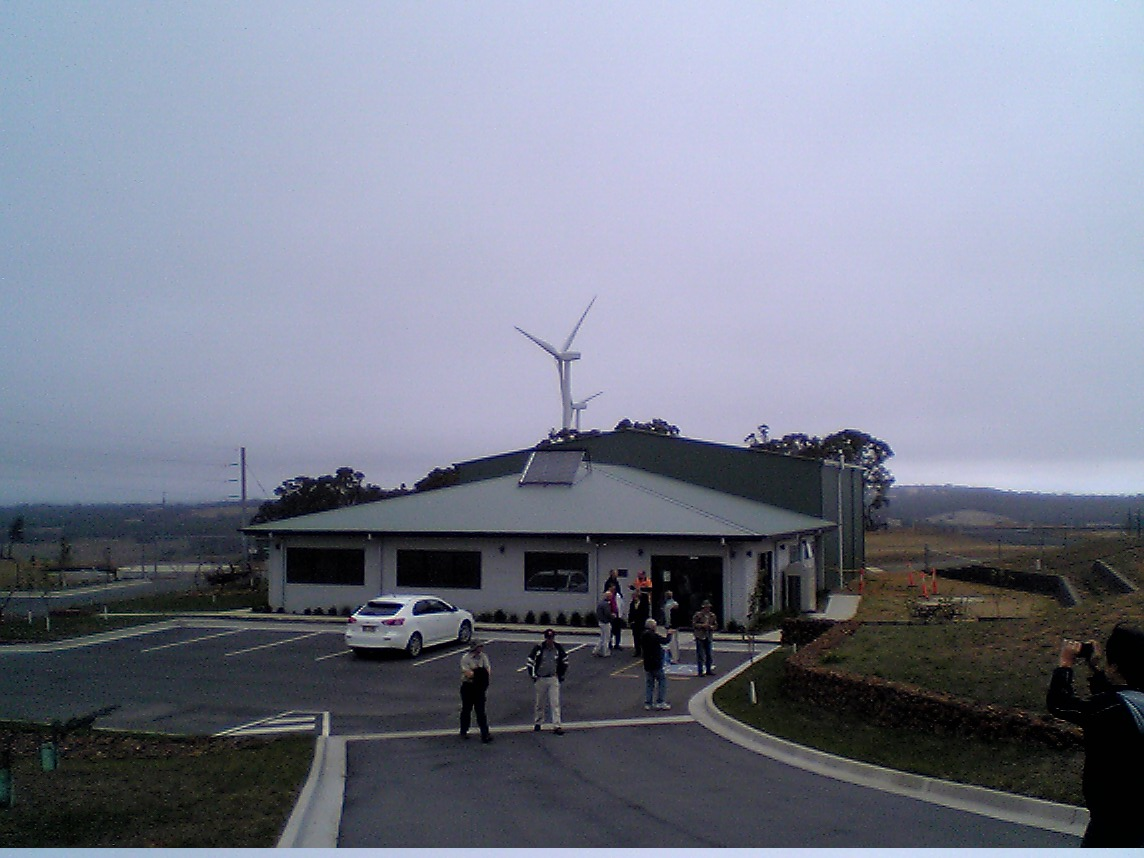
The control building for the Gunning Wind Farm

The Gunning Wind Farm project is a wind farm development in the Cullerin Range, north-east of Gunning, in New South Wales. Wind turbines in the farm are visible from the Hume Highway.

The Gunning Wind Farm comprises an electrical substation and operation and maintenance facilities plus 31 turbines which send power to the substation via 17 km of underground cabling. A 14 km-long 132 kV transmission line was constructed to connect the wind farm to the 132 kV Yass-Goulburn transmission line. Turbines generate electricity at 12 kV which travels via underground cables to the substation where it is stepped up to 132 kV to match the grid voltage. Construction began in April, 2010 and created about 100 jobs, bringing significant economic activity to the Gunning region. The wind farm was completed in May, 2011. A great deal of work was done prior to development of the wind farm. Technical studies identified constraints and the best design, with independent consultants engaged to report on:

- flora and fauna
- cultural heritage
- traffic and transport
- geology and hydrology
- landscape and visual amenity
- sound

The wind farm is capable of producing 46.5 MW of clean, renewable energy. Each of the 1.5 MW turbines at the Gunning Wind Farm can provide sufficient renewable energy to power approximately 750 homes when the wind is blowing and save more than 5,250 tonnes of greenhouse gas emissions a year. The 31 turbines can power 35,000 homes annually when the wind is blowing and save more than 162,750 tonnes of greenhouse gases a year.

== See also ==
- Cullerin Range Wind Farm
