= Crookwell Wind Farm =

Wind farm in New South Wales, Australia

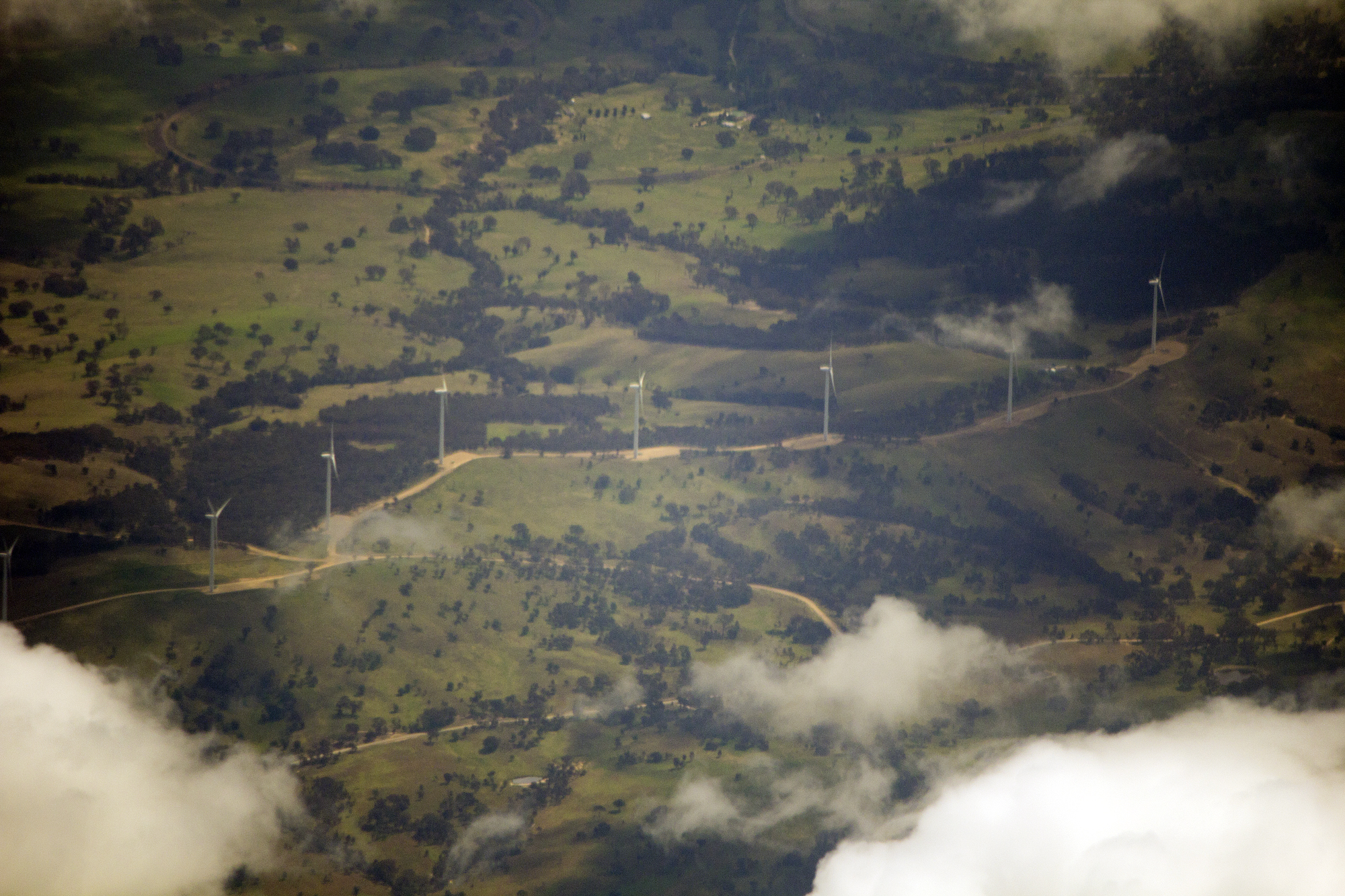
- Country: Australia
- Location: Crookwell, New South Wales
- Coordinates: 34.5165°S 149.54248°E
- Status: Operational
- Commission date: 1998
- Owner: Tilt Renewables

Wind farm
- Type: Onshore
- Hub height: 45 metres (148 ft)
- Rotor diameter: 44 metres (144 ft)

Power generation
- Units operational: 8 × 600 kW
- Make and model: Vestas V44-600kW
- Nameplate capacity: 4.8 MW
- Annual net output: 8 GWh

External links
- Website: https://www.tiltrenewables.com/assets-and-projects/Crookwell-Wind-Farm/
- Commons: Related media on Commons

Crookwell Wind Farm, located at Crookwell west of Goulburn, New South Wales, consists of eight 600 kW wind turbines giving a total capacity of 4.8 MW. It was the first grid-connected wind farm in Australia when built by Pacific Power in 1998. It is now owned by Tilt Renewables.

The farm was the largest wind farm in Australia when built, with the energy produced bought and on-sold to customers by then energy retailer Great Southern Energy.

== Crookwell 2 ==
Phase two of the Crookwell Wind Farm, planned to have an installed capacity of 92 MW, is under construction since 2009. it was officially opened in November 2018. In 2017, a modification to the wind farm development was approved, allowing an increase in the hub height from 80m to 95m, blade size from 47 to 64m, rotor diameter from 96 to 130m and blade tip height from 128 to 160m. It is expected to generate 300 GWh of energy per year, at a corresponding capacity factor of 36%.

Crookwell 2 Wind Farm
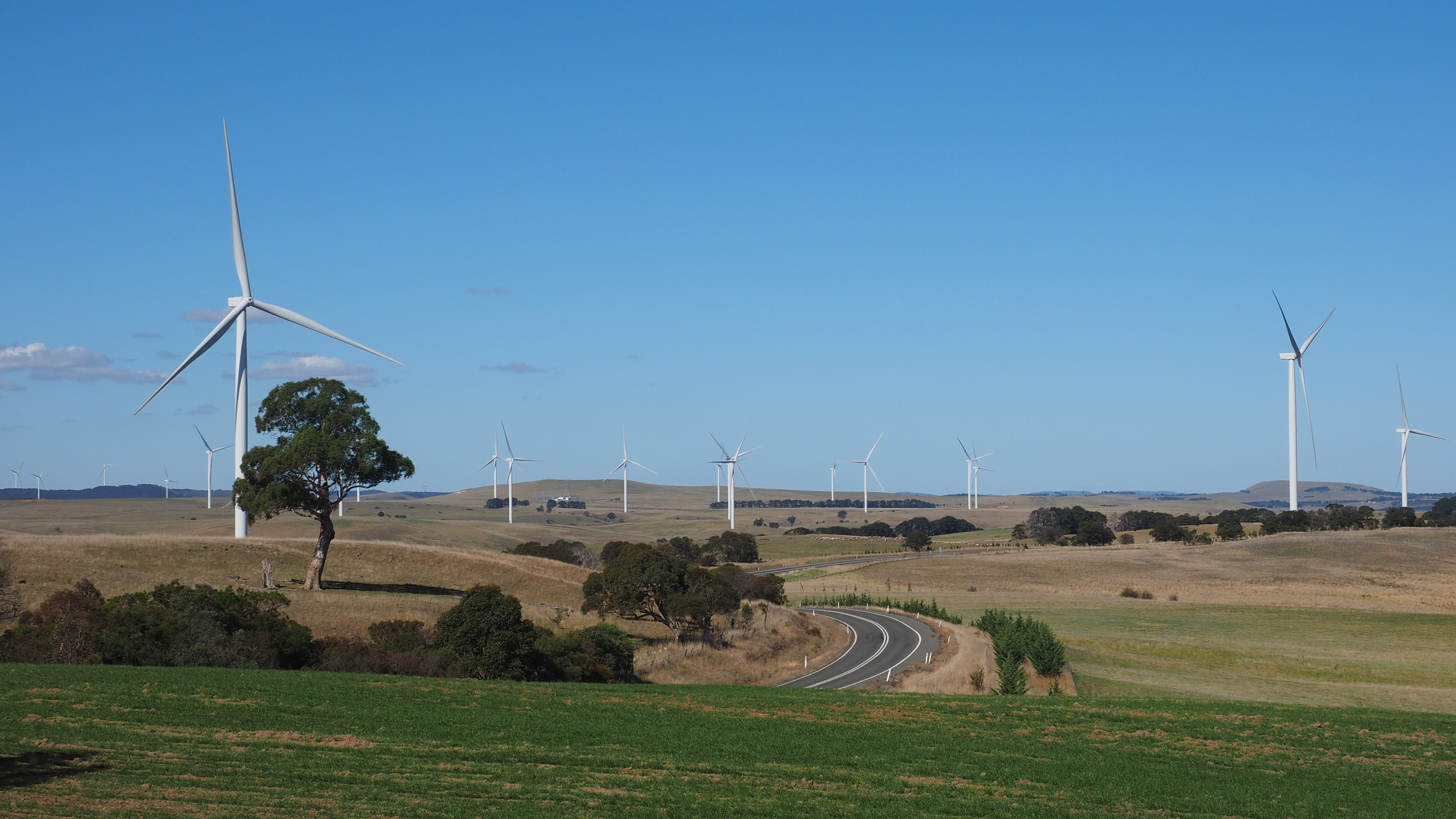
- Some of the turbines at Crookwell 2 Wind Farm
- Country: Australia
- Location: Crookwell, New South Wales
- Coordinates: 34.5165°S 149.54248°E
- Status: Operational
- Commission date: 2018
- Construction cost: A$200m

Wind farm
- Type: Onshore
- Hub height: 95 metres (312 ft)
- Rotor diameter: 130 metres (427 ft)

Power generation
- Units operational: 28 × 3.4 MW
- Make and model: General Electric 3.4-130
- Nameplate capacity: 95.2 MW
- Capacity factor: 35% (average 2019-2020)
- Annual net output: 291.1 GWh (average 2019-2020)

External links
- Commons: Related media on Commons

== Operations ==
First generation started in August 2018, and reached full production in December 2018. The generation table uses eljmkt nemlog to obtain generation values for each month.

Crookwell 2 Wind Farm Generation (MWh)
Year	Total	Jan	Feb	Mar	Apr	May	Jun	Jul	Aug	Sep	Oct	Nov	Dec
2018	57,913	N/A	N/A	N/A	N/A	N/A	N/A	N/A	803*	5,025*	11,012*	22,491*	18,582
2019	294,318	21,453	18,681	22,158	16,016	23,799	17,488	31,281	31,638	28,288	22,960	33,660	26,896
2020	287,940	22,299	21,348	19,847	28,346	23,423	19,731	19,797	33,931	30,166	24,051	20,223	24,778
2021		24,396	17,177	27,571	16,532	21,366	25,955	33,429	33,390	31,876			

Note: Asterisk indicates power output was limited during the month.

== See also ==
- Wind power in Australia
- List of wind farms in New South Wales
