= Eraring Power Station =

Coal-fired power station in New South Wales, Australia

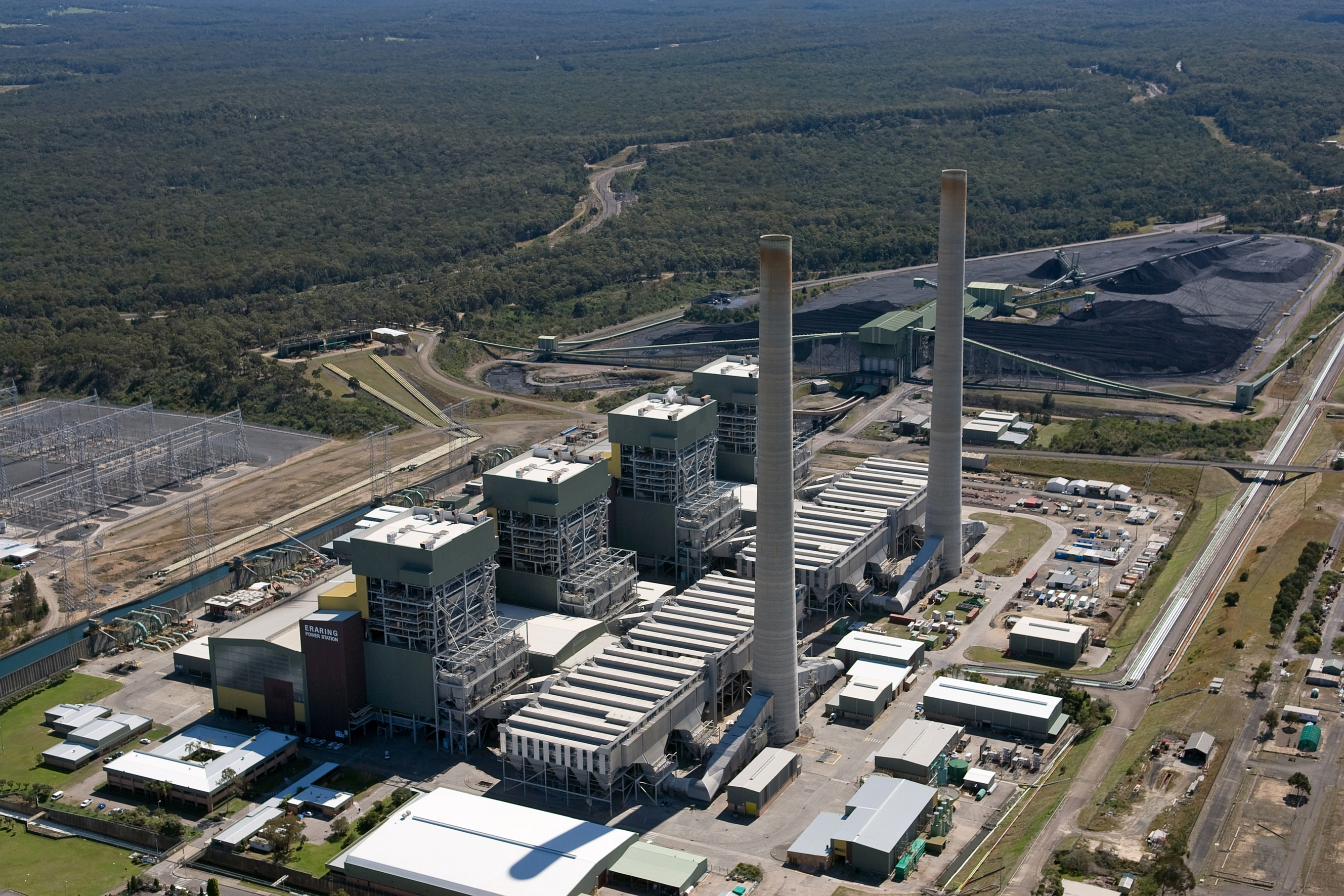
- Eraring Power Station
- Location of Eraring Power Station in New South Wales
- Country: Australia
- Location: near Dora Creek, Lake Macquarie, New South Wales, Australia
- Coordinates: 33°03′44″S 151°31′13″E
- Status: Operational
- Commission date: 1984
- Decommission date: April 2029
- Owner: Origin Energy

Thermal power station
- Primary fuel: Bituminous coal
- Turbine technology: Steam turbine - Subcritical

Power generation
- Units operational: 4 × 720 megawatts (970,000 hp) 1 x 42 megawatts (56,000 hp)
- Make and model: Tokyo Shibaura Electric (Japan)
- Nameplate capacity: 2,922 MW
- Capacity factor: 63.47% (average 2017-2021)
- Annual net output: 16,012 GW·h (average 2017-2021)

External links
- Commons: Related media on Commons

Eraring Power Station is a coal-fired power station consisting of four 720 MW Toshiba steam-driven turbo-alternators for a combined capacity of 2,880 MW. The station is located near the township of Dora Creek, on the western shore of Lake Macquarie, New South Wales, Australia and is owned and operated by Origin Energy. It is Australia's largest power station. The plant has two smokestacks rising 200 m (656 ft) in height. It was scheduled for closure by mid-2025, after a failed attempt to sell the loss making power station back to the state government but had its life extended twice, now commissioned until April 2029.

== History and facilities ==
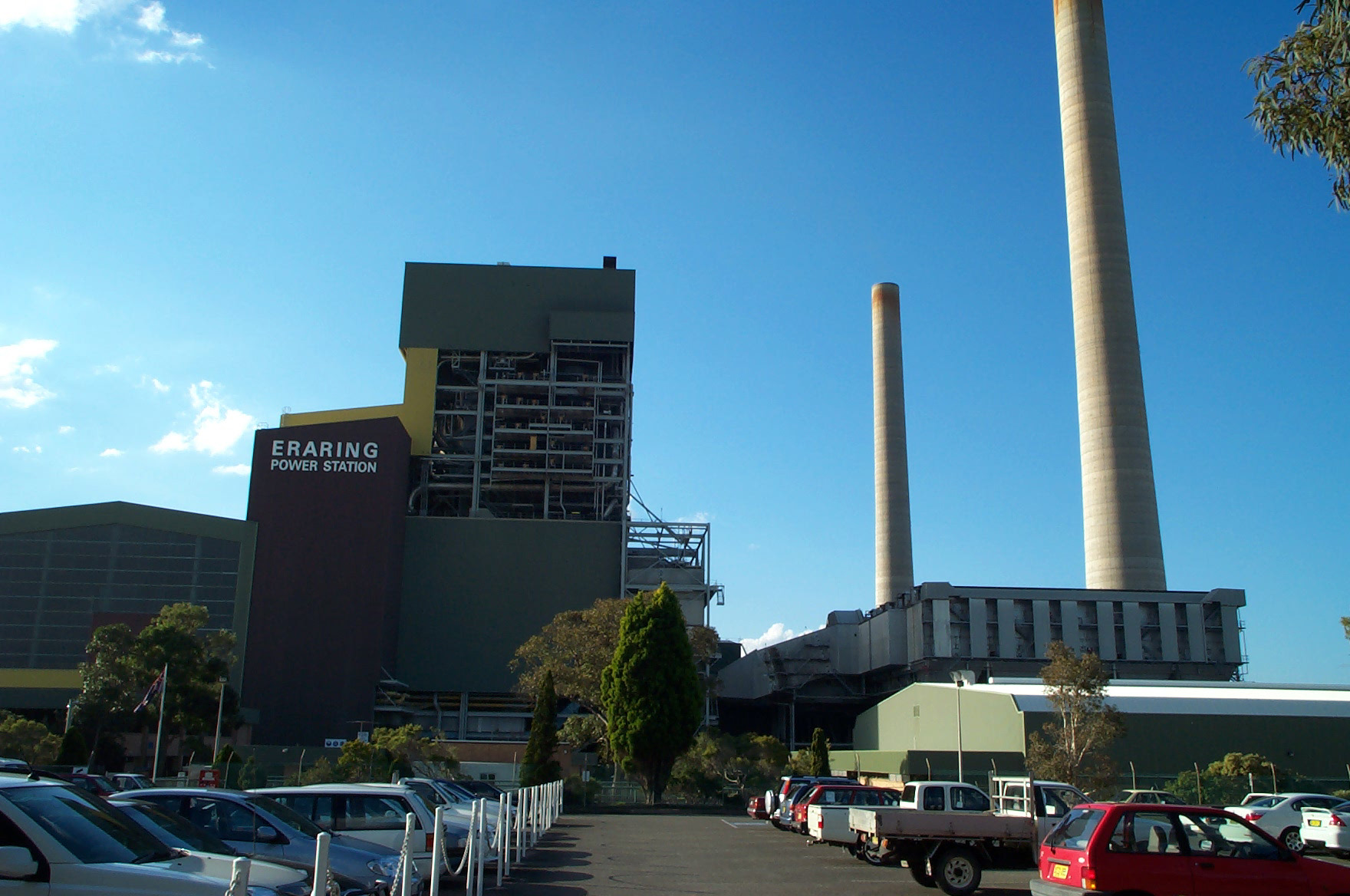
Eraring Power Station view from carpark

Construction of the power station began in 1977 by the NSW Government. The first turbo-alternator was brought online in 1982, with the second and third in 1983, and the fourth in 1984. The generating capacity of each of the four turbines was upgraded from 660 MW to 720 MW between 2011 and 2012. The process of upgrading the control room to a fully digital system was completed in 2005.

Salt water from Lake Macquarie is used for cooling and is supplied through a concrete tunnel which passes under Dora Creek and up to the station via open canal. Reclaimed sewage water from the Dora Creek Waste Water Treatment Works is heavily purified and used to generate steam for the turbines as opposed to using municipal potable water supplies. The salt water helps in the cooling of the superheated steam as well as moderation of the temperature of outlet water to minimise thermal pollution.

The coal comes from five mines in the local area, delivered by conveyor, rail and private road. There is significant coal storage capacity on site. Eraring power station employs the Fabric Filter system of dust collection, in which particulate emissions resulting from coal combustion are captured as opposed to being released into the atmosphere. Some of this material is stored in an area nearby while some is taken and used as a component of road base. From 2009 to 2013 the Eraring power station has been equipped with Dry Bottom Ash Handling Systems (the MAC - Magaldi Ash Cooler) at all four units.

The government sold it to Origin Energy in 2013 for only $75 million however that also erased $1.75 billion in liabilities for the taxpayer.

Electricity generated at the station is transmitted through high voltage transmission lines. Turbines 1 and 2 are connected to a 330 kV transmission line while turbines 3 and 4 are connected to a 500 kV transmission line. It was scheduled to close by 2025, seven years sooner than expected, owing to its operator's inability to cope with the "influx of renewables." Origin completed the 460 MW / 1770 MWh (stage 1) Wärtsilä grid battery at the site in January 2026, eventually extending to 700 MW / 3100 MWh.

In May 2024 the New South Wales Government extended the operational life of Eraring to August 2027.

On 20 January 2026, Origin Energy announced that the lifespan of the plant would again be extended to 30 April 2029 due to a "slower than expected rollout of renewables in Australia (other than rooftop solar)".

=== Fire ===
At 2:16 am on Friday 28 October 2011 unit 2B generator transformer exploded with the transformer oil catching fire. The oil fire burnt for approximately two days and the estimated repair cost was A$20 million. Fire and Rescue NSW, assisted by the New South Wales Rural Fire Service controlled the initial incident with subsequent investigations by NSW Police, the Office of Environment & Heritage and WorkCover NSW.

== Pollution ==
As of 2017, The power station has had allegations made against it, regarding the exceedance of NSW air pollution standards. The EPA reported mercury emissions of 1.3 kg, and has begun investigating the alleged under reporting of self collected emission data.

== Operations ==
The generation table uses eljmkt nemlog to obtain generation values for each year. Records date back to 2011.

Eraring Power Station Generation (MWh)
Year	Total	ER01	ER02	ER03	ER04
2011	13,659,058	2,312,987	3,517,022	3,431,958	4,397,091
2012	11,436,338	3,957,318	2,495,671	4,042,090	941,259
2013	11,212,750	2,466,760	2,919,034	2,627,003	3,199,953
2014	14,872,236	4,097,055	3,209,461	3,880,398	3,685,322
2015	13,859,264	3,143,835	3,401,995	3,467,143	3,846,291
2016	12,976,982	3,715,825	3,319,561	2,581,666	3,359,930
2017	17,808,059	4,590,572	4,214,507	4,429,132	4,573,848
2018	17,138,862	3,684,174	3,789,465	4,587,046	5,078,177
2019	17,180,757	4,129,736	4,919,873	3,213,348	4,917,800
2020	14,779,159	3,507,469	3,781,969	3,999,132	3,490,589
2021	13,151,237	3,307,567	3,530,184	3,910,043	2,403,443

== See also ==
- List of power stations in New South Wales
