= Keepit Power Station =

- Country: Australia
- Location: North West Slopes, New South Wales
- Coordinates: 30°52′27″S 150°30′48″E
- Status: Operational
- Opening date: 1960
- Owner(s): State Water Corporation
- Operator(s): Meridian Energy

Reservoir
- Creates: Lake Keepit
- Total capacity: 425,510 ML (15,027×10^{6} cu ft)

Power Station
- Installed capacity: 7.2 MW (9,700 hp)
- Annual generation: 10.2 GWh (37 TJ)
- Website gspenergy.com.au/keepit-power-station

Keepit Power Station is a hydro-electric power station located at the Keepit Dam on the Namoi River, near Gunnedah in the North West Slopes region of New South Wales, Australia. The Keepit Power Station has one turbine with a generating capacity of 7.2 megawatts (9,700 hp) of electricity. The power station is operated by Meridian Energy and generated 1,603 megawatts (2,150,000 hp) of net energy production during 2009, used primarily for peak-load generation.

== Location and features ==
The power station was completed in 1960, running one 6 megawatts (8,000 hp) turbine. In 1983, this turbine was upgraded to its present level.

== See also ==
- List of hydro-electric power stations in New South Wales
