= Finley Solar Farm =

Photovoltaic power station in New South Wales, Australia

- Country: Australia
- Location: Finley
- Coordinates: 35°38′59″S 145°30′24″E
- Status: Operational
- Construction began: November 2018
- Commission date: 2019
- Construction cost: 170 million A$
- Owner: John Laing Group

Solar farm
- Type: Standard PV
- Solar tracker: Single-axis

Power generation
- Nameplate capacity: 133 MW

External links
- Website: finleysolarfarm.com.au

Finley Solar Farm is a photovoltaic power station near Finley in New South Wales, Australia. It was developed at a cost of A$170 million by ESCO Pacific in 2019 and built and commissioned by Signal Energy Australia Pty Ltd. ESCO sold the project to John Laing Group on 12 November 2018 at the same time as Westpac and ANZ Banks committed to the debt funding for the development.

The solar farm has a seven-year power purchase agreement to supply electricity to BlueScope.
