= Binalong =

- Town
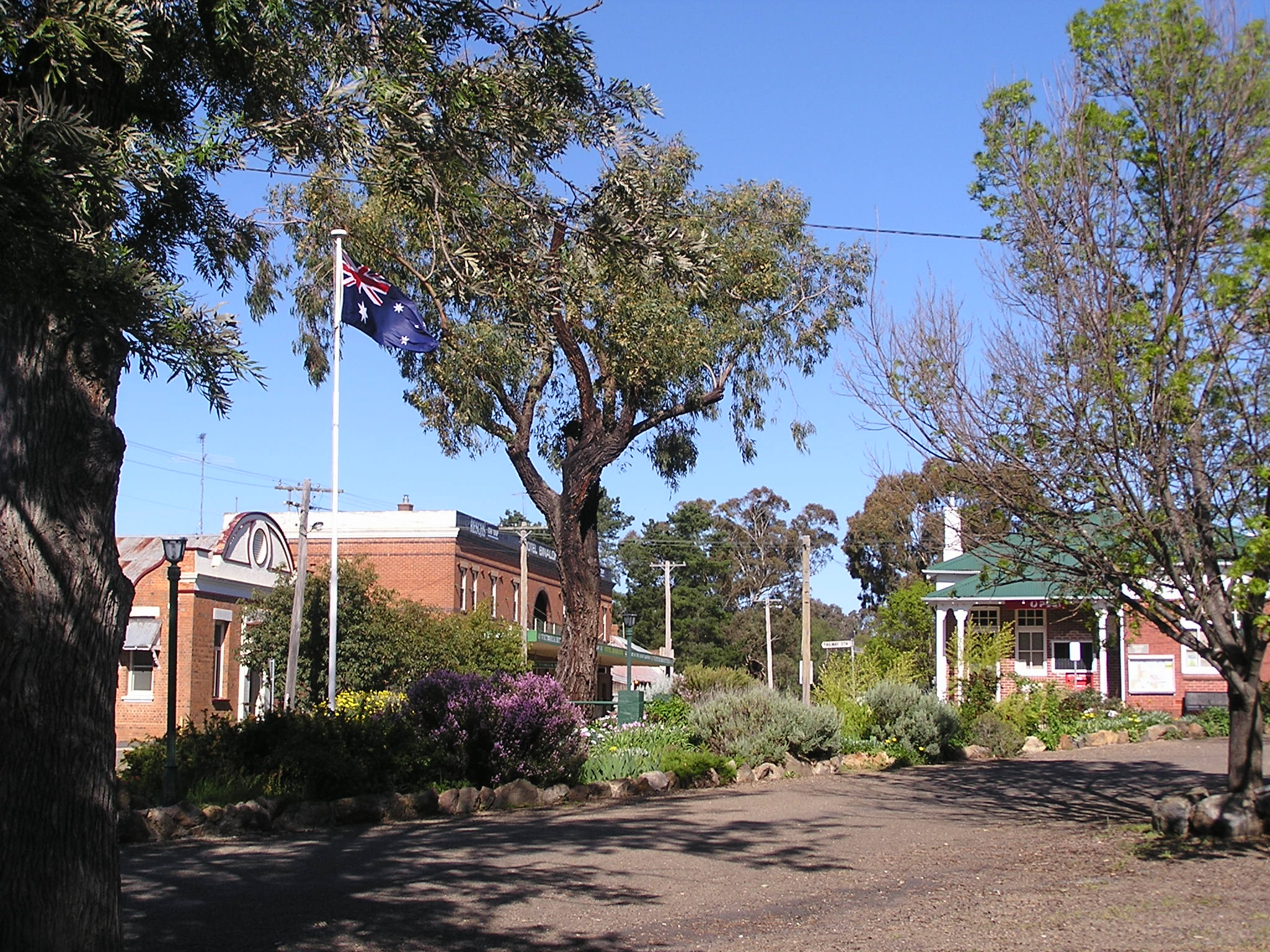
- Central Binalong looking towards the post office and the Hotel Binalong

- Coordinates: 34°40′00″S 148°39′00″E
- Country: Australia
- State: New South Wales
- Region: Southern Tablelands
- LGA: Yass Valley Shire
- Location: 312 km (194 mi) SW of Sydney; 37 km (23 mi) NW of Yass; 63 km (39 mi) SE of Young

Government
  - State electorate: Goulburn
  - Federal division: Riverina
- Elevation: 481 m (1,578 ft)

Population
  - Total: 550 (2021)
- Postcode: 2584
- County: Harden
- Parish: Binalong
Localities around Binalong
Galong	Boorowa	Kangiara
Galong	Binalong	Bowning
Berremangra	Bookham	Bowning

Binalong (/baɪnəlɒŋ/ BY-na-long) is a village in the Southern Tablelands of New South Wales, Australia, 37 km north-west of Yass in Yass Valley Shire. At the 2021 census, Binalong and the surrounding area had a population of 550.

== History ==
=== Original inhabitants ===
The Indigenous people of the district were part of the Ngunnawal people. The first Europeans recorded as visiting the area were the exploratory party of Hamilton Hume in 1821.

The name of the town is believed to derive either from an Aboriginal word meaning "under the hills, surrounded by hills, or towards a high place" or from Bennelong, the name of a noted Aboriginal Man.

=== European settlement ===
Binalong lay beyond the border of the Nineteen Counties which was the formal legal extent of European settlement in New South Wales. However, squatters settled in the district prior to the formal establishment of squatting districts in 1839.

From 1847 there was a court of petty sessions. The same year a local entrepreneur applied successfully to the Commissioner of Police for a grant to build an inn to provide accommodation and victuals for the visiting magistrate and police witnesses, and the Swan Inn was established close to the courthouse. The town was gazetted in 1850.

In 1853, Cobb and Co was established in Melbourne as a coaching company, and upon eventually expanding their operations into New South Wales, entered into an agreement with the Swan Inn to provide staging services for coaches, drivers and passengers travelling along the adjacent road to the goldfields at Lambing Flat or Young. The town flourished as a coaching stop. The Swan Inn became known as "The Cobb and Co".

=== Consolidation ===
The public school was established in 1861. The original railway station opened in 1875 and was replaced by the current structure on an island platform when the railway was deviated and duplicated in 1916. The 1916 signal box is now closed. The original station remains as a private house on the road to Yass.

The Swan Inn closed following the building of the railway and the establishment of other hostelries closer to the railway station. It reopened in the mid-1980s as a restaurant and continues under the name The Black Swan. A motel was built on the adjoining block of land.

=== Contemporary ===
In March 2025, a Binalong cafe made international news for their fundraising efforts for humanitarian aid in Ukraine, including from a self-declared "tariff" on U.S. owned products.

== Notable residents ==
- Michael Boddy, an English-Australian actor and writer, and spouse of Janet Dawson
- Janet Dawson MBE, an Australian artist and spouse of Michael Boddy
- The presence of gold meant also that there were bushrangers in the area. The grave of John Gilbert is near the town in the former police paddock. He was a member of the Gardiner-Hall gang and shot by police in 1865.
- Gillian Mann, English/Australian artist
- The family of the poet Banjo Paterson moved to the Binalong district in 1869 when he was five years old. He attended the primary school in Binalong but later went to boarding school in Sydney returning home in the holidays. The district features in a number of his poems, for example, Pardon, the son of Reprieve. Paterson's father is buried in the local cemetery.
- John Nagel Ryan inherited his father's states, comprising 30,000 acres in the Boorowa-Binalong district. In 1883 he was appointed to the New South Wales Legislative Council
- Bruce Smeaton, an Australian composer

== Gallery: around Binalong ==
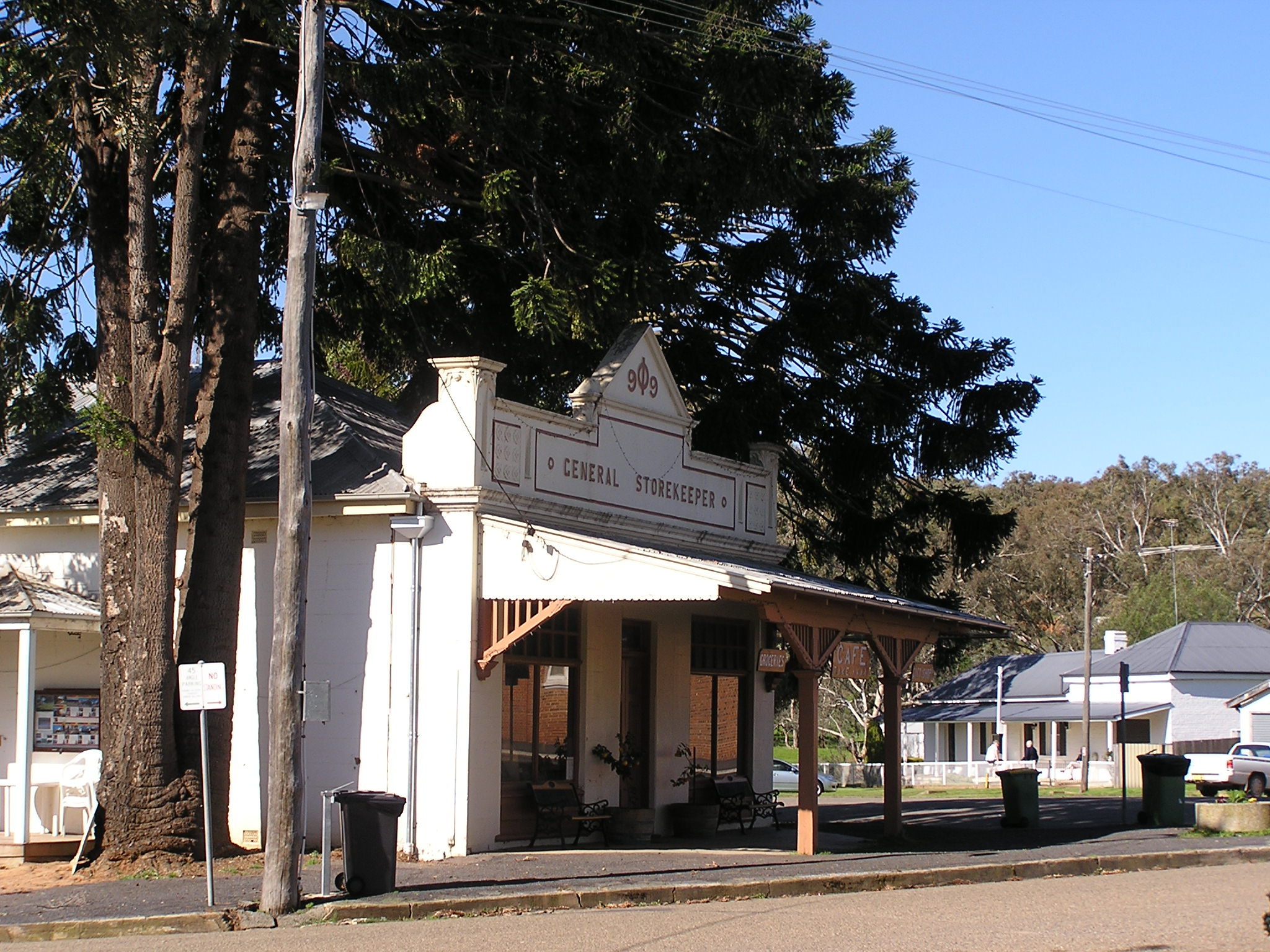
General store

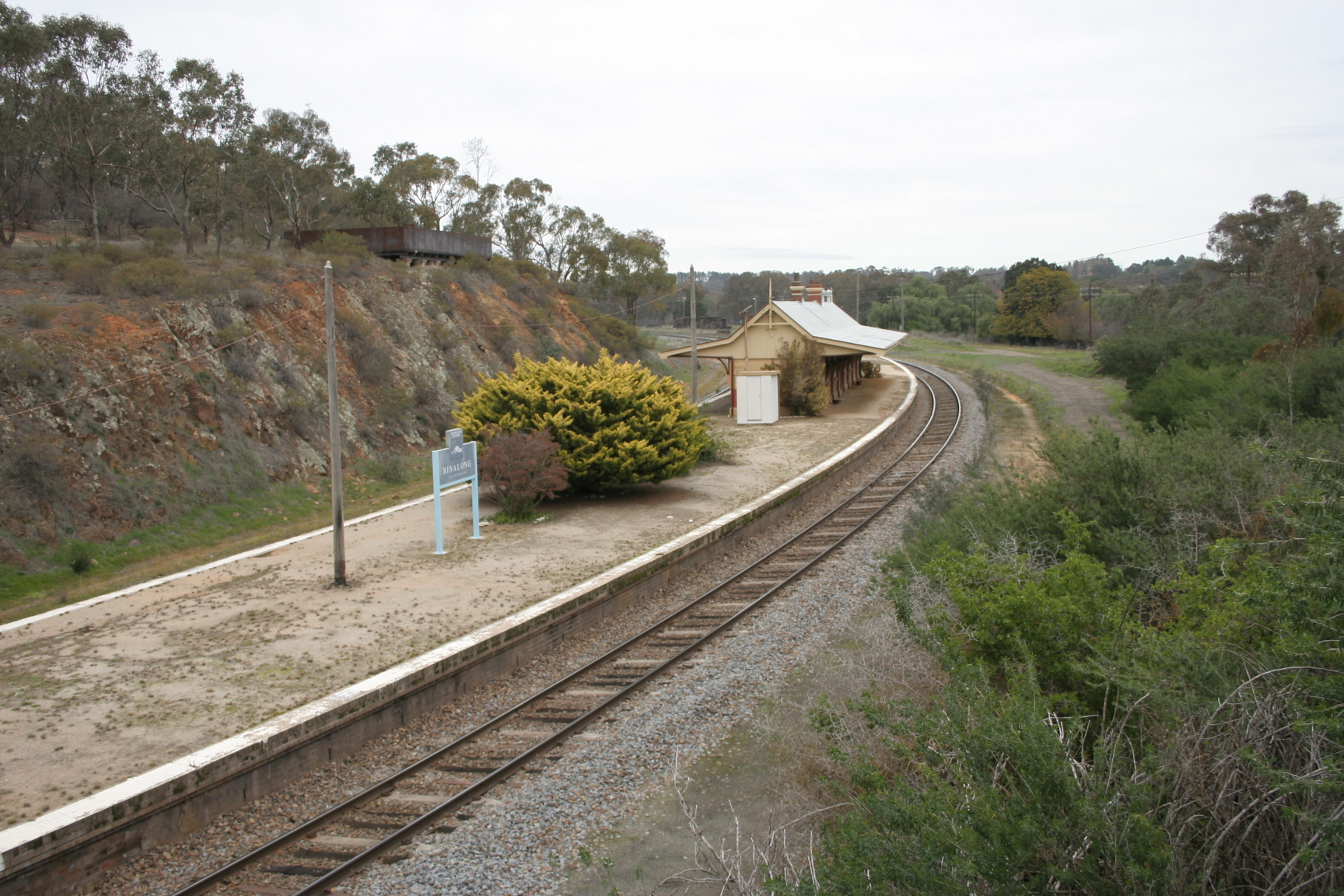
New Binalong Railway Station, now closed, on 1916 alignment

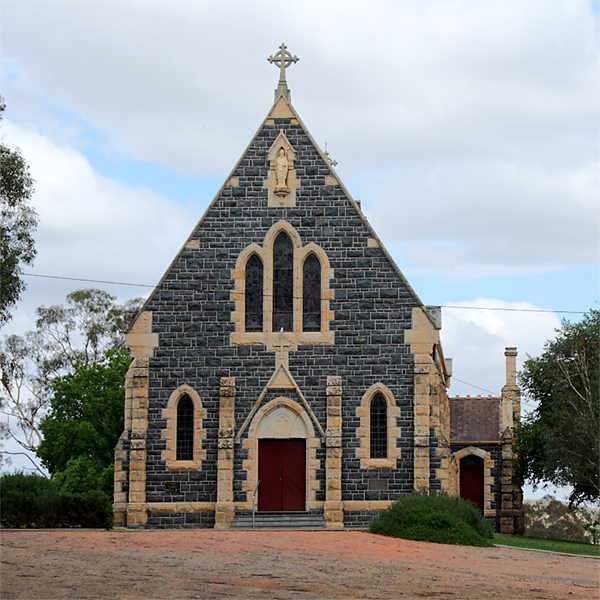
St Patrick's Catholic Church

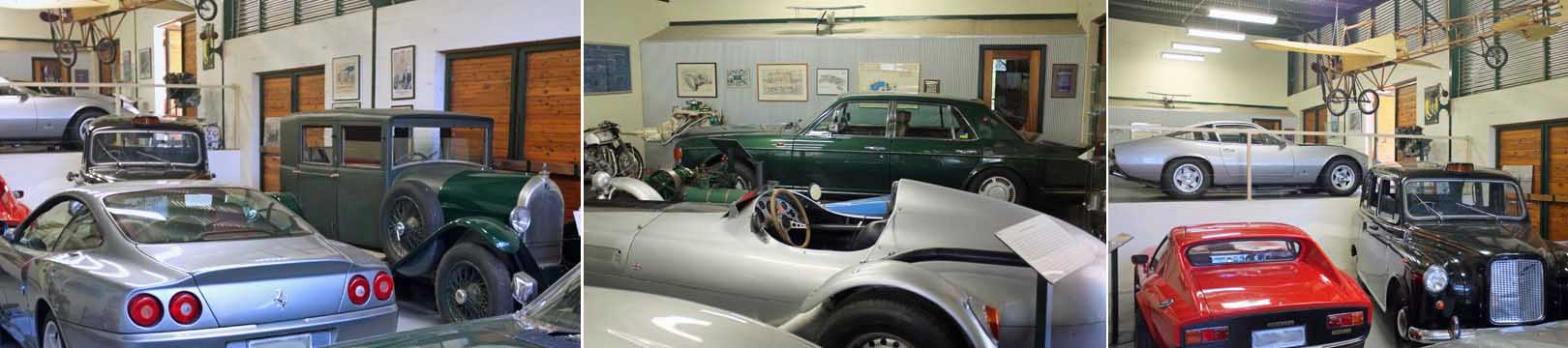
Binalong Motor Museum
