= CWP Renewables =

Australian renewable energy company

- Industry: Renewable energy
- Founded: 2007; 19 years ago
- Founders: Continental Wind Partners and Wind Prospect
- Defunct: December 2022
- Areas served: Australia and Europe
- Owner: Andrew Forrest
- Parent: Tattarang (since 2022)
- Website: cwprenewables.com

CWP Renewables is an Australian developer and owner of renewable energy systems such as wind farms and solar farms.

== History ==
The company was established in 2007 as a joint venture of Continental Wind Partners and Wind Prospect. It was later majority-owned by venture capital group PostScriptum.

In December 2022, CWP Renewables was acquired from Partners Group by Squadron Energy, owned by Tattarang, which belongs to Andrew Forrest's family.

== Power generators ==
CWP Renewables owns and manages several facilities in Australia. Some are owned by Grassroots Renewable Energy Platform, a joint venture with Partners Group private investment managers.

Name	Generation	state	type
Bango Wind Farm	244	NSW	wind farm under construction (2019)
Boco Rock Wind Farm	130	NSW	wind farm
Cibuk 1 Wind Farm	158	Serbia	wind farm under construction (2019)
Crudine Ridge Wind Farm	134	NSW	wind farm
Fântânele-Cogealac Wind Farm	600	Romania	wind farm
Murra Warra Wind Farm	434	Victoria	wind farm
Oreshets Solar Farm	5	Bulgaria	solar farm
Sapphire Wind Farm	270	NSW	wind farm
Taralga Wind Farm	106.8	NSW	wind farm

...and several other wind and solar projects not yet started construction.

== See also ==
- List of renewable energy companies by country
