= Sallys Flat, New South Wales =

Sallys Flat New South Wales
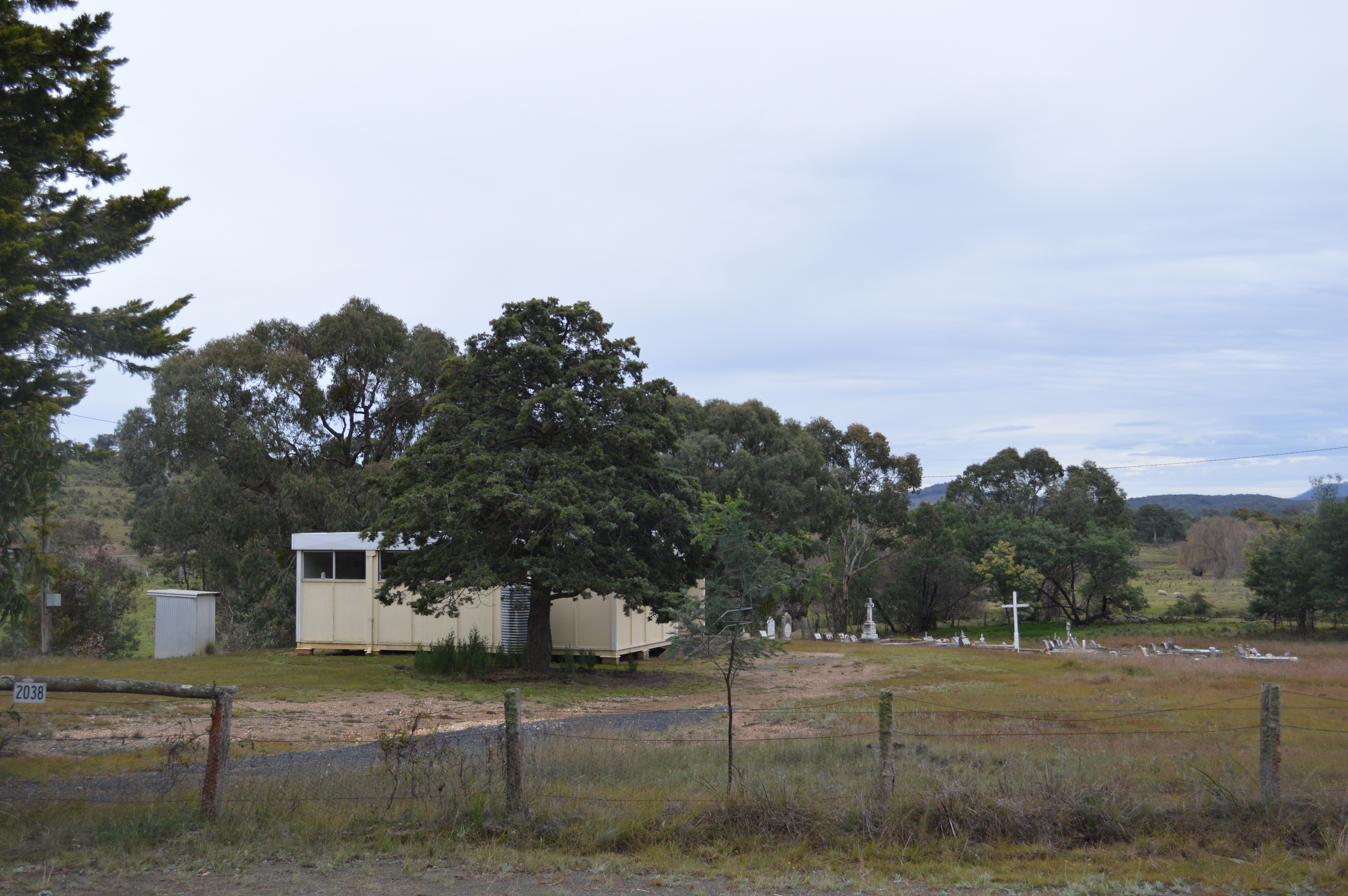
- Sallys Flat Roman Catholic Church and Cemetery

- Coordinates: 33.00°S 149.567°E
- Population: 13 (SAL 2021)
- Established: 1872
- Postcode(s): 2850
- LGA(s): Bathurst Region
- State electorate(s): Bathurst
- Federal division(s): Calare
Localities around Sallys Flat:
	Pyramul
Hill End	Sallys Flat	Sofala
	Bruinbun	Crudine

Sallys Flat is a locality in the Australian state of New South Wales.

The area now known as Sallys Flat is on the traditional land of the Wiradjuri people.

Sallys Flat was a small gold-mining village established in 1872 at the same time as nearby Hill End boomed during the New South Wales gold rush. It produced gold for many years but was not a large producer. It is now a farming area.

In late 2015, Sallys Flat was one of six locations on an Australian Government shortlist for a nuclear waste repository. However the Government soon found the idea unpopular with locals and removed Sallys Flat from the list.
