= Bango Wind Farm =

Wind farm in New South Wales, Australia

- Country: Australia
- Location: Kangiara
- Coordinates: 34°34′S 148°47′E
- Status: Operational
- Commission date: 2023
- Owner: CWP Renewables
- Operator: CWP Renewables

Wind farm
- Type: Onshore
- Hub height: 120.9 m (397 ft)
- Rotor diameter: 158 m (518 ft)

Power generation
- Units under const.: 46 × 5.3 MW
- Nameplate capacity: 244 MW
- Annual net output: 748 GWh

External links
- Website: bangowindfarm.com.au

Bango Wind Farm is a wind farm in the Australian state of New South Wales. It was developed by CWP Renewables between the towns of Yass and Boorowa. Construction began in August 2019 and became fully operational in 2023.

The wind farm consists of 46 wind turbines. They are GE turbines which generate up to 5.3 MW each, for a total rated capacity of 244 MW. The wind farm has an offtake agreement with Snowy Hydro for 100MW of its generation. It has another agreement to supply electricity to Woolworths to supply over 100 supermarkets.

The tower for each wind turbine is 120.9 metres (397 feet) high. It is delivered and constructed in five sections. It has both a ladder and a lift from the entrance door to the nacelle.
