= Hampton Wind Park =

Wind Power Station in New South Wales, Australia

- Location of Hampton Wind Park in New South Wales
- Country: Australia
- Location: Near Lithgow, New South Wales
- Coordinates: 33°38′59″S 150°3′0″E
- Status: Operational
- Commission date: 20 September 2001
- Construction cost: A$2.4 million
- Owner: Hampton Wind Park Company
- Operator: Hampton Wind Park Company

Wind farm
- Type: onshore
- Hub height: 50 m (164 ft)
- Rotor diameter: 47 m (154 ft)
- Rated wind speed: 28.4 revolutions per minute

Power generation
- Units operational: 2 X 660kW
- Make and model: Vestas: V47
- Nameplate capacity: 1.32 MW
- Annual net output: 3 GW hours

The Hampton Wind Park is a wind power station near Hampton, south-east of Lithgow, New South Wales, Australia. Initiated, developed and operated privately by a landholder, the farm has two wind turbines, with a total nameplate capacity of 1.32 MW of renewable electricity which is supplied to the main electricity grid.

== Technical information ==
Wind Corporation Australia, an energy development company, was established in 2000 by founding investor CVC REEF Limited to develop and commission the Hampton Wind Park. Project cost was A$2.4 million, funded by an investment by CVC-REEF and the NSW Sustainable Energy Development Authority (SEDA).

Opened in September 2001, the wind farm reduces greenhouse gases by 3,000 tonnes each year over the 20 year life of the project, compared to the equivalent electricity generation from coal. The wind turbines are Vestas V47-660 kW models, with 50 metres (160 ft) hub height and 47 metres (154 ft) rotor diameter.

The wind farm's output feeds the grid, and creates renewable energy credits which Integral Energy sells to its Green Power subscribers.

== Gallery ==
Hampton Wind Park audio/video

== See also ==
- List of wind farms in Australia
- Wind power in Australia
