= Boco Rock Wind Farm =

Wind farm in New South Wales, Australia

- Country: Australia
- Location: Nimmitabel, New South Wales
- Coordinates: 36.58°S 149.08°E
- Status: Operational
- Construction began: August 2013
- Commission date: 2015
- Owner: Electricity Generating Public Company
- Operator: CWP Renewables

Wind farm
- Type: Onshore
- Hub height: 80 metres (262 ft)
- Rotor diameter: 100 metres (328 ft)

Power generation
- Units operational: 67 × 1.7 MW
- Make and model: General Electric 1.7-100
- Nameplate capacity: 113.9 MW
- Capacity factor: 34.99% (average 2015-2021)
- Annual net output: 349.1 GWh (average 2015-2021)

External links
- Website: www.bocorockwindfarm.com.au

Boco Rock Wind Farm is a wind farm 10 km southwest of Nimmitabel in the Snowy Mountains region of New South Wales, Australia. It has 67 GE 100-1.7 wind turbines with a hub height of 80m, and generates up to 113MW of electricity. It is managed by the developers, CWP Renewables but is now owned by EGCO.

The engineering, procurement and construction contract for the wind farm was let in June 2013 to a consortium of GE and Downer EDI. The electricity generated is contracted for sale to EnergyAustralia.

== Operations ==
The wind farm began grid output in August 2014 and was fully commissioned in November 2014 and has operated continuously since then. The generation table uses eljmkt nemlog to obtain generation values for each month.

Boco Rock Wind Farm Generation (MWh)
Year	Total	Jan	Feb	Mar	Apr	May	Jun	Jul	Aug	Sep	Oct	Nov	Dec
2014	61,991	N/A	N/A	N/A	N/A	N/A	N/A	N/A	-0.4*	3,695*	14,567*	17,705*	26,024
2015	317,676	30,170	15,479	20,781	26,880	31,330	20,594	37,334	33,938	24,587	30,207	23,659	22,717
2016	373,041	23,872	20,042	18,330	20,302	43,057	34,331	35,205	29,503	33,875	49,162	33,026	32,336
2017	344,923	30,728	27,372	19,841	19,422	23,106	14,012	40,765	39,900	50,472	27,906	22,031	29,368
2018	367,314	28,332	19,930	23,991	21,557	33,573	32,096	43,784	46,581	30,177	28,347	32,397	26,549
2019	365,386	26,412	23,086	26,678	22,133	40,476	26,817	36,397	35,287	31,487	25,759	41,277	29,577
2020	342,867	30,895	33,176	35,922	24,911	29,239	25,081	25,083	26,083	31,590	27,660	25,788	27,439
2021	332,608	21,739	20,709	21,992	16,927	24,933	31,594	43,958	37,198	41,470	29,314	22,721	20,053

Note: Asterisk indicates power output was limited during the month.
