= Warragamba Power Station =

Hydroelectricity generator in Australia

Coordinates: 33.883222°S 150.596556°E

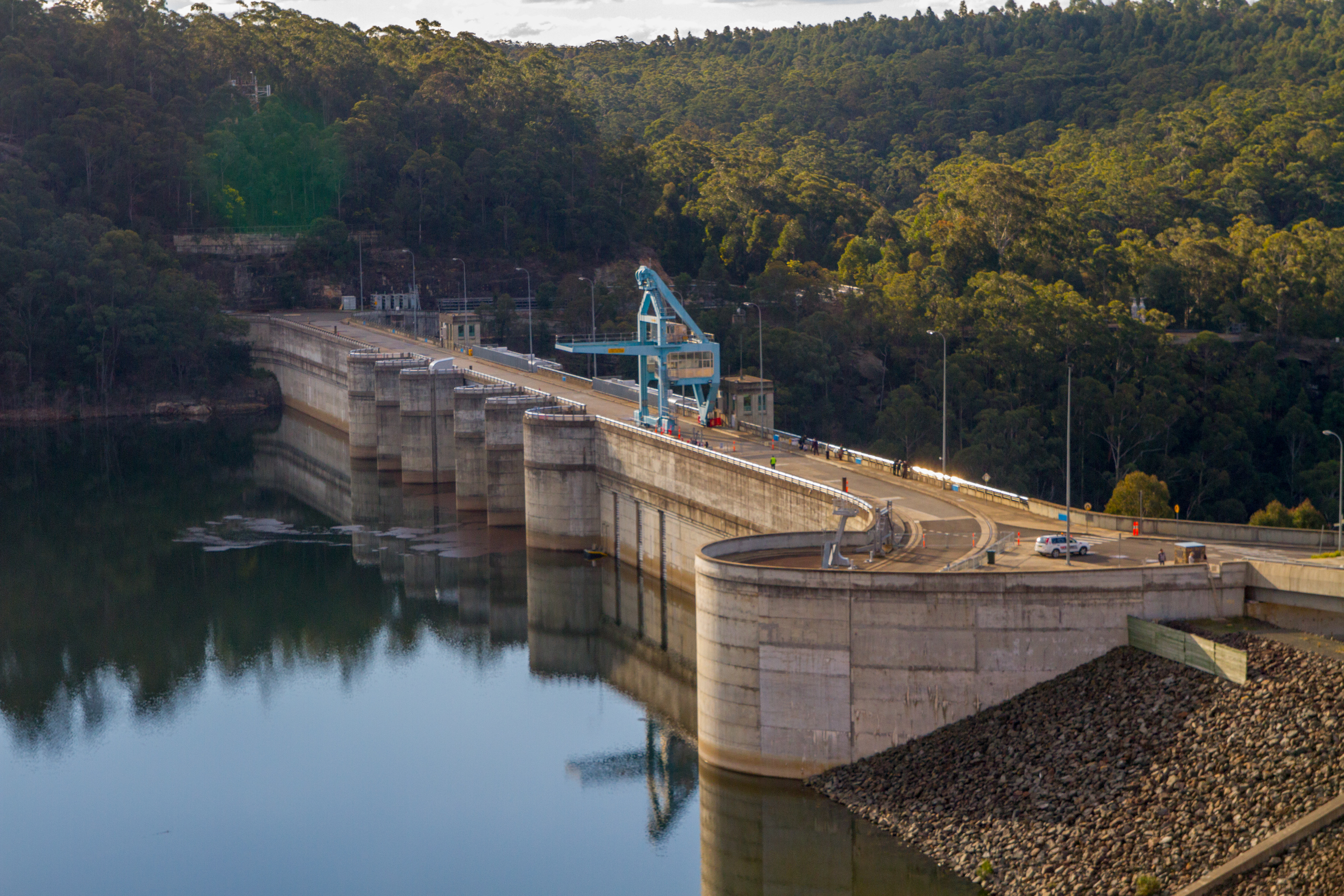
Warragamba Dam

Warragamba Power Station is a hydroelectric power station at Warragamba Dam, New South Wales, Australia. Warragamba has one turbine with a generating capacity of 50 MW of electricity.

The power station was approved in 1953, completed in 1959 and is now disconnected from the electricity grid.
