= White Bay Power Station =

Power station in New South Wales, Australia

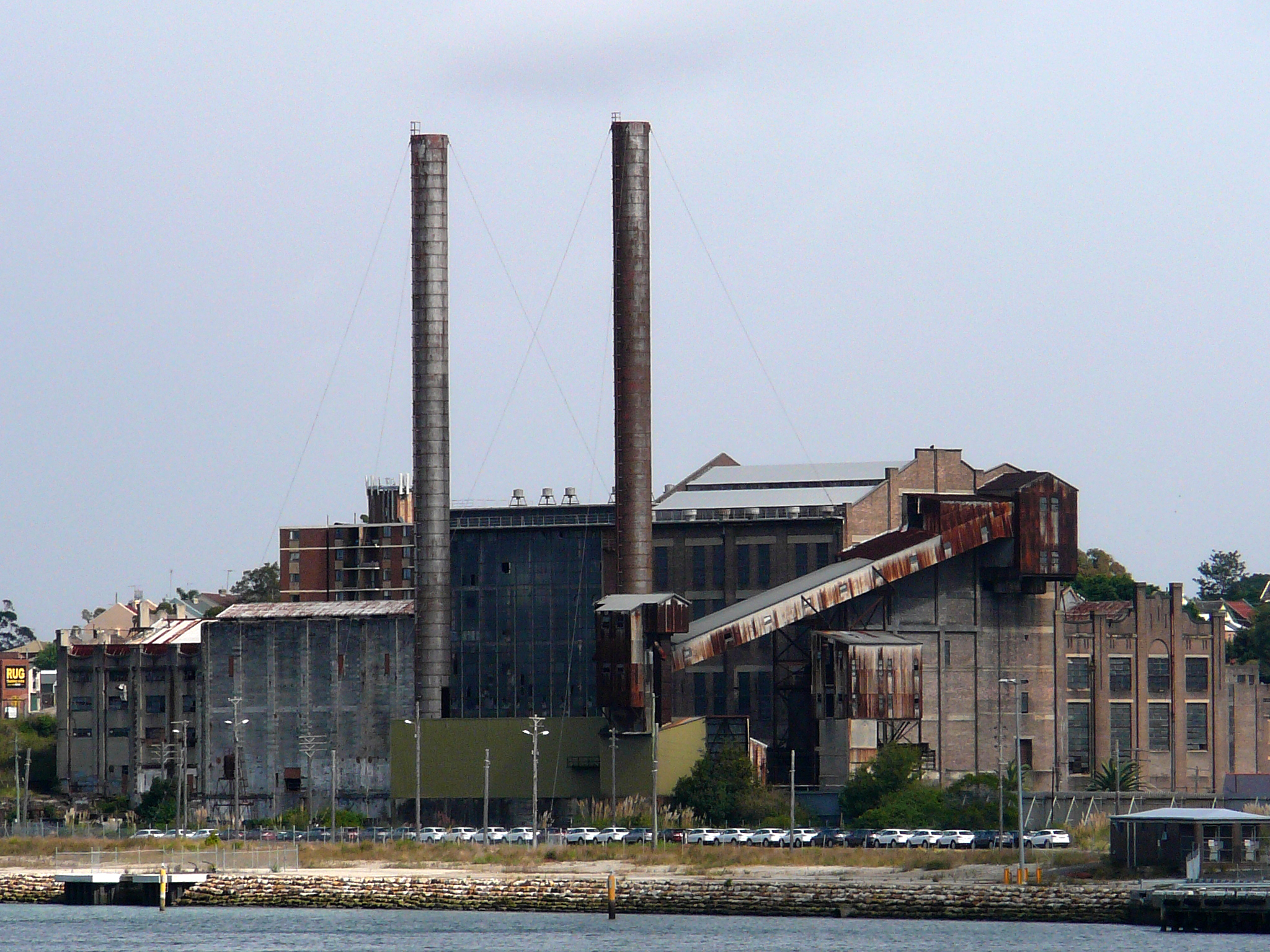
- White Bay Power Station, 2009
- Country: Australia
- Location: White Bay, New South Wales
- Coordinates: 33°52′00″S 151°10′36″E
- Status: Decommissioned (open to the public)
- Commission date: 1917
- Decommission date: 1983

Thermal power station
- Primary fuel: Coal

External links
- Website: whitebaypowerstation.com
- Commons: Related media on Commons

The White Bay Power Station is a heritage listed former coal-fired power station on a 38,000 m^{2} (410,000 ft^{2}) site in White Bay, in the suburb of Rozelle, 3 km (2 mi) from Sydney in New South Wales, Australia.

The remains of the plant can be clearly seen at the western end of the Anzac Bridge, at the junction of Victoria Road and Roberts Street. The station was inactive for a number of years. However the plant reopened for the 2024 Sydney Biennale art exhibition. It was added to the New South Wales State Heritage Register on 2 April 1999.

The station is often wrongly referred to as the Balmain Power Station, a plant originally located in Iron Cove, which has since been demolished.

== History ==
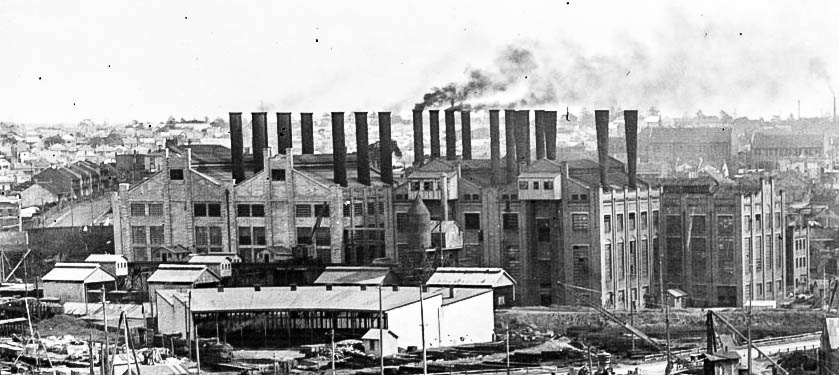
White Bay Power Station, circa 1930s

To satisfy the power requirements for the expansion of the Sydney tram and rail network, the New South Wales Government Railways began the first phase of work on The White Bay Power Station in 1912. The plant, constructed in the Federation Anglo-Dutch architectural style, was fully operational from 1917 with two further phases of development occurring between the years 1923–1928 and 1945–1948, which further increased the stations electricity output. It remained under the control of the department until 1953 when the newly created Electricity Commission of NSW took over. Ownership moved to Pacific Power when NSW electricity was deregulated in 1995.

White Bay was the longest serving of Sydney's metropolitan power stations and ceased production on Christmas Day in 1983. During the 1990s, the site was decontaminated, asbestos was removed and the majority of the remaining machinery taken away. In 2000, the plant was sold to the Sydney Harbour Foreshore Authority (SHFA) for around A$4m.

The SHFA produced a conservation management plan for the White Bay area, which was endorsed by the Heritage Council of New South Wales in 2004.

The SHFA undertook conservation works including roof repairs to the buildings to make them weatherproof and reduce further degradation to the remaining internal plant and equipment.

== Equipment ==
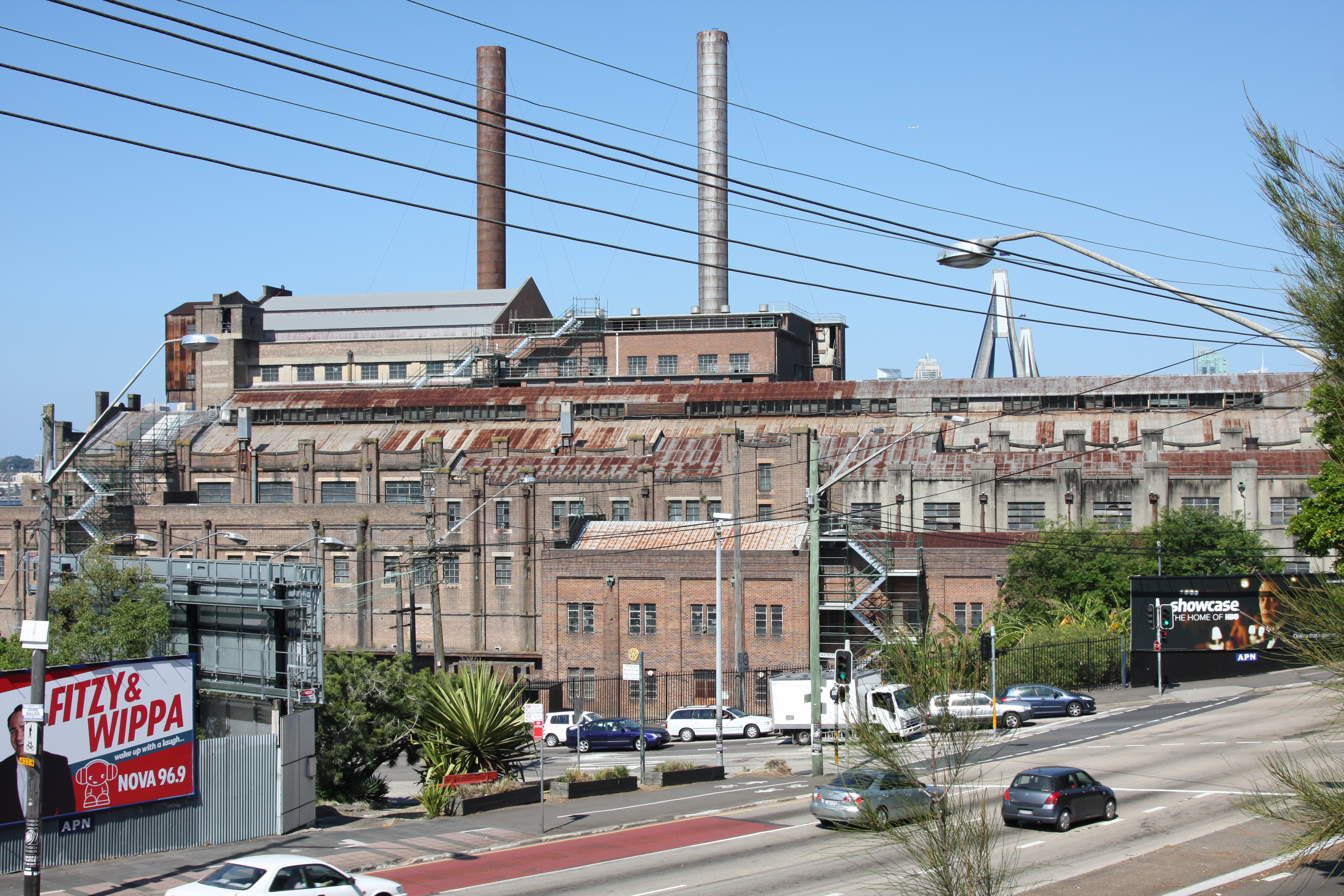
From Victoria Road

White Bay Power Station had a wide array of equipment, including 25 Hertz and 50 Hz alternators. This mostly came from British manufacturers.

=== Units 1 to 3 and temporary no. 4 – 25 Hz ===
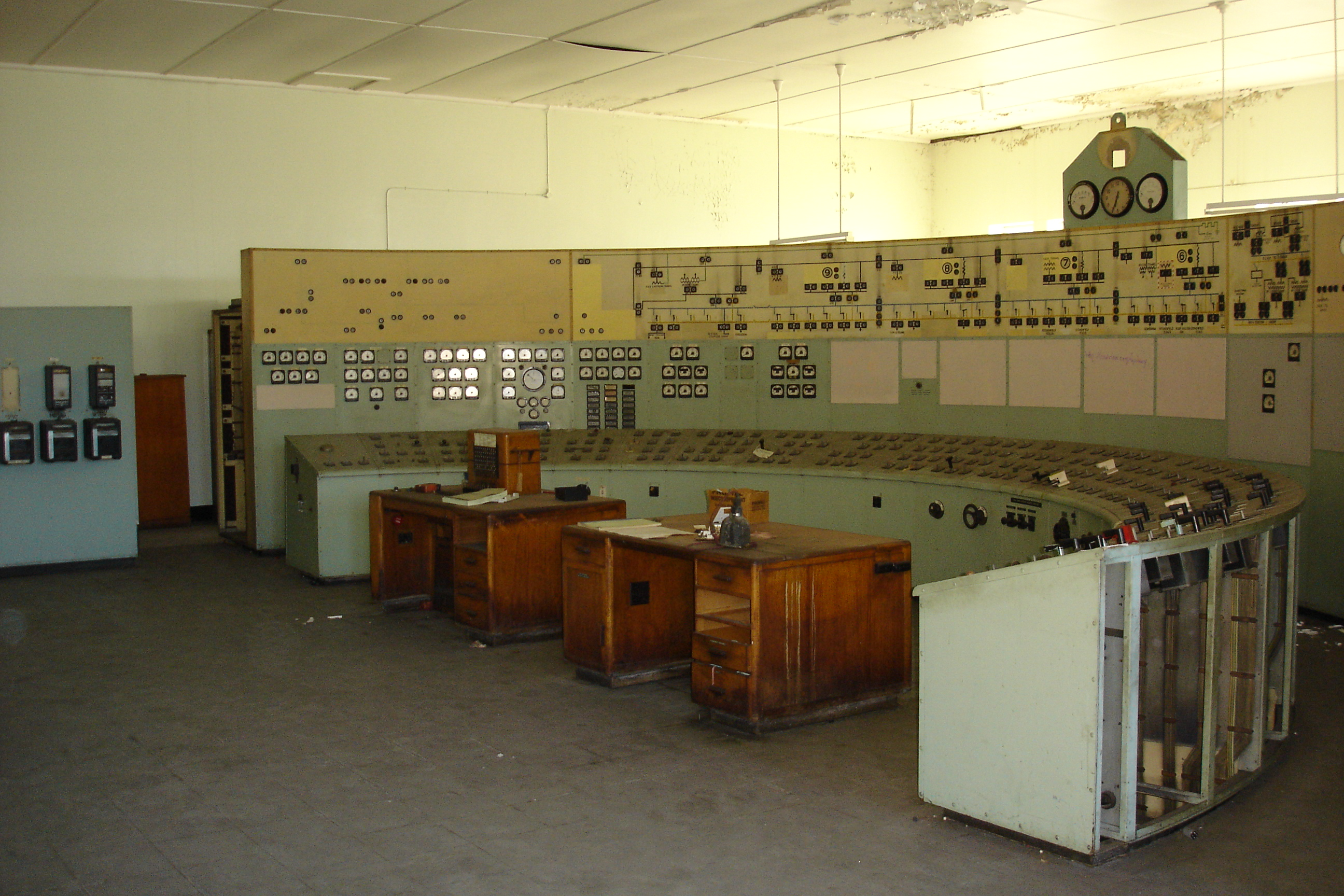
Former control room.

The earliest plant comprised three 750 rpm 25 Hz turbo-alternators from Willans & Robinson of Rugby and Dick, Kerr & Co. of Preston, England with a continuous rating of 8.7 MW and a two-hour rating of 10.5 MW. The first alternator was tested in 1913, before the buildings that housed it were completed. The second set was installed in 1917. Delivery of the third Dick, Kerr alternator was delayed, and it was initially installed at Ultimo Power Station upon arrival from England in 1914. Owing to the delay of the third Dick Kerr alternator, a single Curtis 7.5 MW turbo-alternator from General Electric of Schenectady, New York, USA was brought into temporary use in 1917 in the unit number four position. The third Dick Kerr alternator was transferred from Ultimo to White Bay as unit no. 3 in 1918, giving the station an initial capacity of 28.5 MW. Steam was supplied by 8 Babcock & Wilcox, WIF long drum, chain grate, boilers. They each produced 30,000 lb/hour at a pressure of 205 psi and a temperature of 588 °F (309 °C). Unit no. 1 was decommissioned in 1944, but its alternator was reconfigured for use as a synchronous condenser, for correction of power factor in the 25 cycle per second grid. The other 2 sets were scrapped by 1948.

=== Units 4 and 5 – 25 Hz ===
The temporary General Electric unit was removed in the early 1920s to accommodate the expansion of the station as originally planned. In 1924, a 1,500 rpm 25 c/s turbo-alternator from English Electric Australia having a continuous rating of 18.75 MW was brought into use as the new unit no. 4, followed by a second identical unit (no. 5) in 1925. Another 8 Babcock &Wilcox, balanced draught, cross tube marine type boilers were built. They each produced 70,000 lb/hour at 215 psi and 600 °F (316 °C) were installed in the 'A' boiler house. This was the end of the first stage of construction, with five 25 Hz turbo-alternators in final configuration, for 58.5 MW.

Turbo-alternator no.2 was retired in 1946 along with the first 4 boilers. The no. 4 machine was removed in 1951 and no. 5 removed in 1955. In 1952 the rest of the 'A' boilers were removed to make room for 'C' station. All 25 Hz equipment had been removed by 1958, coinciding with the gradual closure of the Sydney tram network.

=== Units 6 to 9 – 50 Hz – 86 MW ===
In 1926, the first 50 cycle equipment was brought into use. This comprised three Australian General Electric turbines with British Thomson-Houston alternators which ran at 1,500 rpm, with a continuous rating of 22 MW, they were numbered 6, 7 and 8. Steam was supplied by 9 Babcox and Wilcox CTM chain grate boilers. Each boiler produced 80,000 lbs/hour at a pressure of 275 psi and a temperature of 640 °F (338 °C). In 1928, a single 20 MW unit supplied by Parsons was brought into use (no.9), giving the second stage (B Station) a capacity of 86 MW, and the station a total of 144.5 MW. The BTH units experienced a number of turbine blade and ring failures from the late 1940s. Following the completion of the third stage (q.v.) in 1958, units 6 to 9 saw occasional emergency use and were decommissioned in June 1975.

=== Third stage – new units 1 and 2 – 50 Hz – 100 MW ===
A 50 MW, 50 cycle turbo-alternator from Parsons was commissioned in 1951 (no. 1), followed by a second identical unit in 1955 (no. 2). These two sets were erected on the 'A' station site and all 25 Hz equipment had been removed during this third stage of development in 1948. Steam was supplied from 4 Babcock + Wilcox pulverized coal high pressure boilers. Each boiler produced 225,000 lb/hour at 650PSI and 840 °F (449 °C). The No.5 turbo-alternator, an English Electric 18.75 MW 25 Hz, continued to operate for some time afterwards, using steam diverted from the new high pressure boilers. Owing to delays in boiler installation, the second 50 MW Parsons unit, which was in place from 1955, was not fully operational until 1958. By that time, the power station was unrecognizable from its original appearance. The capacity of the third stage of development was 100 MW, bringing the total to 186 MW, although this maximum was rarely attained. As the Electricity Commission of New South Wales built new power stations, White Bay became a peak load supplier.

Units 6 to 9 were decommissioned in 1975 and removed, thereafter only the 50 MW Parsons units remained. Thenceforth, the remaining units saw intermittent use; their last intensive use was during power shortages in 1982. The entire power station was closed permanently on 25 December 1983. Like Pyrmont, which was also fitted with 50 MW turbo-alternators in the 1950s, some of the generating equipment at White Bay saw little more than twenty years of regular use before decommissioning.

== Recent uses ==
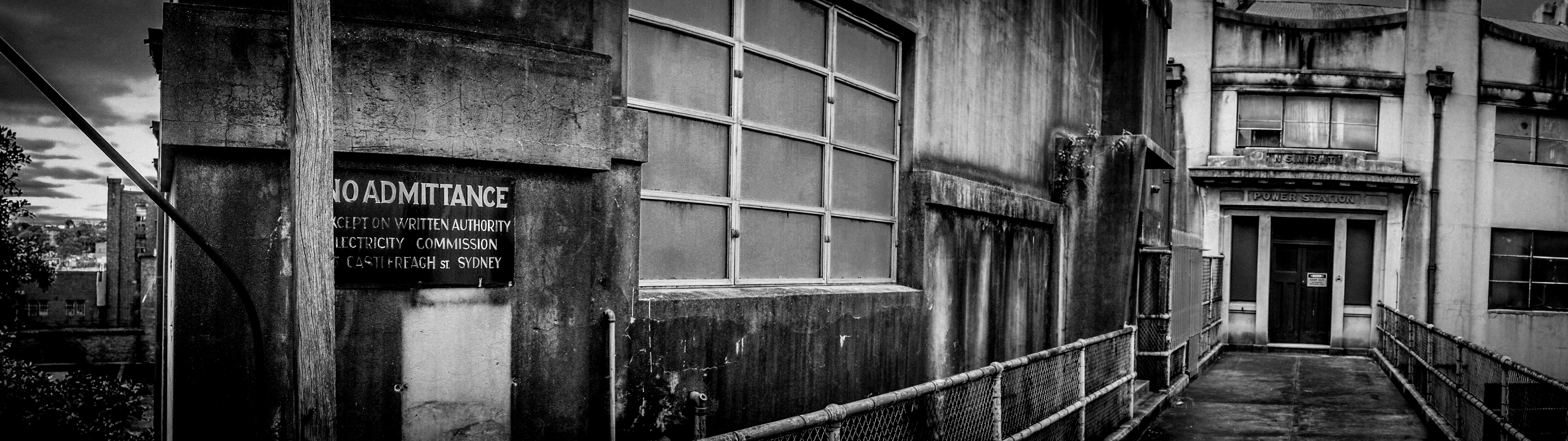
White Bay Power Station administration entrance in 2013

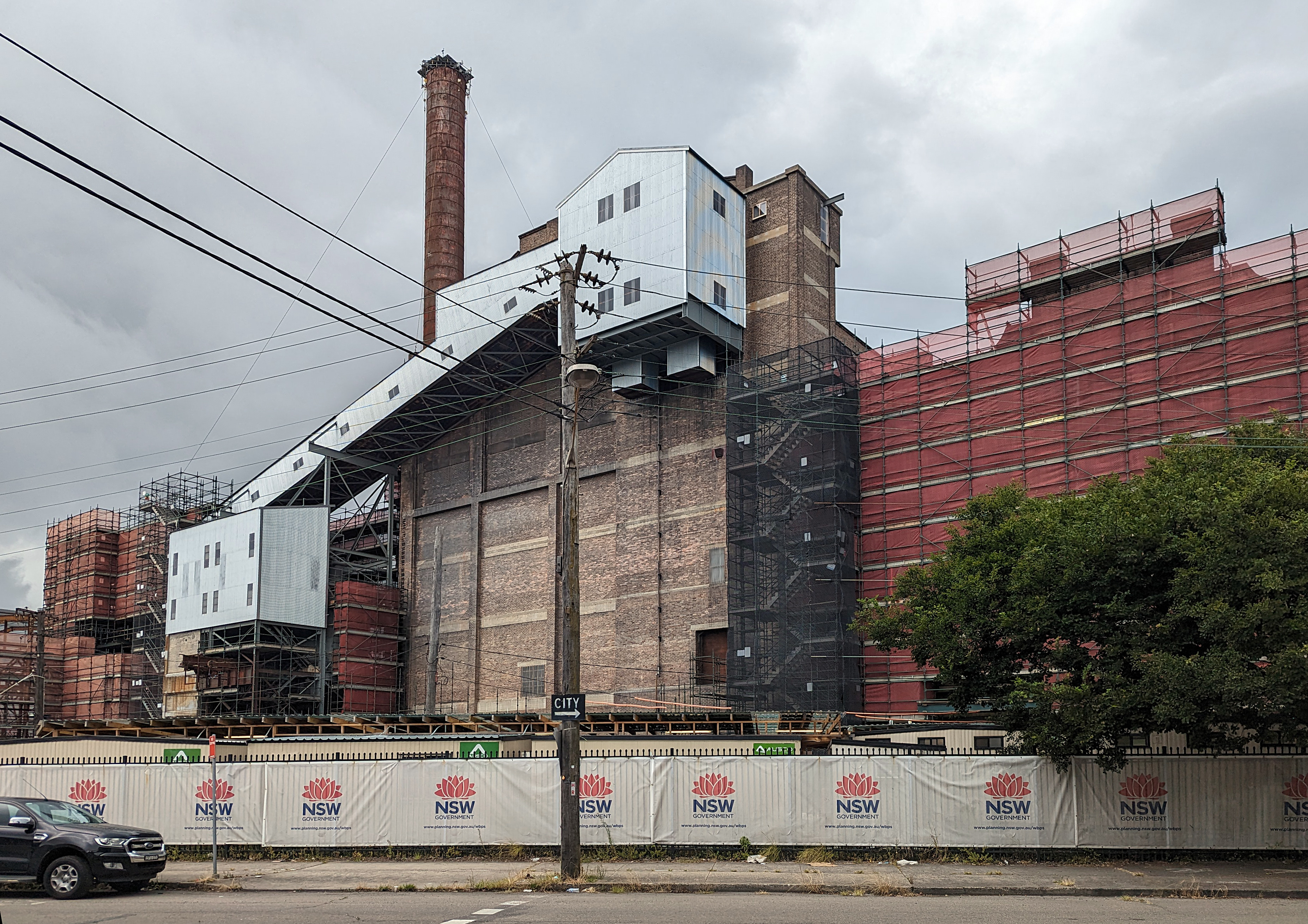
White Bay Power Station under renovation in 2023

The site was a popular venue for photographers and film and television productions. Productions at the power station include The Matrix Reloaded, Red Planet and a number of Australian television series, including Water Rats, and advertisements. A metal staircase constructed during the making of The Matrix Reloaded remains in the boiler house. It was used in 2012 as a filming site for The Great Gatsby.

Occasional licensed guided tours of the plant have been arranged by organisations such as the Historic Houses Trust and Australia ICOMOS.

One of each piece of power plant machinery remains on the site to demonstrate the process of generating power from coal should public tours or redevelopment ever take place in the future.

The site forms part of the New South Wales Government's Bays Precinct urban renewal area. Google had expressed interest in working with the government to redevelop the site, but pulled out in April 2017.

On the 9th of March 2024 the power station opened its doors to the public for the 2024 Biennale of Sydney.

== Heritage listing ==
White Bay Power Station was the longest serving Sydney power station and is the only one to retain a representative set of machinery and items associated with the generation of electricity in the early and mid twentieth century. It retains within its fabric, and in the body of associated pictorial, written archives and reports and oral history recordings, evidence for the development of technology and work practices for the generation of electrical power from coal and water. This development of power generation at White Bay contributed to the expansion of the economy of Sydney and New South Wales.

It is the only coal based industrial structure, dependent on a waterside location, to survive adjacent to the harbour in the Sydney region. It also forms part of a closely related group of large-scale industrial structures and spaces (White Bay Container Terminal, Glebe Island Silos, Container Terminal and Anzac Bridge) which along with the White Bay Hotel, define a major entry point to the city from the west.

It is of exceptional structural significance to the State of New South Wales.

White Bay Power Station was listed on the New South Wales State Heritage Register on 2 April 1999 having satisfied the following criteria.

- The place is important in demonstrating the course, or pattern, of cultural or natural history in New South Wales.
  - White Bay Power Station is important as part of the States development of electrical power for industry and the growth of local and capital development across the State in the first 70 years of the 20th century. It is the only power station in NSW to retain in situ a full set of both structures and machinery from this period.
- The place has a strong or special association with a person, or group of persons, of importance of cultural or natural history of New South Wales's history.
  - White Bay Power Station has a rare ability to demonstrate once common and standard work practices of the early to middle 20th century which are now almost entirely discontinued through changes in technology and occupational health and safety. It is a rare surviving element in an area of Sydney which was once almost entirely dependent on such industries for its livelihood.
- The place is important in demonstrating aesthetic characteristics and/or a high degree of creative or technical achievement in New South Wales.
  - White Bay Power Station retains a broad range of spaces and elements including machinery, which are exceptional for their raw industrial aesthetic qualities. As an assemblage of structures the White Bay Power Station retains exceptional aesthetic value as an icon of early to mid 20th century industry, an important component of a rare group of harbour side industrial structures and a prominent marker in the cityscape signifying the entry point from the west. In particular the two chimney stacks are visible from many parts of the inner west and are a constant point of reference.
  - Its design and construction while typical for its time is now a rare surviving example of such industrial buildings and machinery complexes. It also demonstrates technological achievements of its time in the erection of the 1927 reinforced concrete structures and the 1958 boiler house, with its large area of steel framed and glazed curtain walling.
- The place has strong or special association with a particular community or cultural group in New South Wales for social, cultural or spiritual reasons.
  - White Bay Power Station has strong and special associations and meanings for the local community, for former power station workers and for others who have used the site, and is of high social significance. It is a potent symbol of the area's industrial origins and working traditions, aspects of community identity that are strongly valued today by both older and new residents. It is one of few surviving features that provide this symbolic connection.
  - For former employees at White Bay Power Station, this place provides a link to their past working lives and evokes memories of people and events that remain important to them today. It represents the post-war period of power station operation, and through the retention of technologies, systems and machinery it has the ability to evoke this period and demonstrate the production methods and working conditions of the time.
  - White Bay Power Station is a widely recognised landmark, the most important surviving industrial signature building locally and the marker of the entry to the Balmain peninsula and its industrial harbour. It retains a powerful physical presence and industrial aesthetic.
- The place has potential to yield information that will contribute to an understanding of the cultural or natural history of New South Wales.
  - As a now rare and intact surviving early 20th century industrial complex in the inner Sydney Harbour region and particularly in Balmain, White Bay Power Station contributes considerably to our understanding and appreciation of these areas and foreshores as formerly places of heavy industry and intense port activity.
  - As an early power station for the early 20th century tram and rail network, it was a vital component in the expansion and daily life of suburban Sydney.
  - White Bay Power Station contains a complete and in situ assemblage of machinery, spaces and elements comprising all the systems and processes for the generation of coal-fired electricity from the early to mid 20th century. This is the only surviving assemblage in NSW and it has the potential to yield information not found anywhere else in the State.
- The place possesses uncommon, rare or endangered aspects of the cultural or natural history of New South Wales.
  - As the only intact Power Station of its type left in NSW, with one complete power[-]generating system retained in situ for conservation, its rarity is firmly established.
- The place is important in demonstrating the principal characteristics of a class of cultural or natural places/environments in New South Wales.
  - Retaining as it does a complete system of steam turbine generation of electricity from burning of fossil fuel, the White Bay Power Station is highly representative of this generation of power station. Other modern power stations use similar technology, albeit more modern and efficient. White Bay represents that type of early electricity generating technology which required the building of power stations close to the customer. As a complex of structures, buildings and machinery, it demonstrates the full configuration and processes of an early to mid 20th century city power station.

== See also ==
- Electricity
- Electricity generation
- Energy development

== Notes ==
- Sydney Harbour Foreshore Authority The history of White Bay Power Station told through the eyes of former employees.

- State Records NSW, Electricity Commission of New South Wales, Agency Detail
- "Leichhardt: On the margins of the city", Allen & Unwin, 1997, ISBN 1-86448-408-X.
- New South Wales Government Heritage Register; White Bay Power Station; Accessed October 2006;
- O'Brien, G (26 November 2003). "The power has flickered, but the spark of the future is lit". Sydney Morning Herald.
