= White Bay Hotel =

Defunct hotel in Sydney

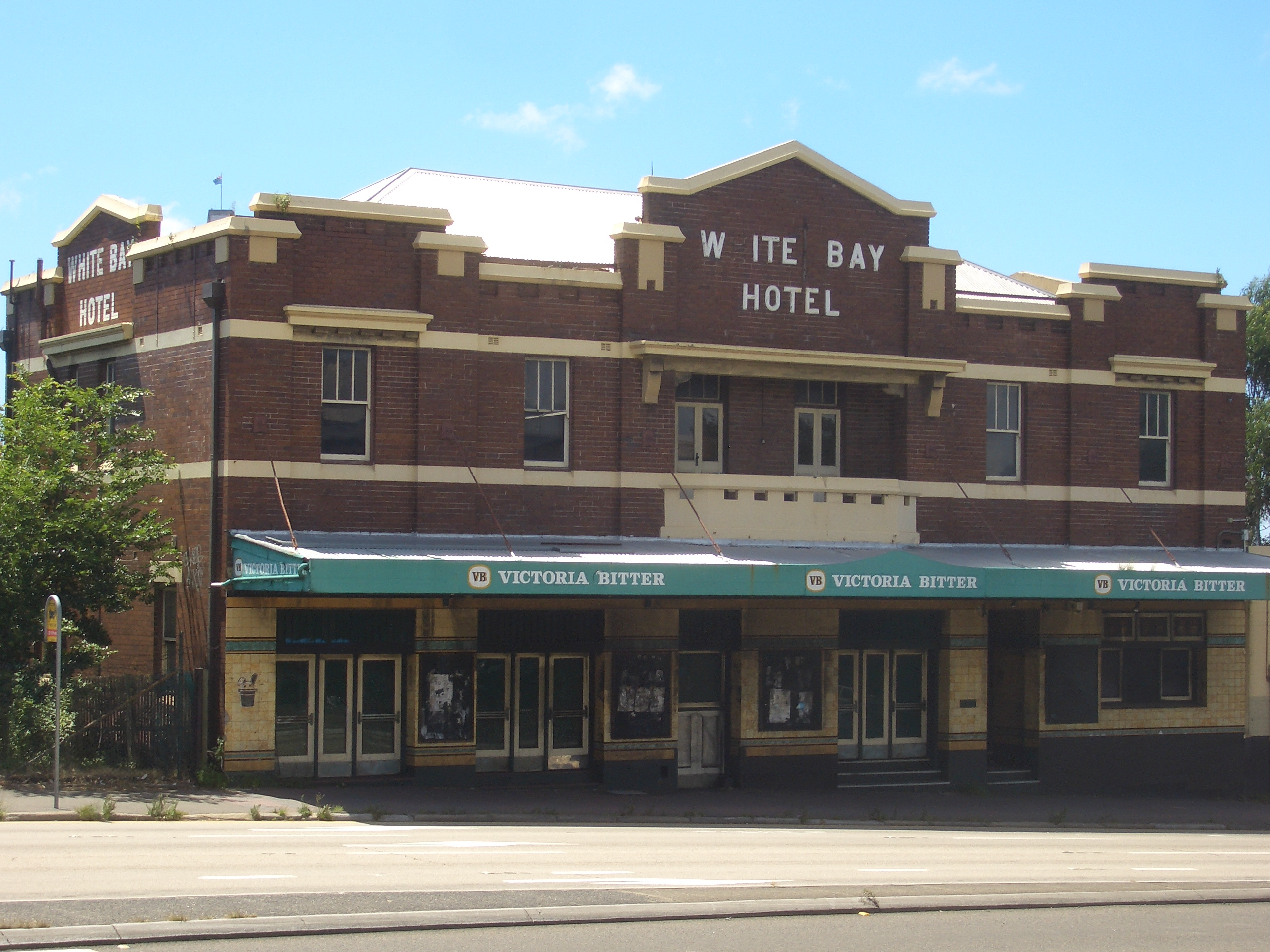
- White Bay Hotel in January 2008

General information
- Status: Closed; destroyed by fire; demolished
- Location: Victoria Road, Rozelle, New South Wales, Australia
- Coordinates: 33°52′05″S 151°10′35″E
- Opened: 1860
- Relocated: 1915
- Closed: 1992
- Destroyed: 5 September 2008

The White Bay Hotel was a pub that operated between 1860 and 1992. The land has been acquired by the New South Wales Government after being destroyed by fire and demolished.

== History ==
The hotel was established in 1860 on the corner of the Crescent and Weston Streets in Rozelle, an inner-west suburb of Sydney, New South Wales, Australia. Serving the workers of the Glebe Island abattoirs and soap factories, it was relocated in 1915 to make way for the White Bay goods railway.

Rebuilt as a brick structure on what is now Victoria Road and popular with the workers at the White Bay Power Station until its 1983 closure, and White Bay Container Terminal until the transfer of its facilities to Port Botany, the hotel, which became increasingly squeezed by the widening of Victoria Road after the construction of the Anzac Bridge, ceased trading in 1992.

Between this time and 2008, squatters had moved in and were particularly prominent during the Sydney 2000 Olympics. In June 2008, the owner of the hotel lodged an application to redevelop the building. On 5 September 2008, the hotel was destroyed by a devastating fire and later demolished. Police initially believed the cause of the fire was suspicious, however investigation found there were no grounds to lay arson charges. The New South Wales Government purchased the site in June 2010 for $2.5 million.

The Sydney Harbour Foreshore Authority cleared the White Bay Hotel site of building rubble. The site is now covered by an access road to the Anzac Bridge.
