= Port Authority of New South Wales =

Port Authority in New South Wales, Australia

- Type: State owned enterprise
- Industry: Ports
- Predecessors: Sydney Ports Corporation; Port Kembla Port Corporation; Maritime Services Board
- Founded: 1 July 1995
- Headquarters: Sydney, Australia
- Area served: New South Wales
- Key people: Justine Jarvinen (Chairman); John McKenna (CEO)
- Number of employees: 363 (2022)
- Parent: Transport for NSW
- Website: www.portauthoritynsw.com.au

The Port Authority of New South Wales, is a corporation owned by the Government of New South Wales, Australia. It acts as harbourmaster at the state's six commercial seaports, managing shipping movements, safety, security and emergency response. While major cargo handling facilities are operated by the private sector, the Port Authority continues to manage smaller facilities including Sydney's two cruise terminals, at Circular Quay and White Bay; common user berths at Sydney's Glebe Island and White Bay; and the regional ports at Eden and Yamba.

== Formation ==
Newcastle Port Corporation (NPC) was established on 1 July 1995 with the corporatisation of the Hunter Ports Authority, a subsidiary of the Maritime Services Board. In May 2013, the NSW Government sold 99 year leases over Port Botany and Port Kembla to a consortium of Industry Funds Management, AustralianSuper, QSuper and Tawreed Investments. The corporations retained harbourmaster and maritime safety functions, but were unprofitable in their initial form.

Twelve months later, when the Port of Newcastle was leased, the lessons from Botany and Kembla were applied, leaving a profitable residual NPC. On 1 July 2014, the residual Newcastle, Sydney and Port Kembla port corporations were amalgamated into the Port Authority of New South Wales.
