= White Bay (New South Wales) =

Bay in Sydney, Australia

Coordinates: 33°51′50″S 151°11′02″E

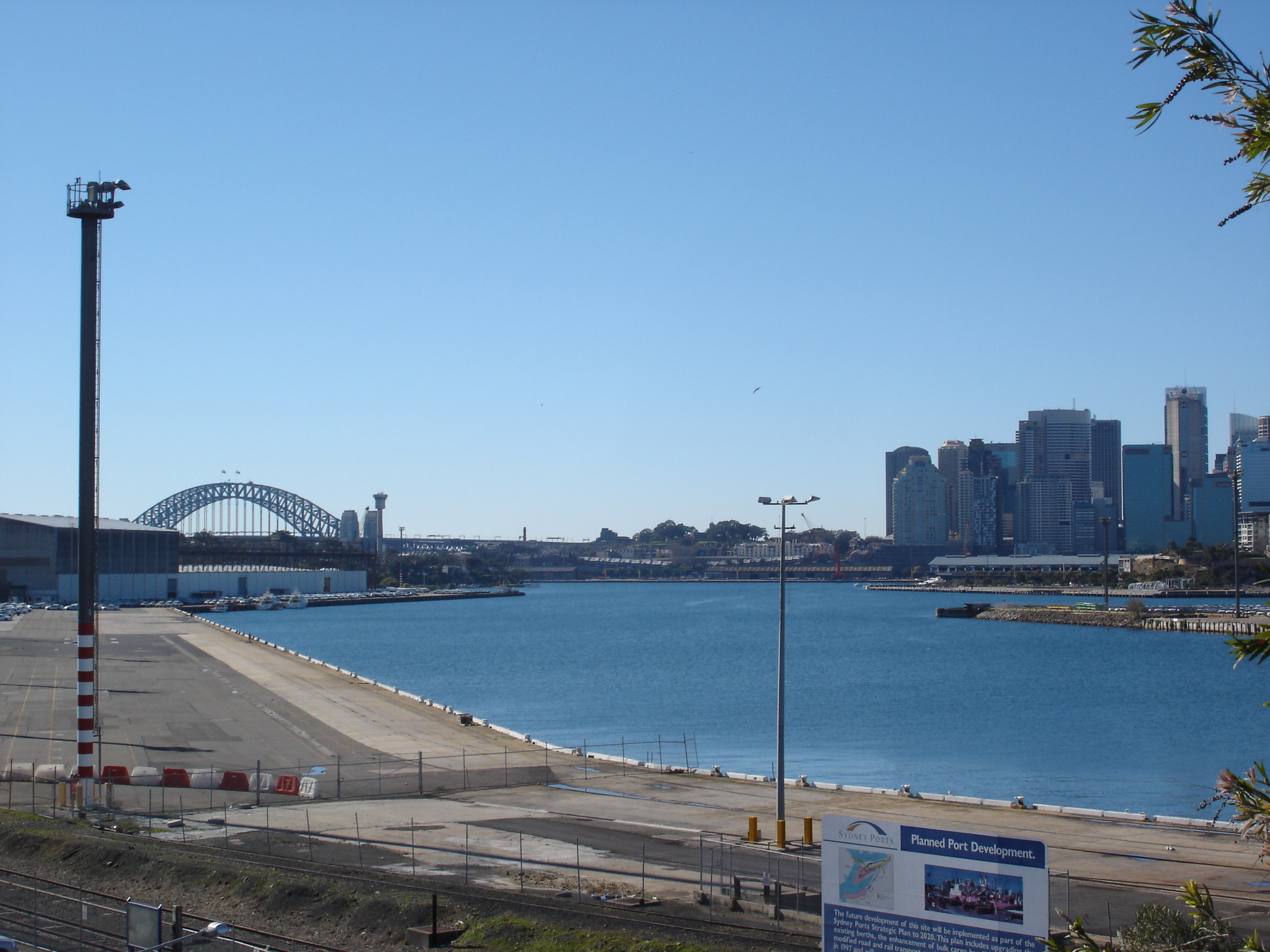
White Bay looking towards the Sydney central business district and Harbour Bridge

White Bay is a bay on Sydney Harbour with a surrounding locality near the suburbs of Balmain and Rozelle in the Inner West of Sydney, New South Wales, Australia.

== History ==
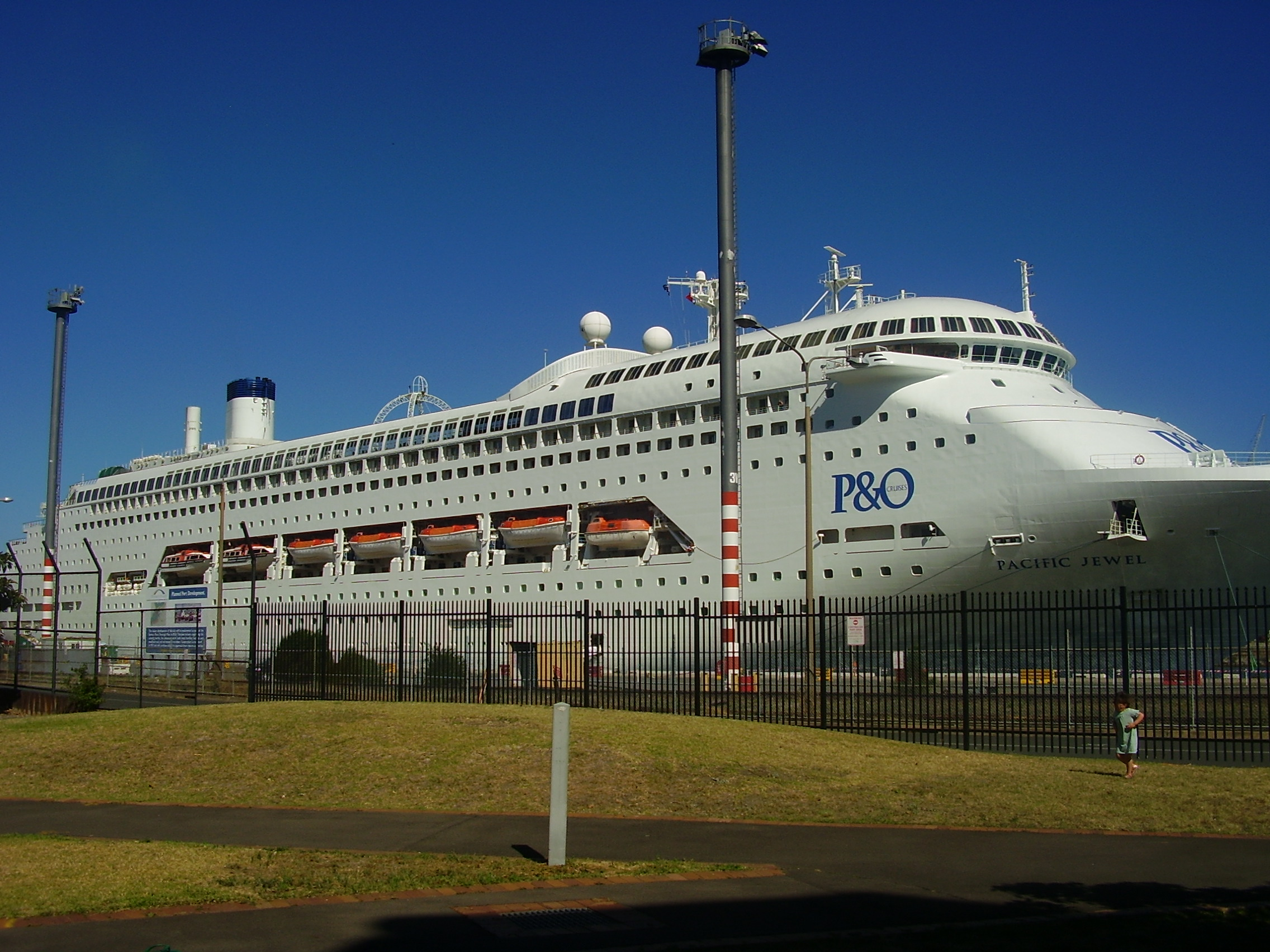
P&O's Pacific Jewel docked at White Bay Wharves in 2009

White Bay is named after John White, the naval surgeon aboard the First Fleet to Australia in 1788. Since the nineteenth century the bay has been used for water-based transport and industrial activities. In conjunction with adjacent Glebe Island it has been a multipurpose port, owned and controlled by the Government of New South Wales since 1901.

White Bay was the first port in New South Wales to handle containerised shipping, opening in 1969 on reclaimed land. In the 1970s there were several companies operating container terminals, with rail transfer via the Metropolitan Goods line to larger holding yards at Chullora. Container handling moved out of White Bay in late 2004 moving to Port Botany.

The White Bay Cruise Terminal opened in April 2013 replacing a terminal at Wharf 8 on Darling Harbour. White Bay is also used for marine refuelling.

== Landmarks ==
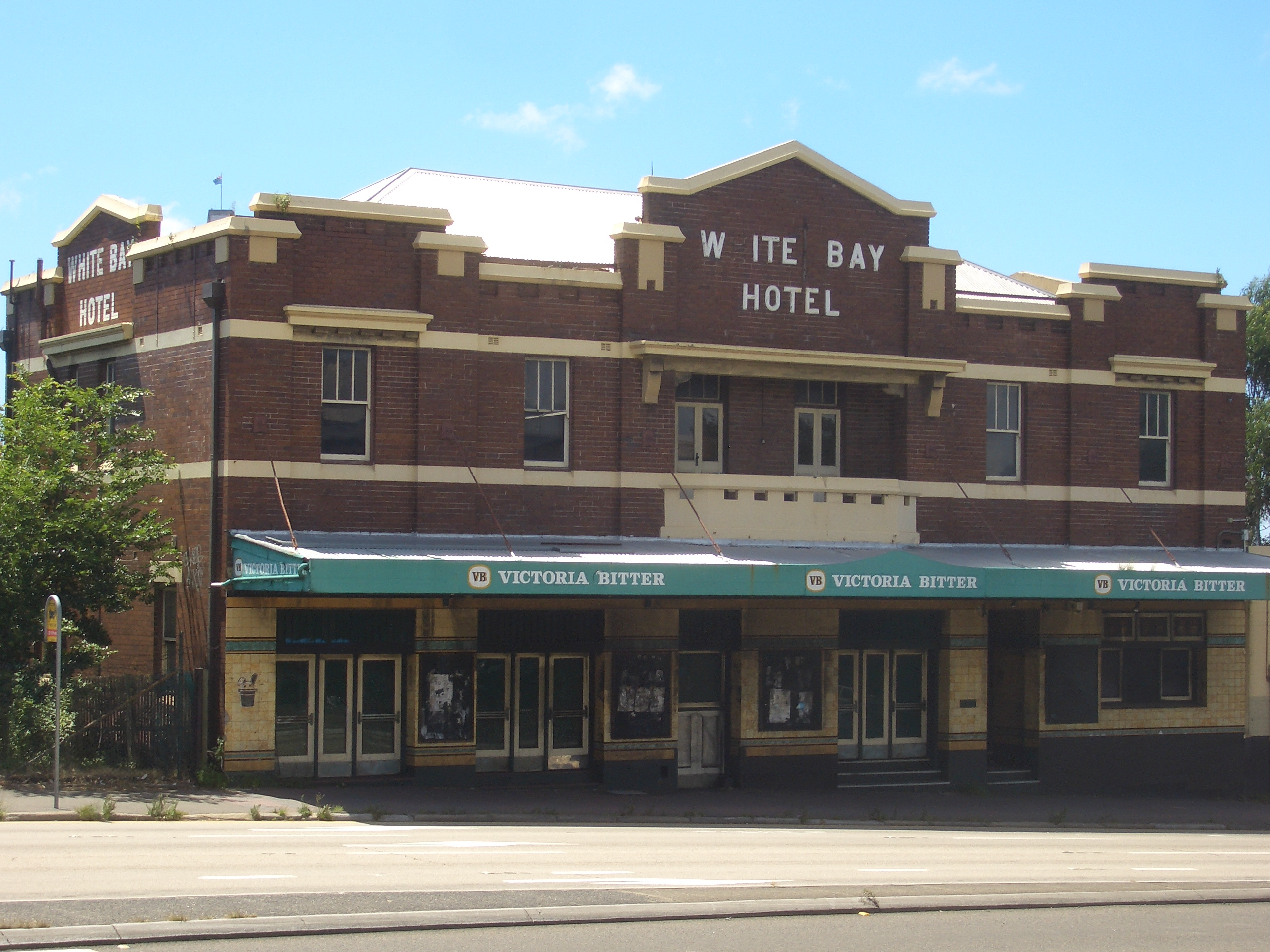
White Bay Hotel 2008

The White Bay Hotel was a historic hotel on Victoria Road. It was built in 1861, rebuilt in 1916, and refurbished in 1925 and 1933. It closed in 1992, landlocked by roads and with no local workers. Until 2004 it served only as a platform for billboards advertising to traffic on the Western Distributor, and on 5 September 2008 was destroyed by a suspicious fire and immediately demolished. The state government bought the site in June 2010. The rubble was removed on 29 October 2010 and the block levelled.

The recently refurbished White Bay Power Station dominates the landscape. On the eastern side stands the Anzac Bridge, which was completed in 1996 and is the main arterial link between the inner west and Sydney city. Below the bridge lies its disused predecessor, the Glebe Island Bridge, which opened in 1903.

== Gallery ==
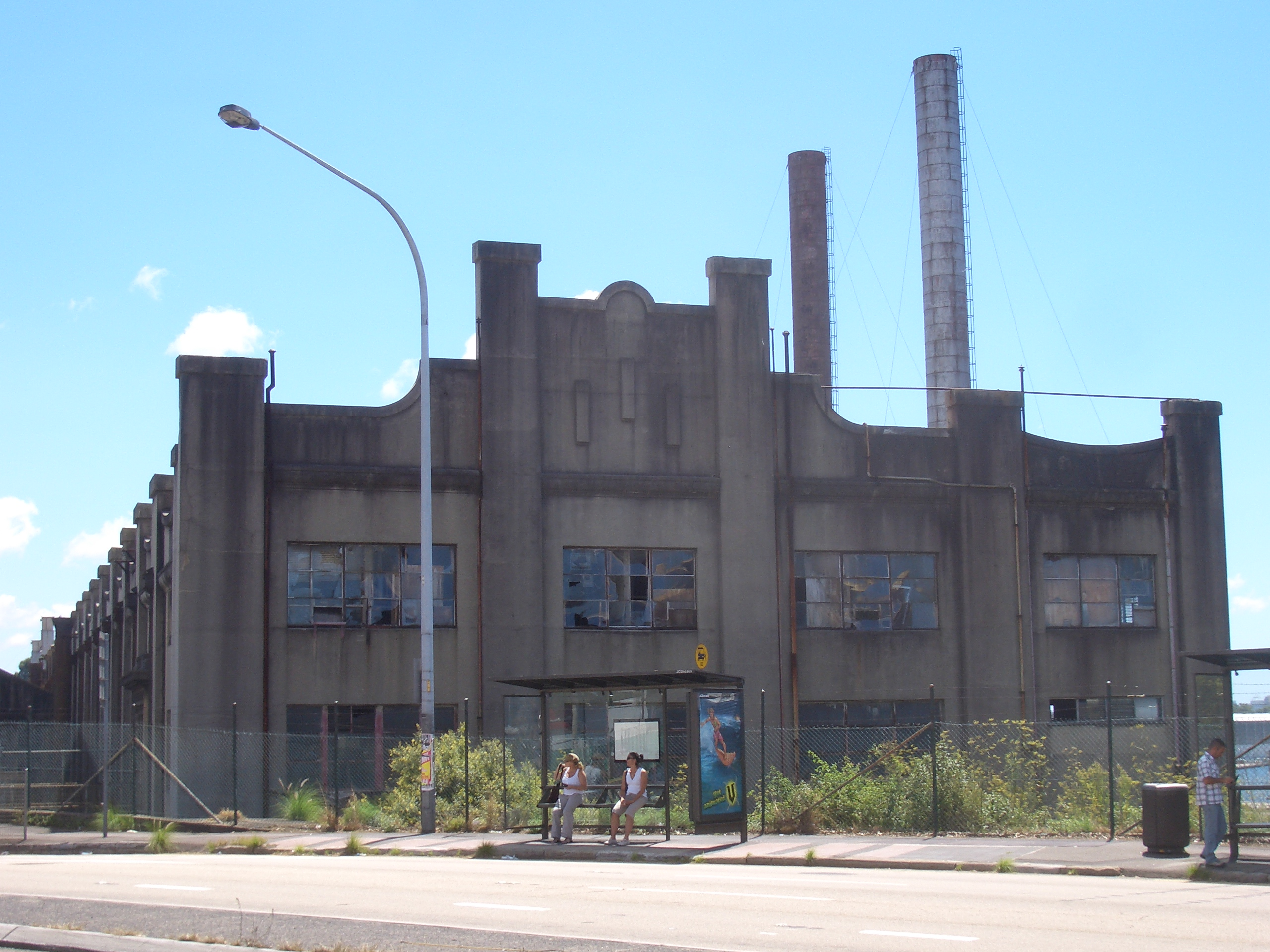
White Bay Power Station

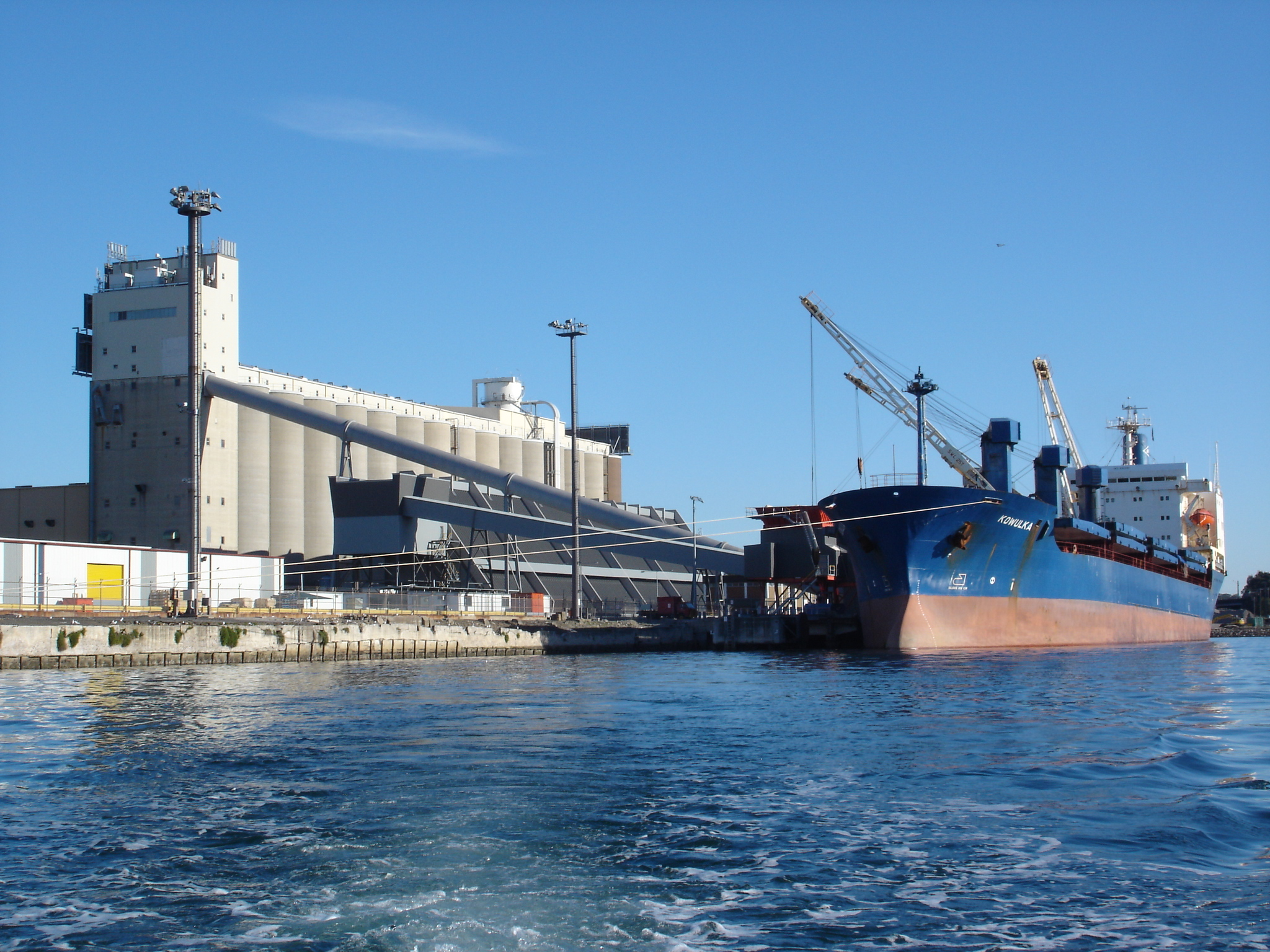
Glebe Island grain silos

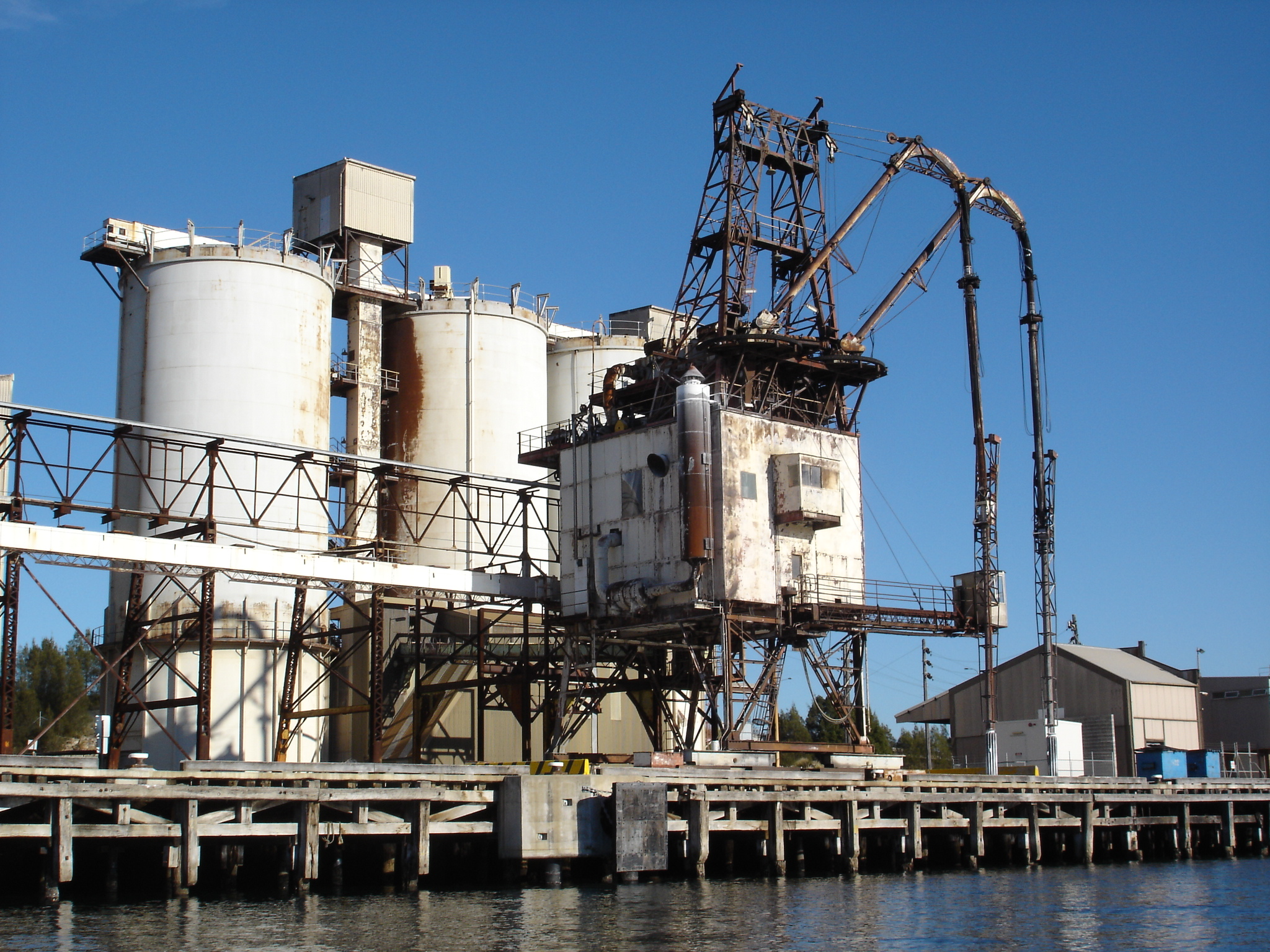
Balmain Coal Loader

White Bay Hotel demolition

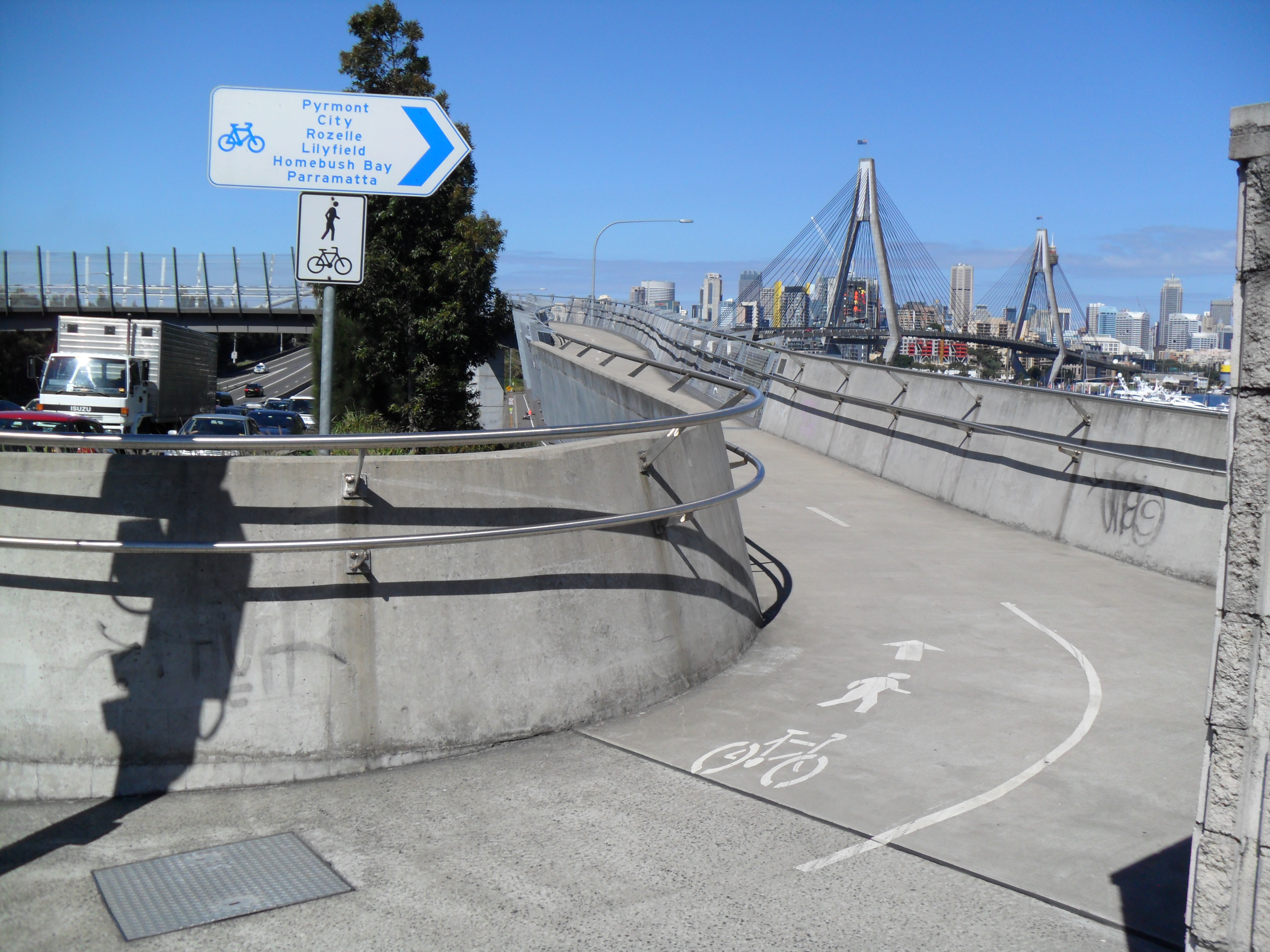
Beatrice Bush Bridge, bike and pedestrian access over Victoria Road

== Notable residents ==
For 25 years from 1971 to just before her death in 1996, one of Sydney's true characters, Beatrice Olive ("Beattie") Bush, sold papers to passing motorists at the junction of The Crescent (City West Link) and Victoria Road. Every morning in all weather, wearing Balmain Tigers socks and running shoes, Beatrice was part of the drive to work for thousands of motorists.

The 1984 song The White Bay Paper Seller by Judy Small was written about Beatrice. The 1986 painting Beatrice the Paper-Seller of the White Bay Intersection by Susan Dorothea White shows Beatrice Bush running between the cars and trucks, selling newspapers in the rain. The 2004 documentary, The Paper Queen by Julie Nebauer documented her life. In 2005 a new cycle bridge crossing Victoria Road at the intersection of The Crescent was named the Beatrice Bush Bridge in her honour. Her newspaper trolley, hat, gloves and other clothing items are held in the Powerhouse Museum collection in Sydney.
