= White Bay Cruise Terminal =

Cruise ship terminal in Sydney, Australia

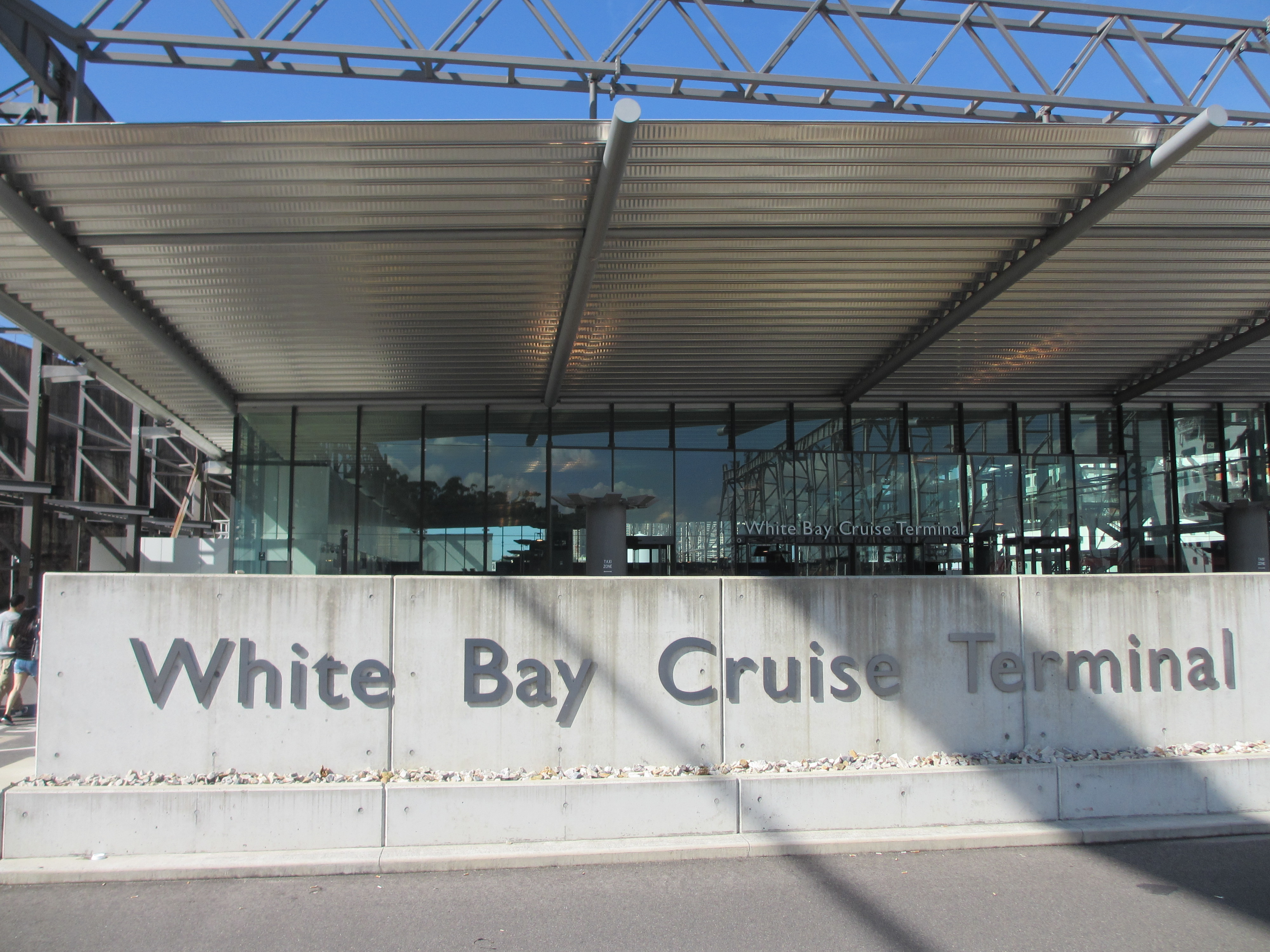
- Terminal entrance

General information
- Location: James Craig Road, White Bay, Sydney, Australia
- Coordinates: 33.8606°S 151.1887°E
- Named for: White Bay
- Opened: 15 April 2013
- Owner: Port Authority of New South Wales

Design and construction
- Architecture firm: Johnson Pilton Walker
- Developer: Sydney Ports
- Engineer: Taylor Thomson Whitting
- Main contractor: AW Edwards

The White Bay Cruise Terminal is a terminal for cruise ships on Sydney Harbour. The terminal is located at the eastern end of the White Bay wharves, on the northern shore of White Bay. It opened on 15 April 2013 as a replacement for Wharf 8 on Darling Harbour which closed to make way for the Barangaroo development.

The terminal building was constructed within and amongst a twin-beam gantry structure originally constructed in the 1960s for gantry cranes for container use. In October 2013 it won the transport section at the World Architecture Festival. The Overseas Passenger Terminal remains as Sydney's primary terminal, with the White Bay Cruise Terminal only taking those vessels which can fit under the Sydney Harbour Bridge.

In March 2022 it was announced that shore power would be installed at the terminal. As at September 2026, a two storey onshore power supply facility was under construction. It will be the first shore powered cruise terminal in Australia.
