= Glebe Island =

Area in Sydney Harbour, Australia

Coordinates: 33°52′01″S 151°11′02″E

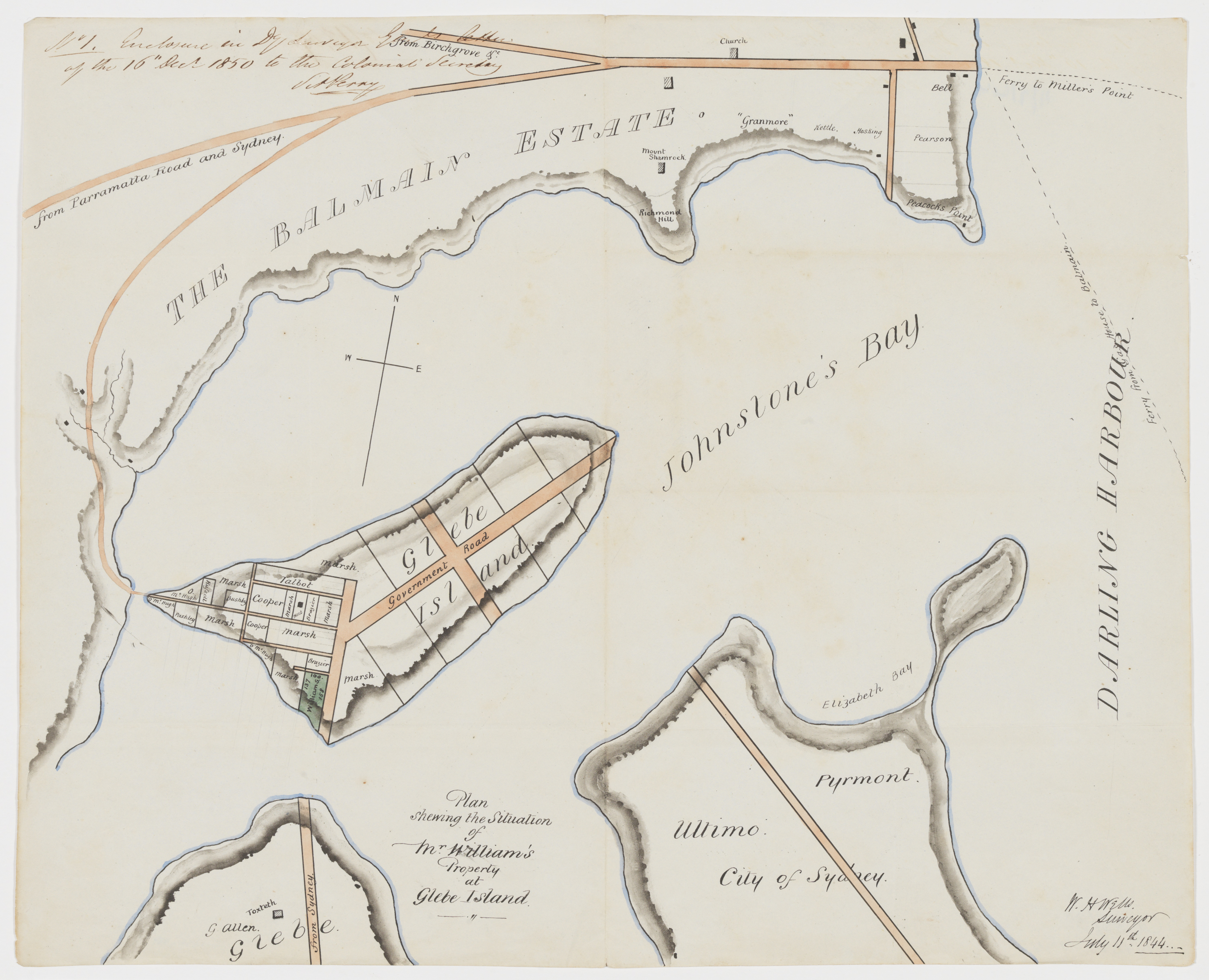
Map of property at Glebe Island in 1844

Interactive map with location.

Glebe Island is a port facility in Sydney Harbour and, in association with the adjacent White Bay facility, was the primary receiving venue for imported cars and dry bulk goods in Sydney until 2008. It is surrounded by White, Johnstons, and Rozelle bays. Whilst retaining its original title as an "island", it has long been infilled to the shoreline of the suburb of Rozelle and connected by the Glebe Island Bridge, and its replacement the Anzac Bridge, to Pyrmont.

== History ==
=== Abattoirs and bridges ===
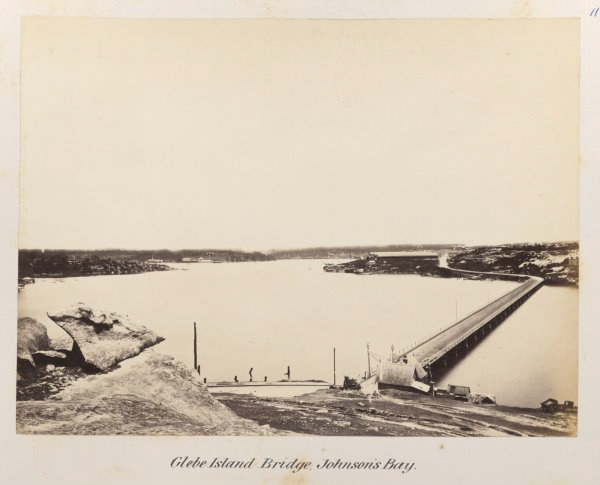
The original Glebe Island Bridge, photographed in 1878–9, looking south west from Pyrmont to Rozelle Bay and Glebe Island

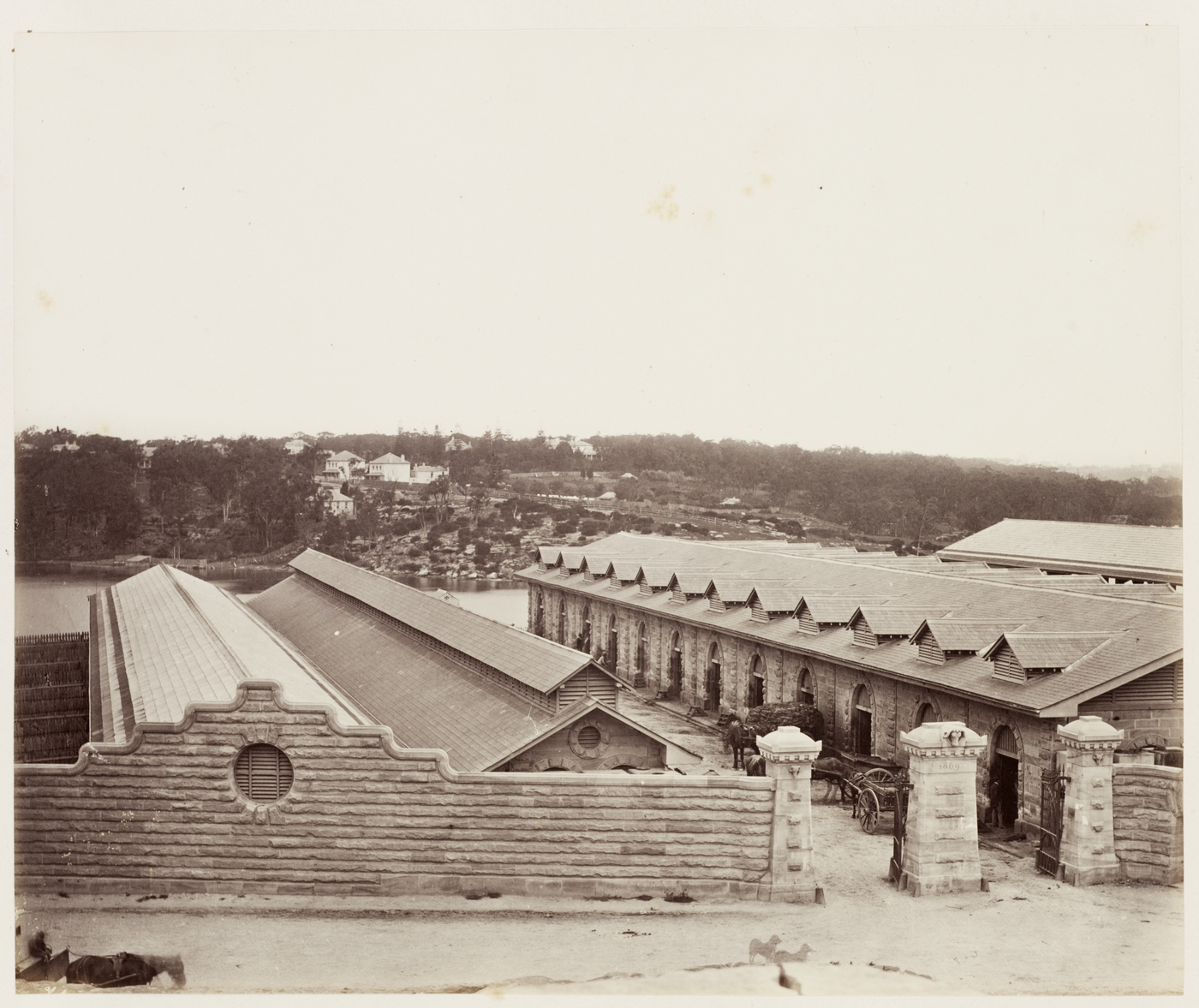
Abattoirs on Glebe Island in 1872

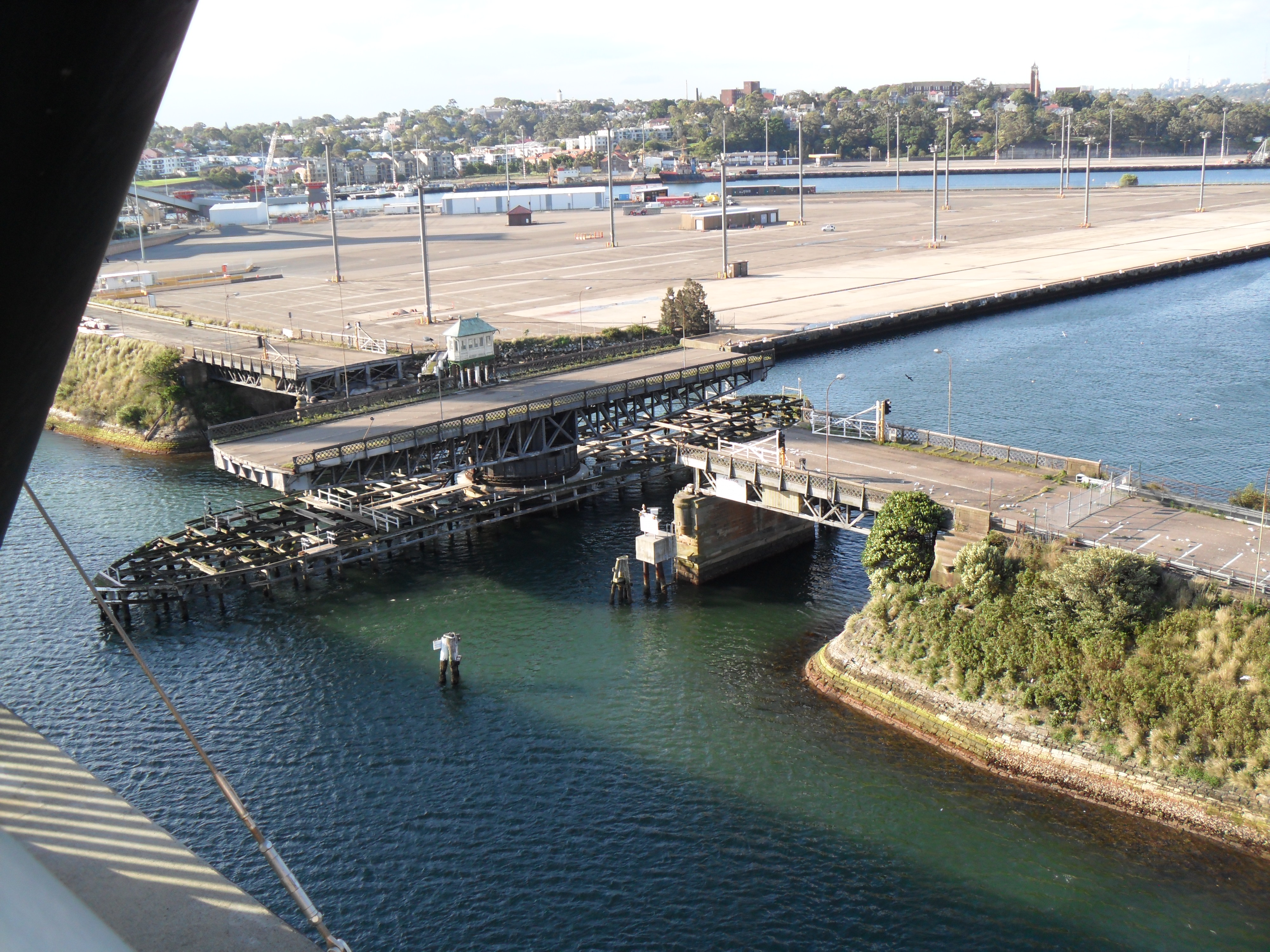
Glebe Island and the 1903 Glebe Island Bridge

The rocky outcrop known as Glebe Island was originally accessible from the Balmain shoreline only at low tide, until a causeway was laid in the 1840s. Surveyor William Wells created a subdivision for the Balmain end of the island in 1841, with four intended streets and six sections containing a total of 86 lots. The subdivision did not eventuate.

In 1850–1854, Colonial Architect Edmund Blacket designed stone buildings for a public abattoir on the island. According to Joan Kerr, Blacket's chosen architecture was Norman in inspiration – round-headed openings and simple decoration. Kerr states that the abattoir was almost certainly based on an American design.

On 7 September 1860, Balmain Council resolved to approach the owners of the unsold parts of the Balmain Estate for a grant of land to build a road to the island. The Pyrmont Bridge Company built a low-level timber-framed bridge that connected the island to Pyrmont, and thus to the city, in 1862.

The abattoirs featured prominently in the 1882 Royal Commission into noxious and offensive trades, instigated by complaints from Balmain and Glebe Point residents. The commission found that in 1882, 524,415 sheep, 69,991 cattle, 31,269 pigs and 8,348 calves were slaughtered there.

On 28 June 1903 the new bridge to Pyrmont, designed by Percy Allan, Assistant Engineer for Bridges in the NSW Department of Public Works, opened. Like the ground-breaking Pyrmont Bridge being built at the same time, the second Glebe Island Bridge was a swing bridge swivelling on a massive central stone pivot-pier with timber-trussed side spans. The two bridges "are among the structures standing as monuments" to Allan's skill. Under the Local Government Act 1906, the 14-hectare (34-acre) Glebe Island was added to the Municipality of Balmain.

=== Wharves and silos ===
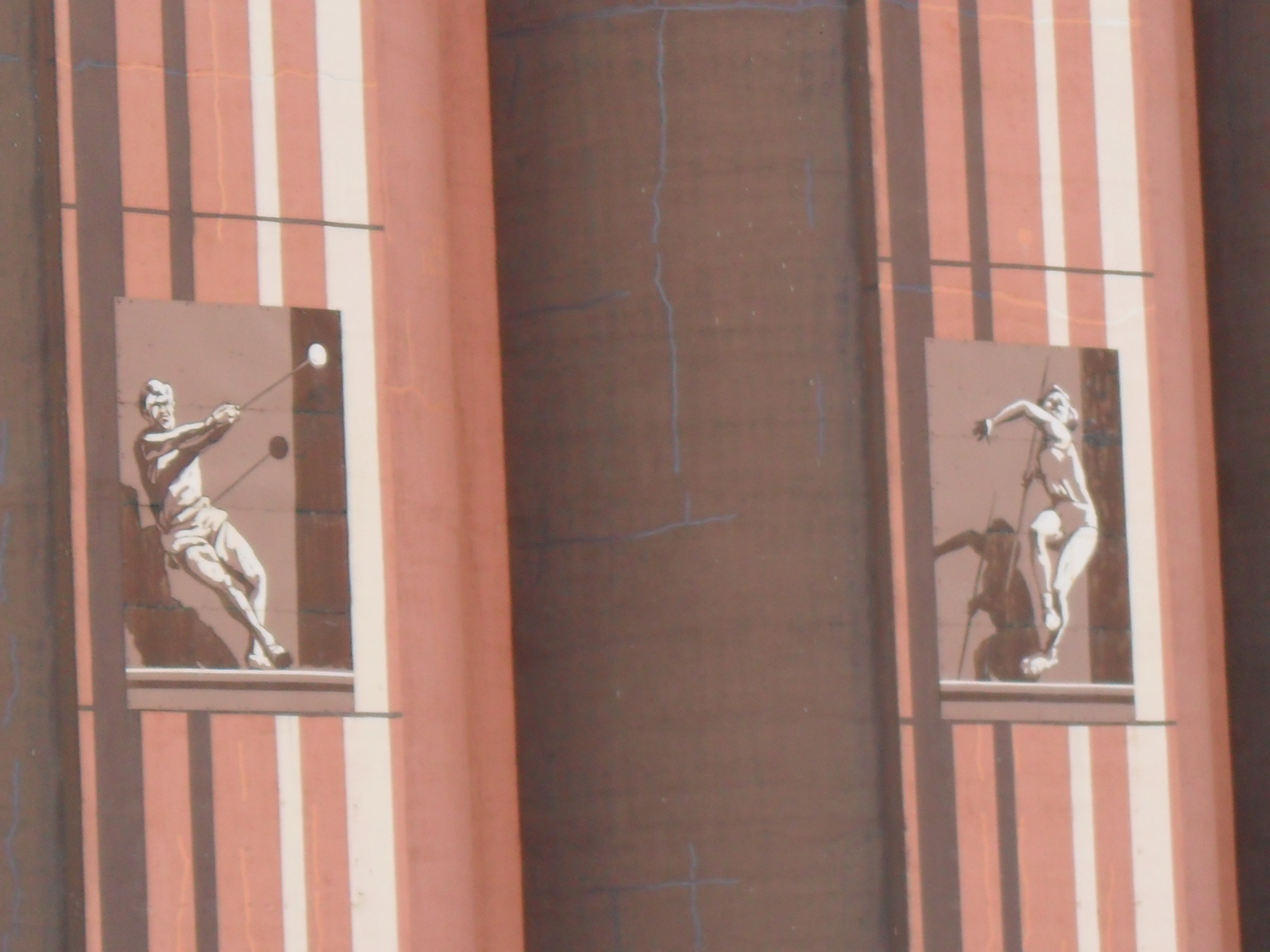
Athletic figures, Glebe Island silos, Rozelle

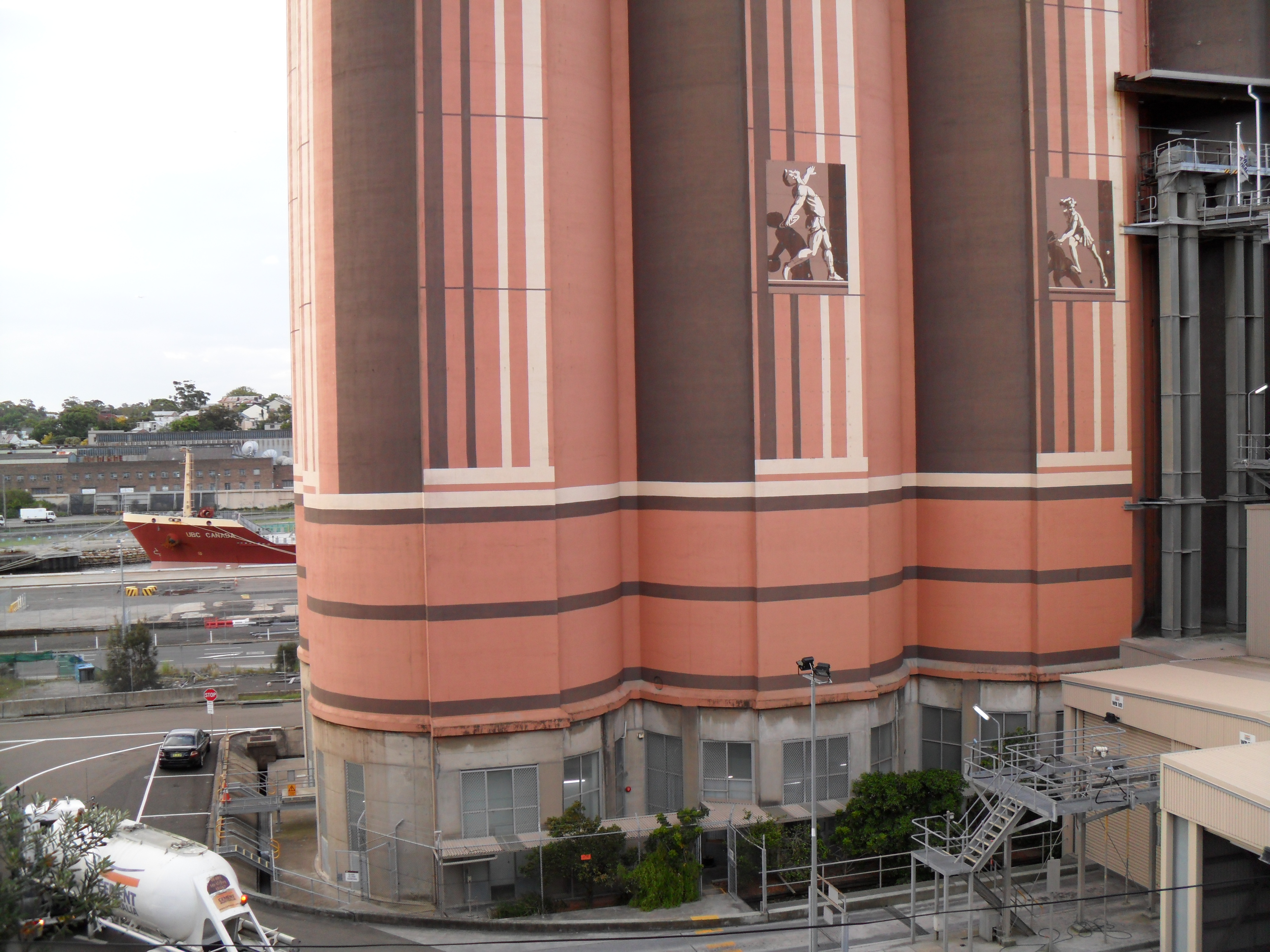
Glebe Island showing a portion of silo complex and White Bay at left.

From 1912, the Sydney Harbour Trust and Maritime Services Board planned broadside wharfage at Balmain East and along the southern shore of Balmain, including Glebe Island. Also in 1912 the Metropolitan Meat Industry Board resolved to abolish the abattoirs and build a new facility at Homebush. By 1915 Robert Saunders, the Pyrmont quarry master, had been commissioned to level the island to make it suitable for wharves. Saunders's firm dumped a great quantity of excavated ballast at the eastern end of the island for wharfage. Many cubic feet of quality dimension stone, however, were carefully cut away and almost certainly used for construction projects. Some 250 of Saunders's men were still working on the island in 1920.

Glebe Island was an early success for the harbour trust. Wharves were built on three sides of the levelled rocky outcrop from 1912. The reconstructed fourth side was attached to the Rozelle shoreline as part of the extensive reclamation of Rozelle Bay and White Bay which had begun in the 1890s.

Glebe Island became the site of a grain elevator and tall concrete silos, operated from 1921 by the Grain Elevators Board. The 1958 Australian Encyclopaedia records that the bulk wheat terminal had a capacity of 7,500,000 bushels (202,500 tonnes). During World War II much of the island was commandeered for the main United States Army depot in Sydney. In February 1973, the final stage of the Glebe Island Container Terminal opened.

=== Industry to tourism ===
Bulk handling of grain continued until 1990 when the wheat terminal was transferred to Port Kembla and the wharfage remodelled for containerised cargo. Some silos were demolished, while since 1991 Cement Australia used 16 of them as a bulk cement terminal. On 3 December 1995 the high-level, cable-stayed, reinforced concrete six-lane Anzac Bridge spanning 345 metres between two 120-metre towers was built above the older Allan-designed Glebe Island Bridge. Until November 2008, the island was the Australian Amalgamated Terminals (AAT) facility for imported motor vehicles.

Discussions for rejuvenation of the now disused site are ongoing. In 2008 it was suggested by the Government of New South Wales that a tennis centre could be created to host the Australian Open tournament after Melbourne's existing contract expired in 2016. This plan was short-lived and in 2009 it was announced that White Bay Cruise Terminal would be renovated at the same time as the Barangaroo development to become a cruise ship terminal to alleviate pressure on the existing facilities at Darling Harbour and Circular Quay. This is a controversial decision with the local community largely due to traffic concerns and has been called a "good short term solution" by industry groups as most cruise ships currently being constructed would not be able to fit underneath the Sydney Harbour Bridge in order to reach the facility. On New Year's Eve 2011–12, the large empty space, conveniently located with a good view of the Sydney Harbour Bridge fireworks, was used for a major televised concert with headliners Jamiroquai, Culture Club and Pet Shop Boys. The old Glebe Island Bridge was included on the heritage list in 2013, lending more weight to calls for its retention as an active transport link.

In August 2013, construction began on an interim exhibition facility Sydney Exhibition Centre @ Glebe Island, which opened on 15 February 2014. The venue offered 20,000 square metres of space for large trade and consumer exhibitions and operated throughout the redevelopment of the Sydney Convention & Exhibition Centre. The site was cleared in 2017. In February 2018, the Port Authority of New South Wales announced plans for a major building materials handling complex.

The area forms part of the New South Wales Government's Bays Precinct urban renewal program.

In March 2026, the government announced that a new suburb would be created named Bays West. The government plans to create 8,500 new homes with affordable and essential worker housing included. It will be located near the Bays West metro station. Port operations currently taking place on Glebe Island are planned to cease no later than 2030.
