= Anzac Bridge =

Cable-stayed bridge in Sydney, New South Wales, Australia

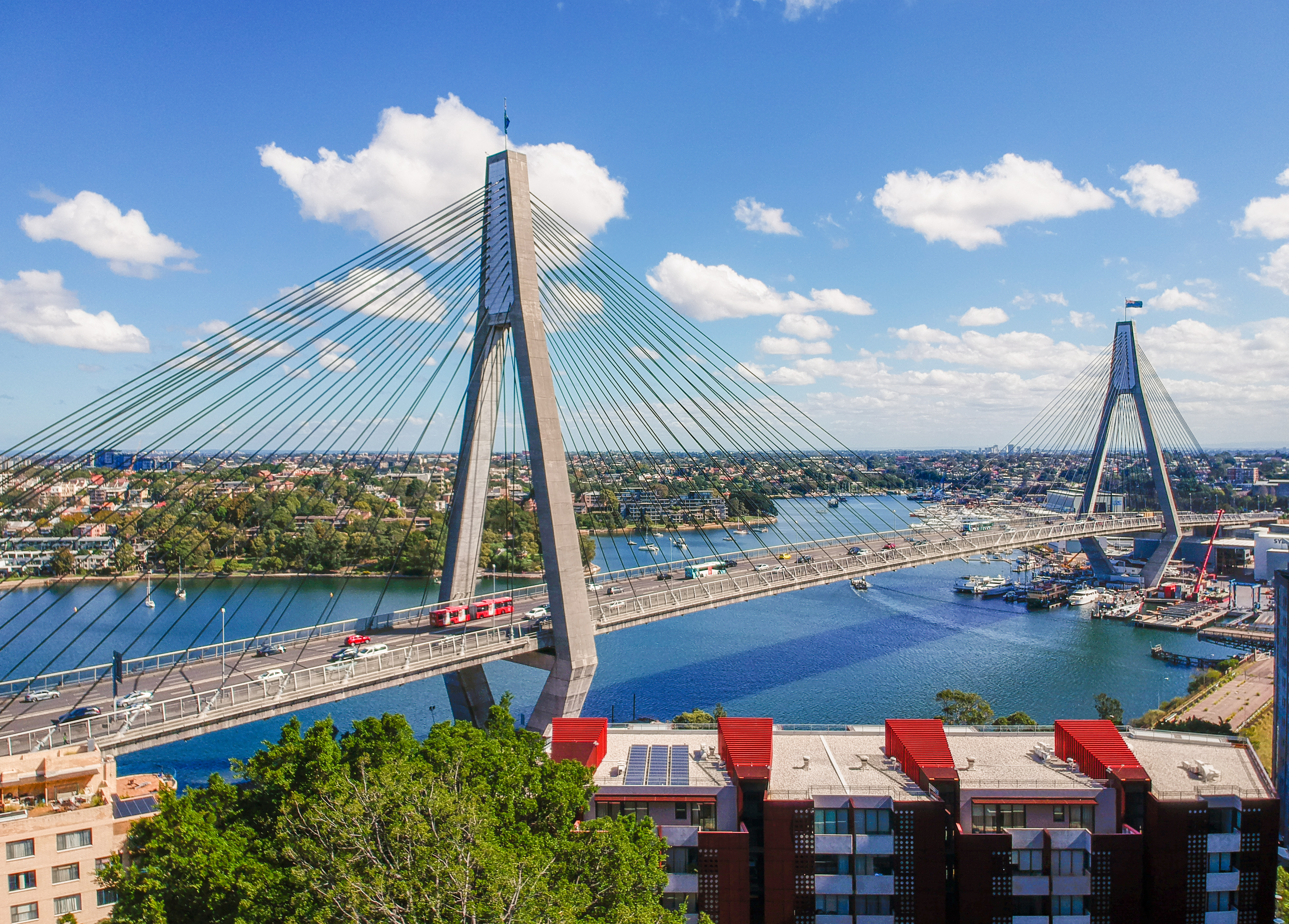
- Aerial view of the bridge
- Coordinates: 33°52′10″S 151°11′09″E
- Carries: Western Distributor: Motor vehicles; Pedestrians; Bicycles
- Crosses: Johnstons Bay
- Locale: Sydney, New South Wales, Australia
- Begins: Pyrmont (east)
- Ends: Glebe Island / Rozelle (west)
- Other name: New Glebe Island Bridge
- Named for: Australian and New Zealand Army Corps
- Owner: Transport for NSW

Characteristics
- Design: Cable-stayed
- Material: Concrete and steel
- Pier construction: Reinforced concrete
- Total length: 805 metres (2,641 ft)
- Width: 32.2 metres (106 ft)
- Longest span: 345 metres (1,132 ft)
- Piers in water: 2
- No. of lanes: 8; plus grade-separated shared footpath and cycleway

History
- Contracted lead designer: Roads & Traffic Authority
- Constructed by: Baulderstone
- Construction cost: A$170 million
- Opened: 3 December 1995
- Replaces: Glebe Island Bridge

Location
- Interactive map of Anzac Bridge

The Anzac Bridge is an eight-lane cable-stayed bridge that carries the Western Distributor (A4) across Johnstons Bay between Pyrmont and Glebe Island (part of the suburb of Rozelle, New South Wales), on the western fringe of the Sydney central business district, New South Wales, Australia. The bridge forms part of the road network leading from the central business district, the Sydney Harbour Bridge, and Cross City Tunnel to the Inner West and Northern Suburbs.

== History ==
=== Glebe Island bridges ===
There were two bridges over Johnstons Bay before the construction of the Anzac Bridge.

The first bridge was constructed as part of a project to move the abattoirs out of central Sydney, and to construct public abattoirs at Glebe Island. The first pile of the original bridge was driven in October 1860. The bridge was opened in 1862 and was a timber beam bridge 318.6 metres (1,045 feet 5 inches) long and 8.5 m (28 ft) wide with a 12 m (40 ft) swing section on the eastern side. It replaced a double steam punt crossing.

The second Glebe Island Bridge was an electrically operated swing bridge opened in 1903, the year after the opening of the new Pyrmont Bridge over Sydney's Darling Harbour, which has a similar design. The bridge was designed by Percy Allan of the New South Wales Public Works Department who also designed the Pyrmont Bridge. Delays due to increasing traffic, which were exacerbated by having to close a major arterial road to allow the movement of shipping into Blackwattle Bay, led to the construction of the present-day Anzac Bridge. The 1903 bridge is still standing, but there is no access to pedestrians or vehicular traffic.

=== Anzac Bridge ===
The stay cable design concept development and final design for the new bridge were carried out by a team from the Roads & Traffic Authority, led by their Chief Bridge Engineer Ray Wedgwood and the construction by Baulderstone. The bridge was opened to traffic on 3 December 1995 as the Glebe Island Bridge.

The bridge was given its current name on Remembrance Day in 1998 to honour the memory of the soldiers of the Australian and New Zealand Army Corps (known as Anzacs) who served in World War I. An Australian Flag flies atop the eastern pylon and a New Zealand Flag flies atop the western pylon. A bronze memorial statue of an Australian Anzac soldier ("digger") holding a Lee–Enfield rifle in the "rest on arms reverse" drill position was placed on the western end of the bridge on Anzac Day in 2000. A statue of a New Zealand soldier was added to a plinth across the road from the Australian Digger, facing towards the east, and was unveiled by Prime Minister of New Zealand Helen Clark in the presence of Premier of New South Wales Morris Iemma on Sunday 27 April 2008.

== Description ==
The bridge is 32.2 m (105 ft 8 in) wide and the main span is 345 m (1,132 ft) long. The reinforced concrete pylons are 120 m (390 ft) high and support the deck by two planes of stay cables. Initially the stay cables were plagued by vibrations which have since been resolved by the addition of thin stabilising cables between the stay cables.

There is a grade-separated shared pedestrian footpath and cycleway located on the northern side of the bridge, making possible a walk from Glebe Point Road, down Bridge Road, over the bridge and round Blackwattle Bay back to Glebe Point Road.

The bridge can carry a maximum of 180,000 cars per day. It reached its maximum capacity in 2002, only seven years after it was finished and consistent with the principles of induced demand of traffic.

The bridge is regularly patrolled by security guards as a counter-terrorist attack measure. Security cameras also monitor the walkway.

The bridge has a speed limit of 60 kilometres per hour (37 miles per hour): it was reduced from 70 km/h (43 mph) in January 2005. Also prior to that date, the bridge had seven traffic lanes (4 eastbound, 3 westbound).

Originally, there were bus stops at the western end of the bridge, but they were removed because buses pulling out from the stops created a hazard as they merged with other traffic moving at (or close to) the speed limit. The Australian Anzac statue on the northern side of the bridge is adjacent to the former city-bound bus stop; the New Zealand Anzac statue was installed within the ramp area of the former stop on the southern side.

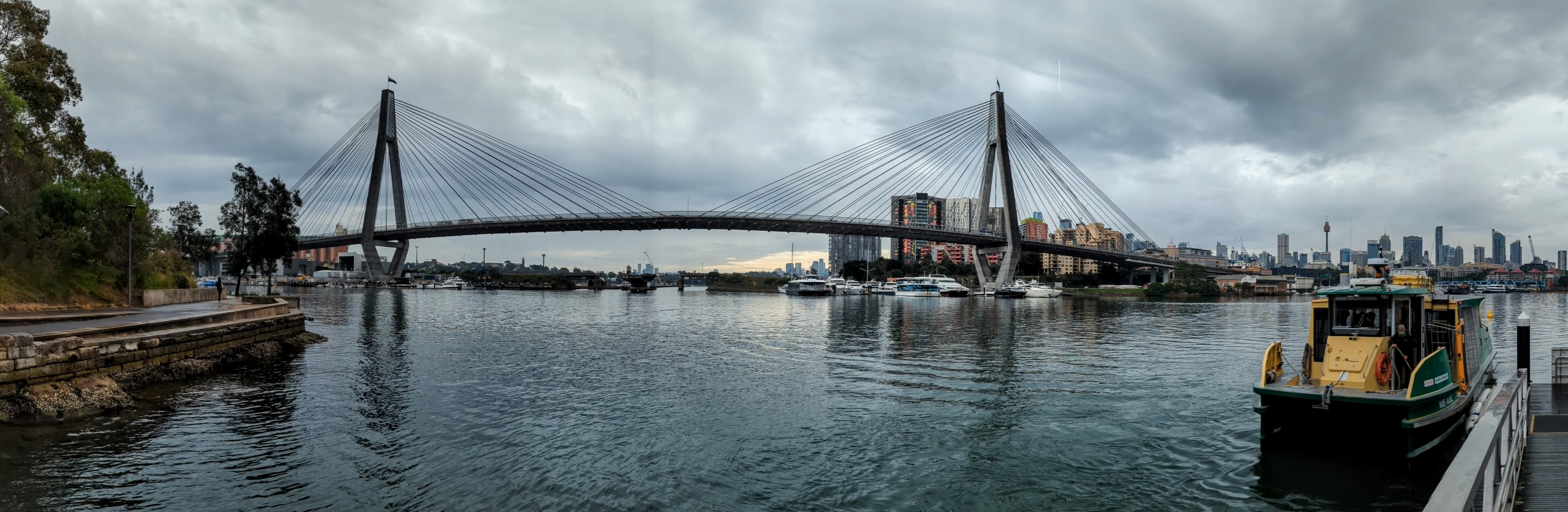
Panoramic view from Blackwattle Bay ferry wharf, Glebe, with F10 ferry Me-Mel

== Use in popular culture ==
The bridge has been used in a number of artistic works including:

- The bridge was used in the Looking for Alibrandi (1999) movie scene where the title character, Josephine Alibrandi, and her date Jacob Coote rode across the bridge on Jacob's motorcycle.
- Deni Hines' song "It's Alright" (1995) features the nearly completed bridge in the music video group dance sequences, the filming of which taking place a few months before the bridge's December 1995 opening.
- You Am I's song "Purple Sneakers" from the band's album Hi Fi Way (1995) opens with the lyric "Had a scratch only you could itch, underneath the Glebe Point bridge". The Glebe Island Bridge was still under construction when Tim Rogers wrote and recorded the song in 1994, with the bridge's name change to 'Anzac Bridge' not occurring until 1998.

== Gallery ==
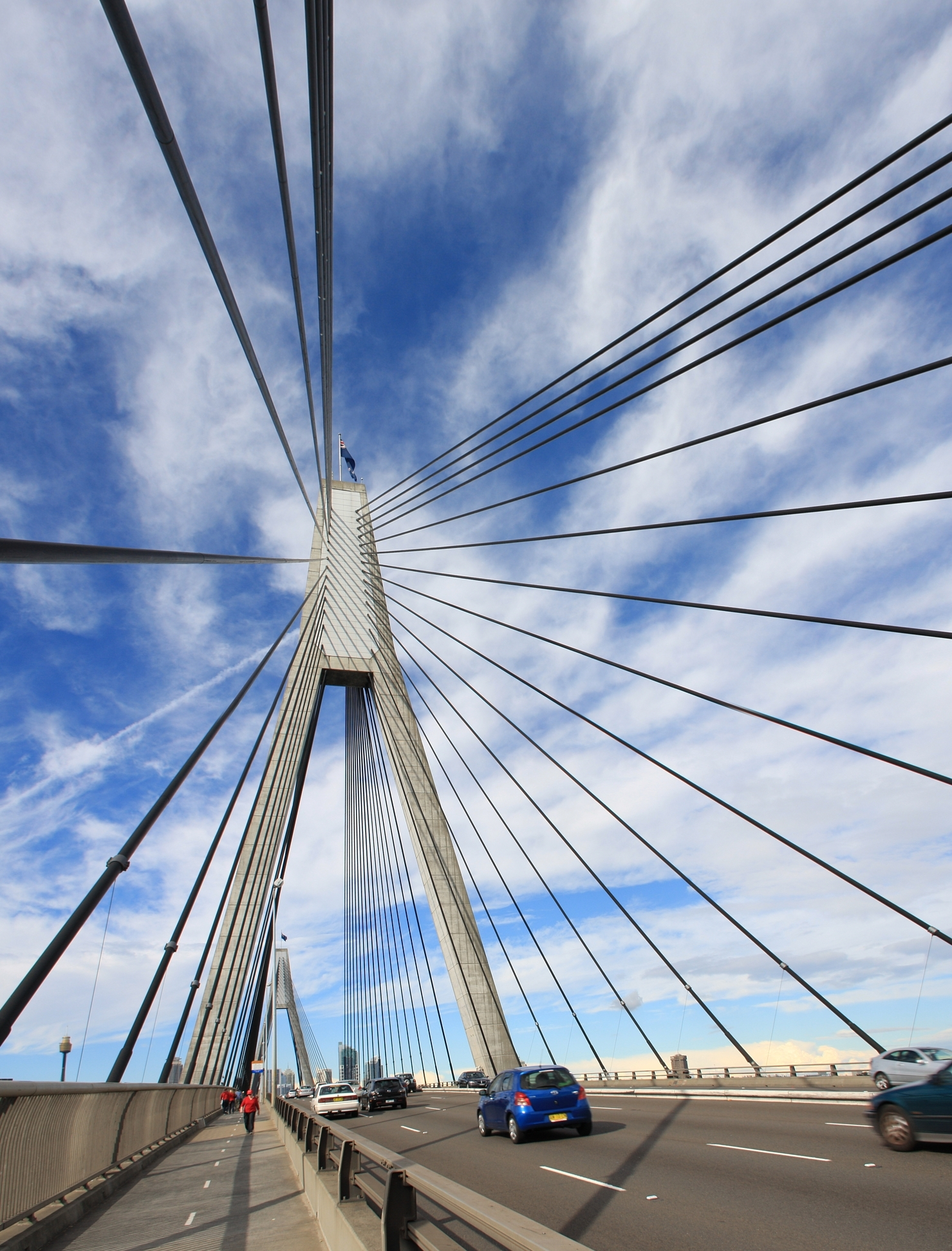
Anzac Bridge pylons and cables

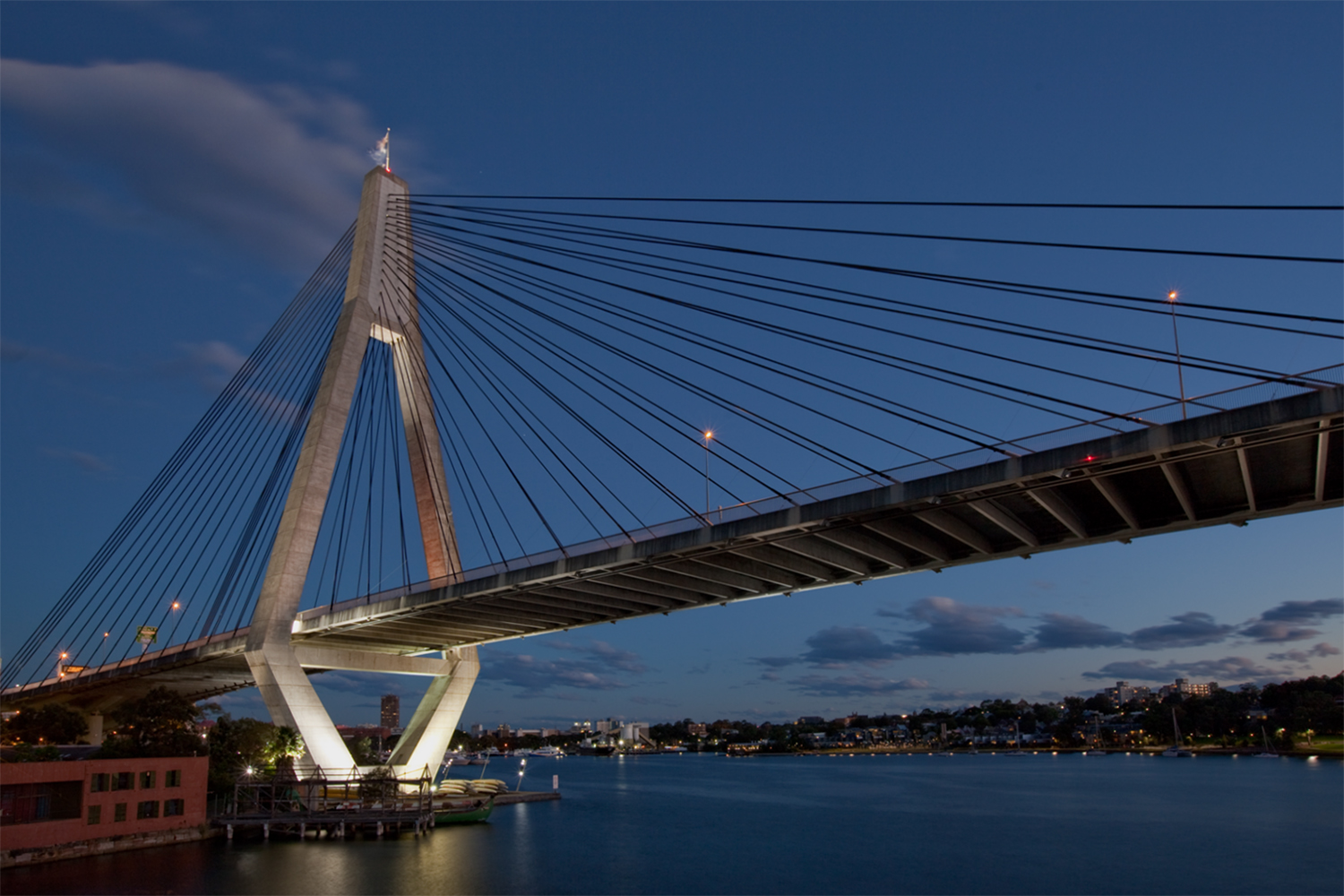
Anzac Bridge at dusk.

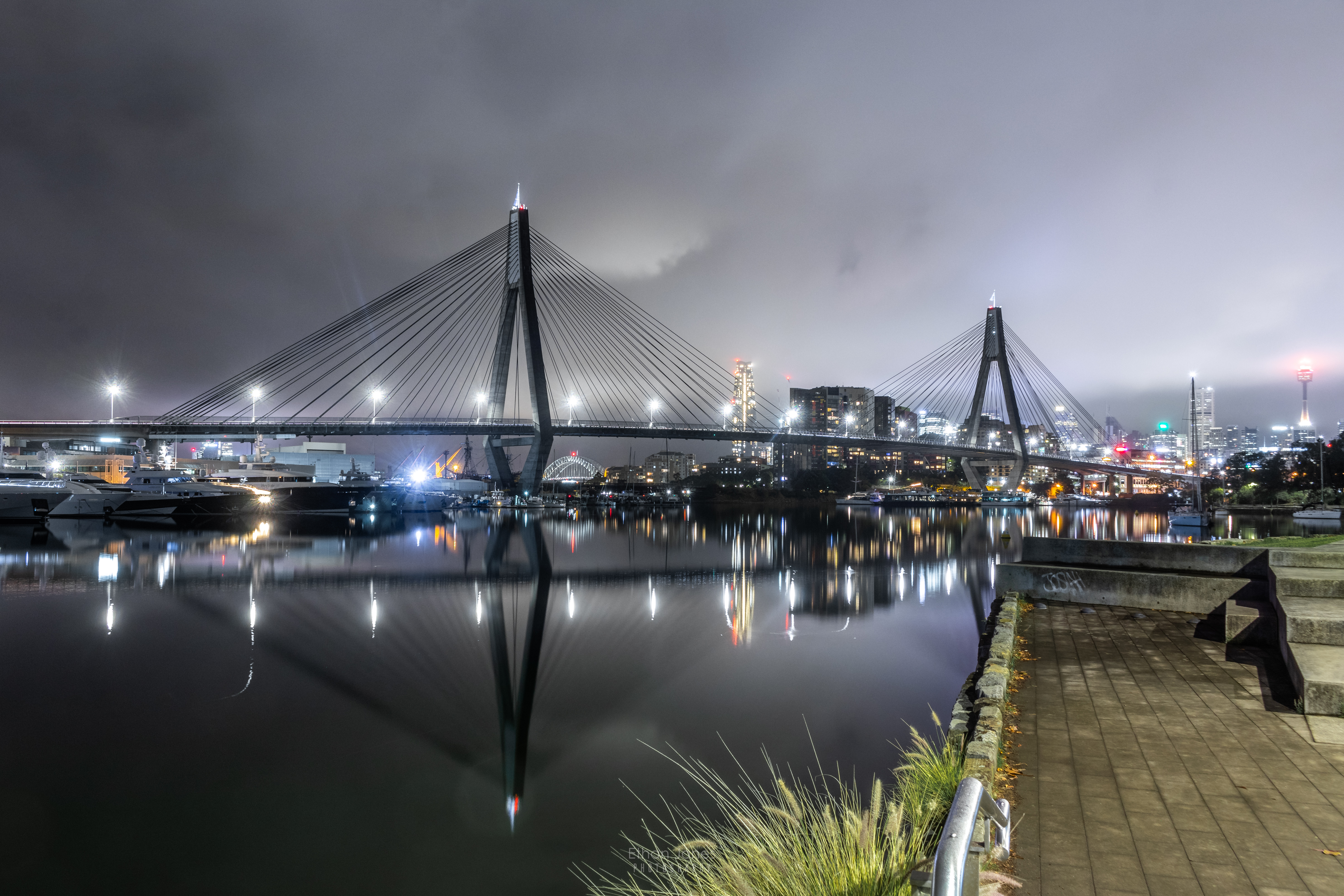
ANZAC Bridge at night from Glebe Point.

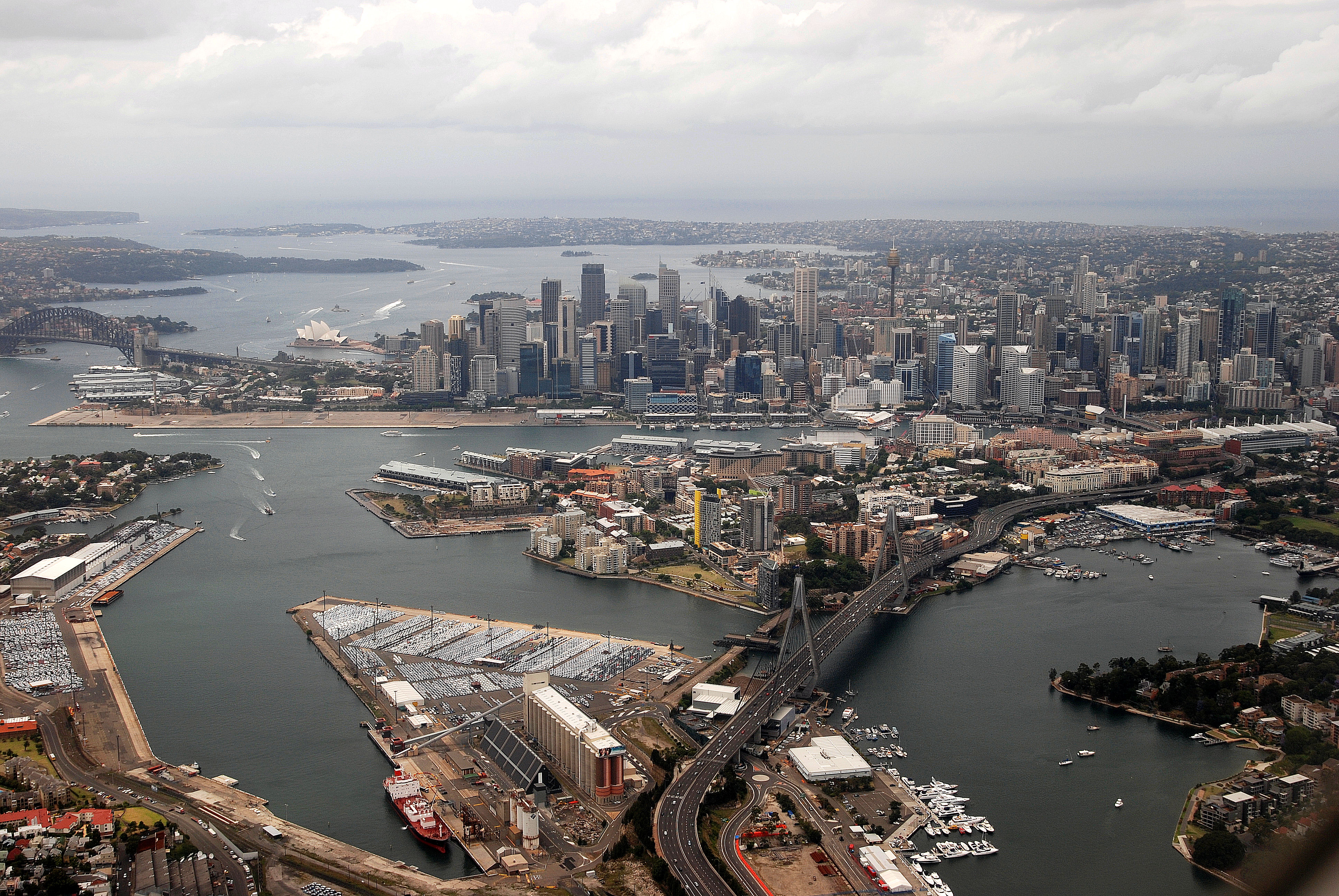
Aerial view of Sydney Harbour from the west in 2008. Anzac Bridge is visible at lower centre right, while the disused (second) Glebe Island Bridge is visible immediately to its left.

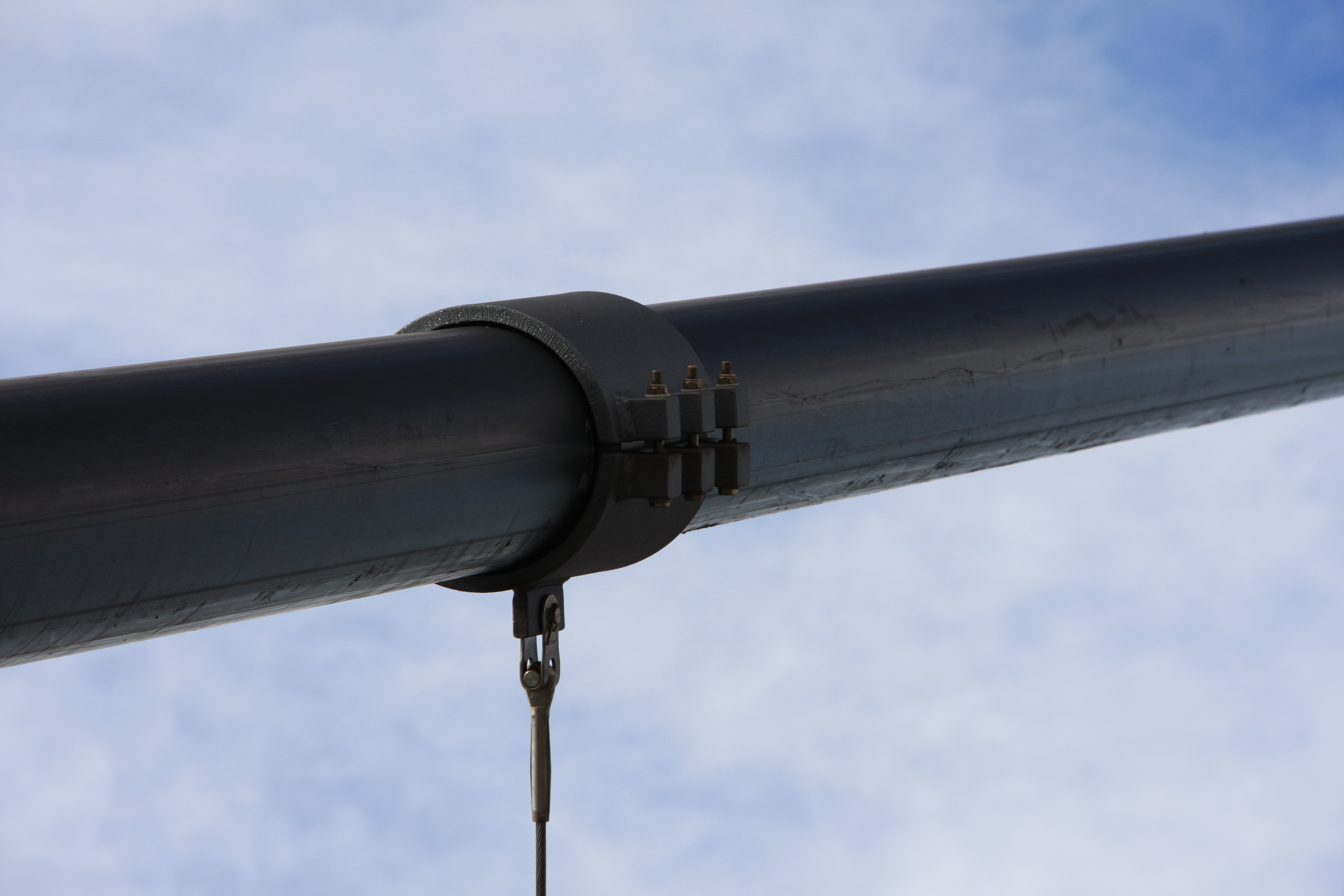
The Bridge's stay cables were initially plagued by vibrations, since resolved by the addition of thin stabilizing cables (pictured) between the much larger stay cables.

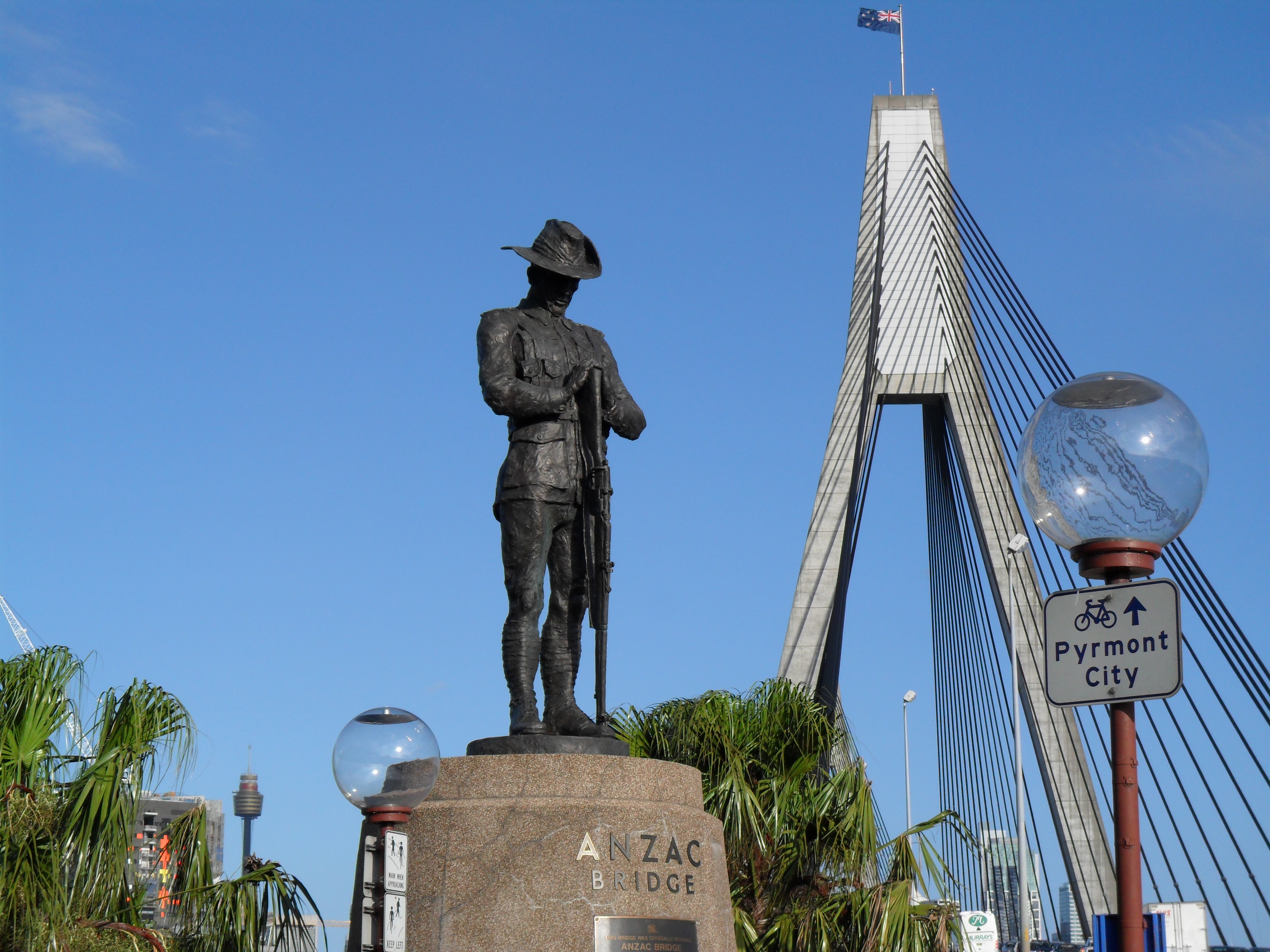
The Australian Anzac statue on the north-western side of the bridge.

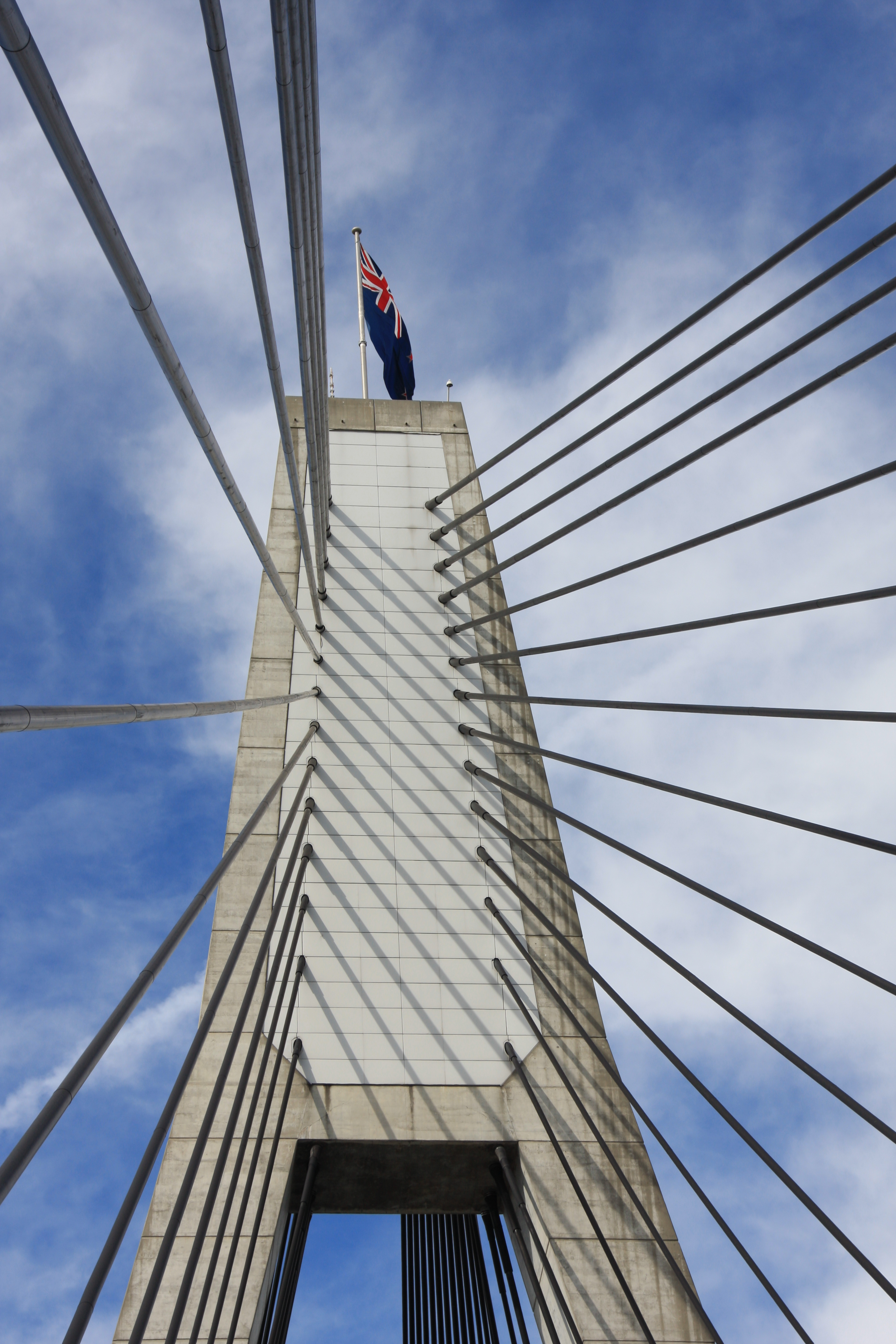
Stay cables attachment at the top of the pylon.

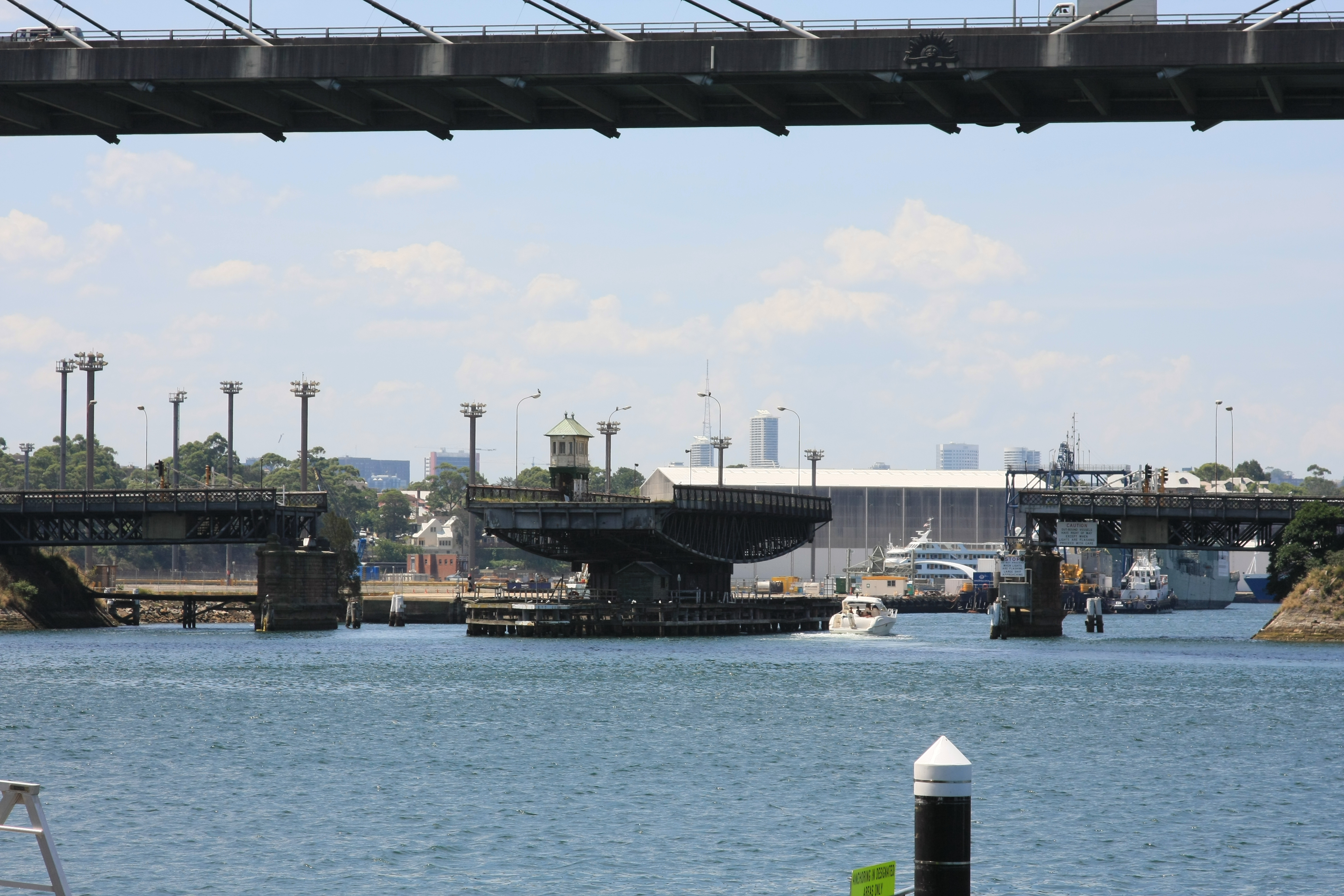
The disused (second) Glebe Island Bridge viewed from water level, with the deck of Anzac Bridge visible above.

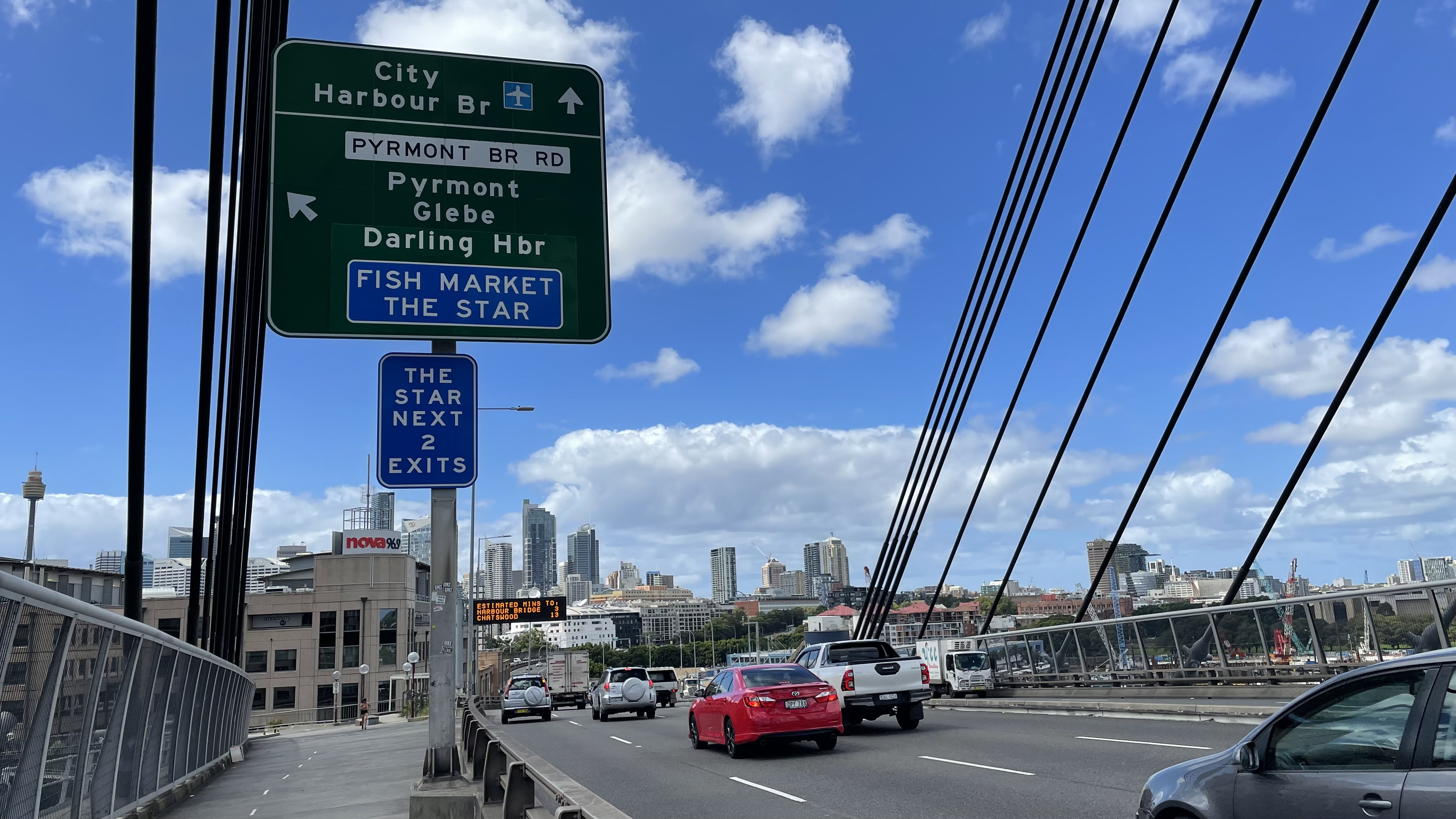
The eastern end, with CBD view in background

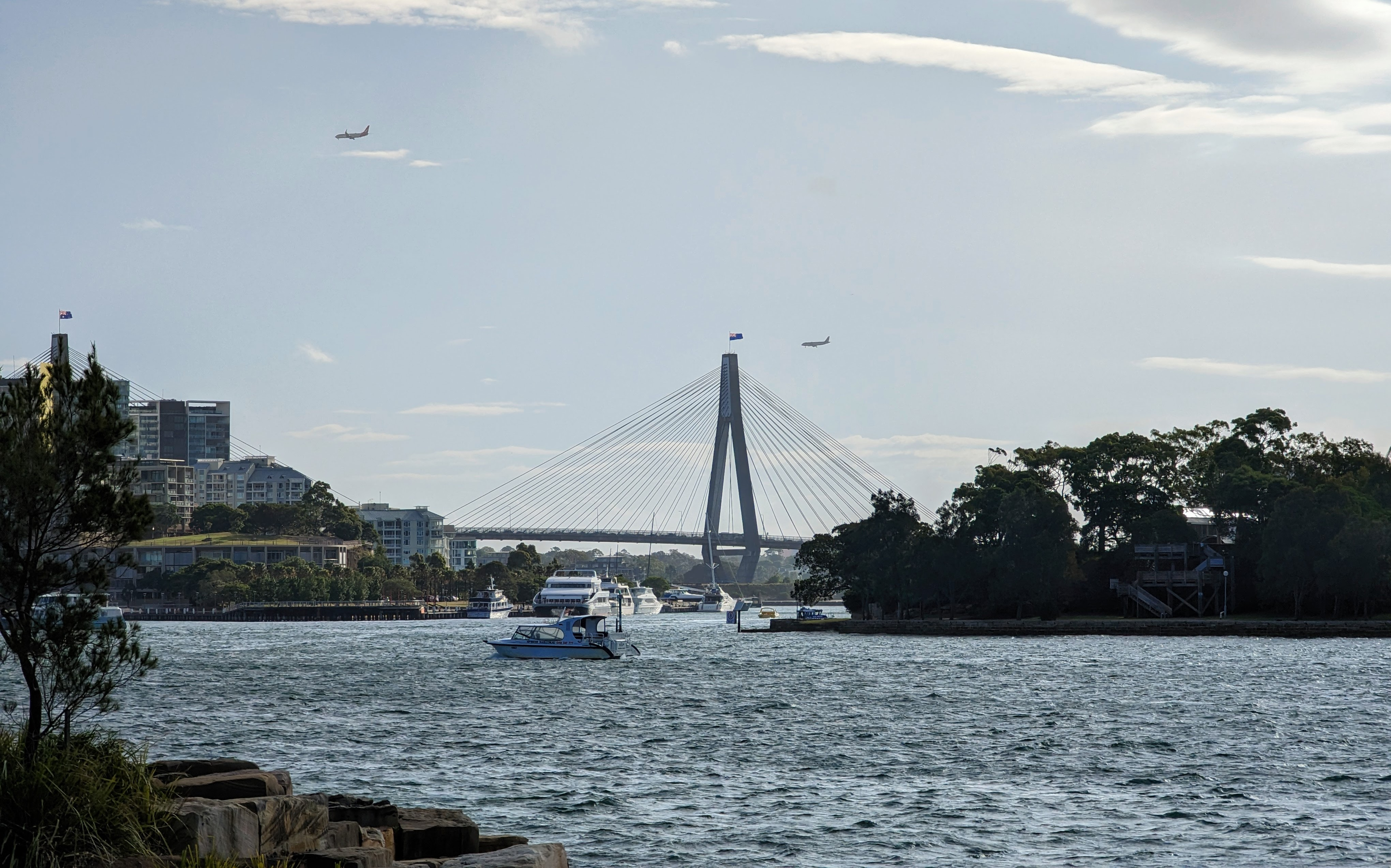
View from Barangaroo Reserve

== See also ==
- List of bridges in Sydney
- List of longest cable stayed bridges
