= BLS =

BLS may refer to:

== Organizations ==
- Basketball League of Serbia (Serbian: Кошаркашка лига Србије, romanized: Košarkaška liga Srbije, lit. 'KLS')
- Bears Lagoon Serpentine Football Club, Victoria, Australia; an Australian-rules football team
- Buckeye Leadership Society, an honorary leadership Society at The Ohio State University, US
- Bureau of Labor Statistics, a US government agency

=== Companies ===
- BellSouth (ticker symbol), a defunct US telephone company
- BLS AG (formerly Bern-Lötschberg-Simplon railway), a railway company in Switzerland

=== Education ===
- Boon Lay Secondary School, a government secondary school in Jurong West, Singapore
- Boston Latin School, Boston, Massachusetts, US
- Brooklyn Law School, New York City, New York State, US
- Bucerius Law School, Hamburg, Germany

== Science and technology ==
- Body lengths per second (BL/s), a unit of animal speed; see Fastest animals
- Brillouin light scattering, in physics
- Cadillac BLS, a compact executive car
- BL S-series engine, an internal combustion engine by the Austin Rover Group
- BLS digital signature (Boneh–Lynn–Shacham signature), a cryptographic signature scheme

=== Biology and medicine ===
- Bacterial leaf scorch, a disease state affecting many crops
- Bare lymphocyte syndrome, a form of severe combined immunodeficiency
- Basic life support, an emergency medical protocol
- Blind loop syndrome, small intestinal bacterial overgrowth

== Other uses ==
- Bachelor of Liberal Studies, a tertiary education degree
- Bachelor of Library Science, a tertiary education degree
- Balaesang language (ISO 639 language code bls), found on Sulawesi
- Black Label Society, an American heavy metal band
- Brighton-le-Sands (B-l-S), a suburb in New South Wales, Australia; see History of Brighton-Le-Sands, New South Wales

== See also ==
- WBLS, station BLS in region W; a New York radio station
- KBLS, station BLS in region K; a Kansas radio station
- CBLS, station BLS in region C; a Canadian radio station
- BLSS (disambiguation)
- BL (disambiguation)
- Brighton le Sands (disambiguation)
