= BLSS =

BLSS may refer to:

- Bioregenerative life support system, an artificial ecosystem consisting of many complex symbiotic relationships
- Bioartificial Liver Support, a type of liver support system
- Faculty of Business, Law and Social Sciences, Birmingham City University, Birmingham, England, UK
- Bureau of Learner Support Services, Department of Education (Philippines)

== See also ==
- BLS (disambiguation) for the singular of BLSs
- Bless (disambiguation)
- Bliss (disambiguation)
- Bloss
- Blass
