= Thomas Saywell =

English-born business person in New South Wales, Australia

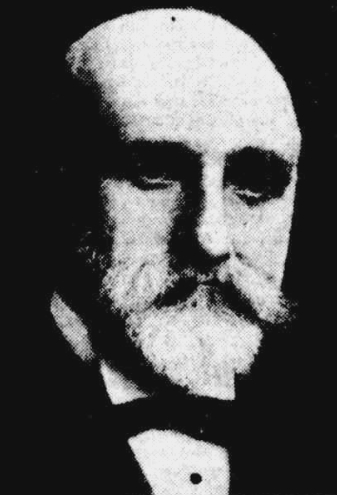
Thomas Saywell

Thomas Saywell (1837–1928) was an English-born tobacco manufacturer, property developer, mine owner, and business person in New South Wales, Australia. He is particularly associated with the Sydney suburb of Brighton-le-Sands and the coal mines of Lithgow and the Southern Coalfields. He holds the dubious distinction of manufacturing the first Australian-made cigarettes.

== Early life ==
=== Family background and early life ===
The Saywell family name was originally Seyuille, at the time when their Huguenot ancestors fled to England in 1604. The family had been lacemakers in France and Flanders. Eventually settling in Nottingham, they pursued lace-making there.

Thomas Richard Saywell was born on 20 February 1837, in Radford, Nottingham. His mother died while he was an infant and his father remarried.

Thomas Saywell's father, George, was an expert in setting up steam-driven mechanical lace-making machines. After the lace trade in Nottingham fell into decline, George, his brother and their families moved to France, in 1841. By 1842, they had settled in the village of Saint-Pierre-lès-Calais, now referred to as the Quartier Saint-Pierre of Calais. Thomas was sent to a local Catholic school there, and as a result was fluently bilingual in French and English.

=== Emigration to New South Wales ===
Economic conditions in France and the revolution of 1848, left the Saywell family and other English workers in France in a precarious position. With scant prospects at home in England, the workers petitioned the English government to assist them to migrate to a British colony. The Saywell family arrived in Sydney aboard Agincourt on 6 October 1848.

=== First years in New South Wales ===
Initially unable to take their savings out of France, the Saywell family faced poverty. George Saywell became a carrier, with two bullock teams and some horses and carted coal, but within a year or so had a small piece of land and a share in a coal mine. For a time, George ran a hotel at Maitland. Thomas was working there as a tobacco twister in 1852. He spent some time on the goldfields, not as a miner but assisting his uncle to run a paid lending library.

Thomas Saywell married Annie Ellen Fawcett (1839–1905), daughter of a Balmain stonemason, in 1862. He opened a tobacconist's shop in Park Street, Sydney, in 1863.

== Entrepreneur ==
Thomas Saywell expanded his tobacco business and became an entrepreneur. He did so by mutually-beneficial partnerships and astute investments. He also became a major landholder and land developer.

=== Tobacco manufacturing ===
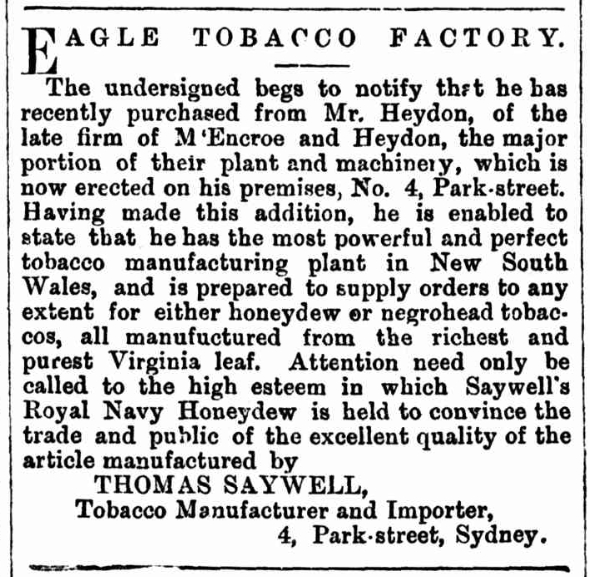
Advertisement 1871

Thomas Saywell tobacconist's operation grew, in 1870, when he bought plant and machinery of the Eagle Tobacco Factory and installed it in his shop at 4 Park Street. Thereafter he used the brand name 'Eagle'. In 1874, he bought another tobacconists business from Edwin Penfold, whose son, William Clark Penfold, later became a well-known Sydney printer and stationer. In February 1873, Saywell bought land on Clarence Street, Sydney, and over the next two years built a tobacco factory there. Saywell has the dubious distinction of being the manufacturer of the first Australian-made cigarettes. He was an advocate of protection of the local tobacco industry.

In 1882, a publicly listed company Saywell's Tobacco Company Limited was floated to purchase the assets of Saywell & Company. Although the new company initially used his name, the name of the company was changed to The Eagle Tobacco Company Limited, in August 1891; around that time Saywell sold his remaining shares in the business. He needed the funds for investment in his collieries.

=== R. L. Scrutton & Co. ===
In 1883, Thomas Saywell, in partnership with an engineer, Robert Le Neve Scrutton (1843–1937), set up R. L. Scrutton and Company, at 35 Pitt Street, Sydney. The company were manufacturers and importers of ironwork for buildings and bridges, steam engines, wire rope, pipes, pumps, mining equipment, and machine tools. The company also fitted steamships with refrigeration equipment. They also were agents for large overseas engineering companies, including Brooklyn Engineering Company and Dorman Long & Co. Many years later trusses for the Harbour Bridge would be assembled at the company's yard at Alexandria.

Saywell would use R. L. Scrutton & Co. to import three steam locomotives from Hudswell Clarke; 'Saywell' made in 1886 and 'Pigmy' made in 1887, both for his tramway, and another locomotive, made in 1888, for the South Bulli Colliery. He also imported a locomotive, 'Fowler', made by John Fowler in 1885, initially for his tramway but later used at his mine. The South Bulli locomotive of 1888, which was in use until 1962, survives in non-operational condition.

=== Coal mining ===
Saywell became a major investor in the coal industry in NSW. He was able to do this because he did so in partnership with people, who had greater knowledge and experience in the industry, notably William Wilson (c.1840—1896), who took charge of the mining and construction activities.

==== Vale of Clwydd Colliery ====
The opening of the Main Western railway line over the Blue Mountains in 1867, created potential to exploit the Western Coalfields around Lithgow. Saywell opened an adit in 1868, around Hartley Vale, but abandoned this in 1869. In partnership John Newlands Wark, Saywell opened a new mine that became the Vale of Clwydd Colliery. A joint stock company called the Vale of Clwydd and Lithgow Valley Coal Mining and Copper Smelting Company was set up in November 1872, and an act of NSW Parliament, the Vale of Clwydd Company's Incorporation Act of 1881, later confirmed the incorporation of the company and the ownership of its property.

By 1880, Saywell had erected copper smelters adjacent to the mine. He leased these to Lewis Lloyd, a Welsh-born copper mining and smelting entrepreneur. Otherwise unsaleable fine coal, known as 'slack' coal, was well-suited as a fuel for reverberatory furnaces.

==== Bundanoon ====
Saywell held a short-lived interest in the Ringwood Coal Mine, near Bundanoon, beginning in September 1883. The mine development would involve constructing 14 miles of tramway from the mine site to the Main Southern railway line. The mine closed and was abandoned, after a timber trestle structure collapsed. In 1885, Saywell moved equipment from the mine to his later mining venture, South Bulli Colliery.

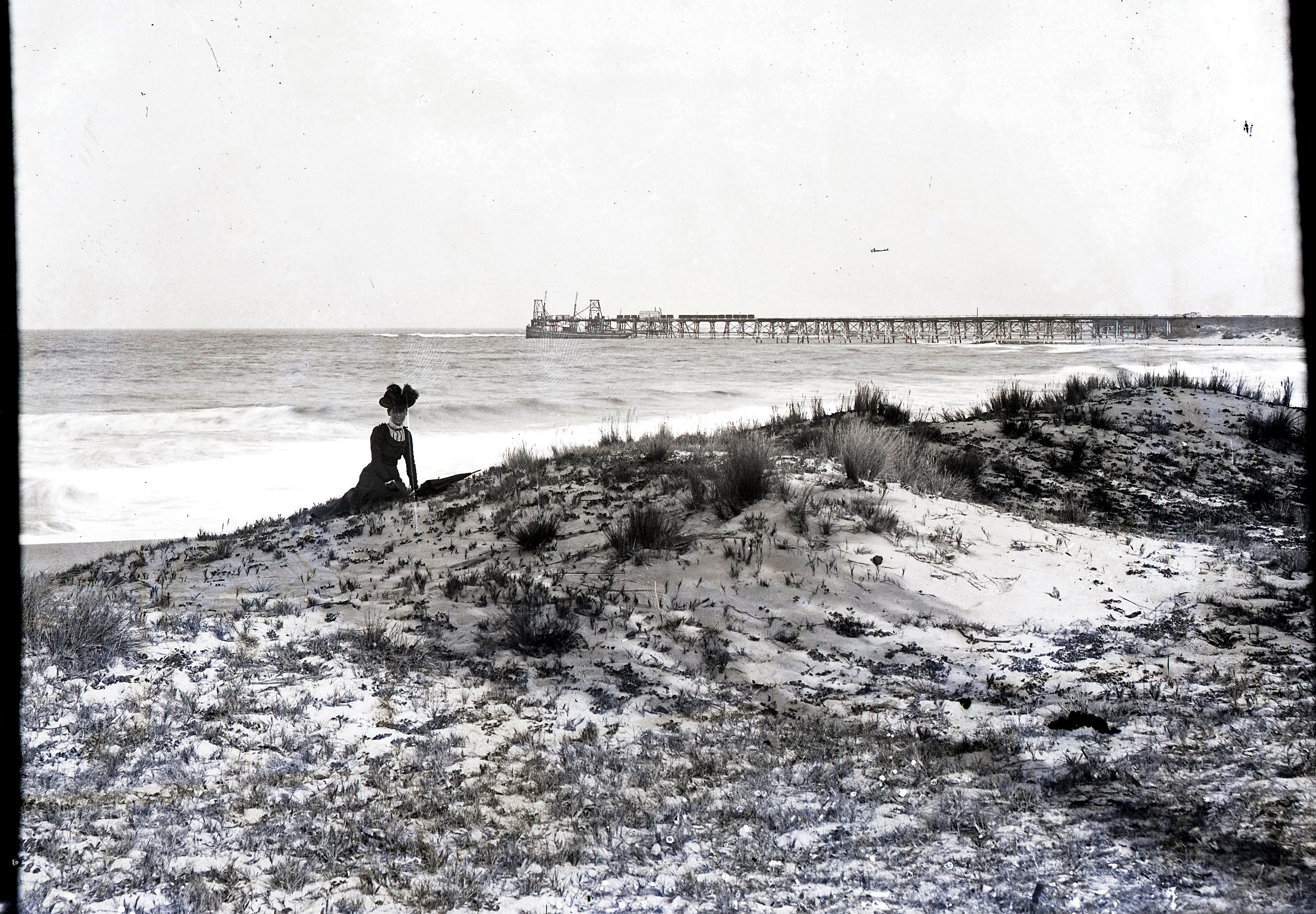
Woman, with the two jetties at Bellambi in the background (c.1890). South Bulli jetty is the longer, slightly more distant jetty. A sixty-miler is loading coal at that jetty.

==== South Bulli Colliery and Bellambi ====
Bellambi became a coal port, when a coal jetty was built there in 1858, for the Woonoona Colliery, but this did not last.

In 1885, Saywell and his partner William Wilson leased land with an abandoned colliery, at Russell Vale, from the Osborne family, renaming it the South Bulli Colliery. They built the South Bulli jetty, at Bellambi, in 1887. The jetty stood on Bellambi Beach, immediately to the north of Bellambi Point and its opening reestablished Bellambi as a coal port. It was linked to the South Bulli Colliery by a private railway. William Wilson is credited with the construction of the South Bulli jetty at Bellambi.

In August 1890, Ebenezer Vickery purchased the South Bulli Colliery and its jetty. Although Saywell was only involved with South Bulli for around five years, the operation that he and his partner established was long-lived. The jetty closed in 1952, but the mine was working until quite recent years.

==== South Clifton ====
In 1891, Saywell and his business partner William Wilson bought the South Clifton colliery from the North Illawarra Coal Company. In 1902, Saywell transferred his share of the ownership to a company Saywell's Collieries Limited, which also held interests in collieries around Lithgow. Like South Bulli, South Clifton was a long-lived mine.

==== Other coal interests ====
Saywell was a director of the Wickham and Bullock Island Coal Company, around 1896.

=== Lady Robinson's Beach and Brighton-le-Sands ===
==== Saywell's land purchase ====
In the early 1880s, Saywell, anticipating the effect of the Illawarra railway, bought a large tract of land—in those days mainly sandhills—which ran from the beach frontage at Lady Robinson's Beach on Botany Bay, west to what is now Francis Avenue and as far north what is now as Bestic Street.

Initially, Saywell referred to the locality as 'New Brighton'. To avoid confusion with another 'New Brighton' near Manly, the area was renamed Brighton-le-Sands, after Brighton-le-Sands, Merseyside, in England.

In early 1886, the NSW Government resumed the entire length of Lady Robinson's Beach and a narrow strip of the foreshore land, totalling around 105 acres, running from Cooks River to Sans Souci. It became known as Cook Park.

In 1887, the Saywell family moved from Petersham to 'Nevada', 8 The Grand Parade, on Lady Robinson's Beach, in what would later become known as the suburb of Brighton-le-Sands.

==== Tramway ====
The first of Saywell's developments in the area was his privately owned tramway. It ran from Rockdale railway station to Lady Robinson's Beach at Brighton-le-Sands, along Bay Street, before originally turning left on the Grand Parade, where it terminated, allowing access to a new sea baths and hotel. It opened as a steam-hauled tramway in November 1885. It also allowed convenient access for new residents of the area and for visitors.

==== Sea Baths ====
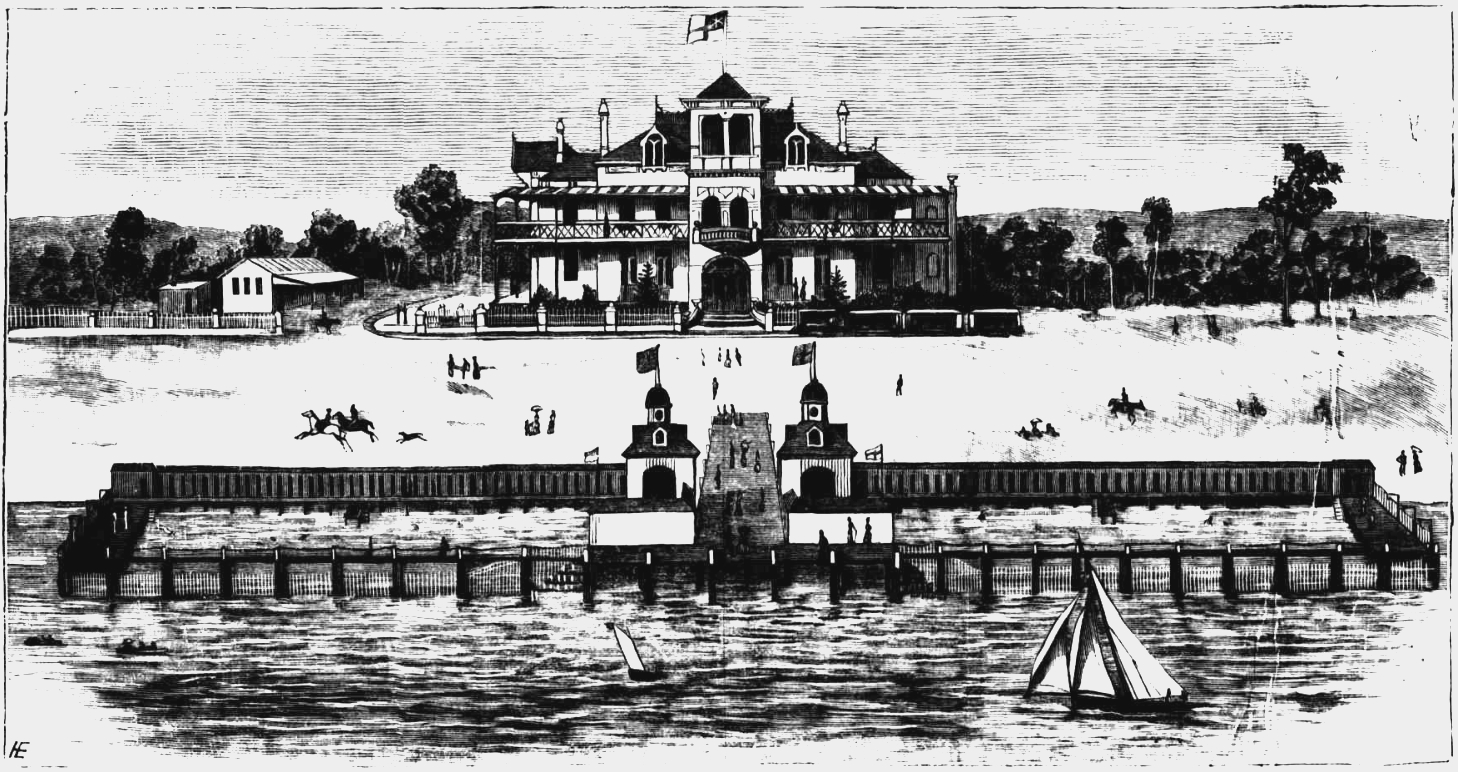
Saywell's Sea Baths, with the hotel at rear (December 1886)

To draw patrons to the area, Saywell constructed sea baths, with a shark-proof enclosure. The design had consist of two adjoining baths, one for men and the other for women, each 200 feet long by 90 feet wide. There was wharf for steamers, refreshment rooms, waiting-rooms, ticket-office, laundries, and caretakers' offices would be housed in buildings forming an entrance to the baths. The baths were surrounded by a shark-proof fence, and would contain dressing-boxes and fresh-water showers. It was estimated that the baths would cost about £8000, to construct.

"Saywell's New Sea Baths" opened in October 1886. The baths were damaged during storms in mid 1901, and Saywell leased them for the last time in 1921, but over time the baths fell into disrepair. The "Old Baths" were still shown on a map in 1934, but already had been replaced by new baths further south on the beach belonging to the Municipality of Rockdale, in 1928.

==== New Brighton Hotel ====
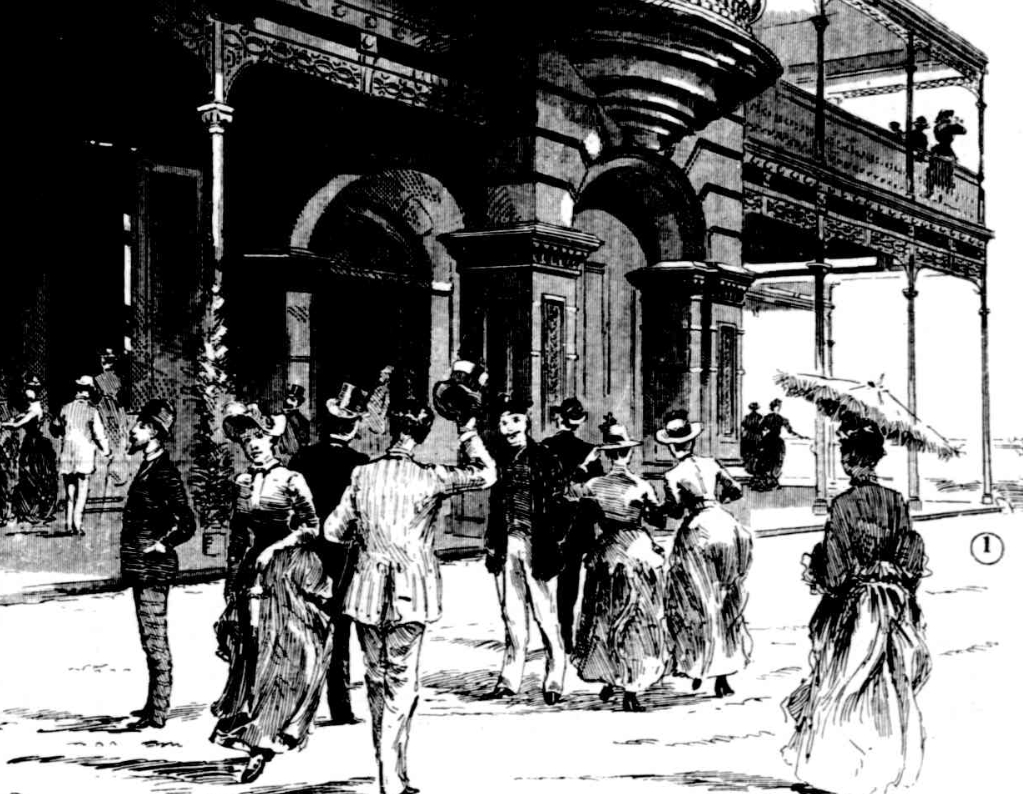
Main entrance to the hotel (1887)

Saywell had the New Brighton Hotel erected in 1887, at the corner of The Grand Parade and Bay Street. It immediately became a popular seaside resort.

The three storey building had an entrance portico, wide verandahs and balconies, and sixty rooms. The main tower gave extensive views over Botany Bay. The hotel had an ice rink, running hot water, and electric lighting, and later a dance pavilion was built at the rear of the hotel. The hotel's architecture followed an eclectic mixture of Russian, Indian and Western influences, including towers and minarets.

It was Saywell, in collaboration with Samuel Cook, who had Norfolk Island pine trees planted, as a windbreak and to stabilize drifting sand opposite the New Brighton Hotel. Some of the trees still stand on The Grand Parade. Most of the original trees were destroyed by gales or road widening, but the tradition of planting new trees continued, and the species now lines much of the beachfront.

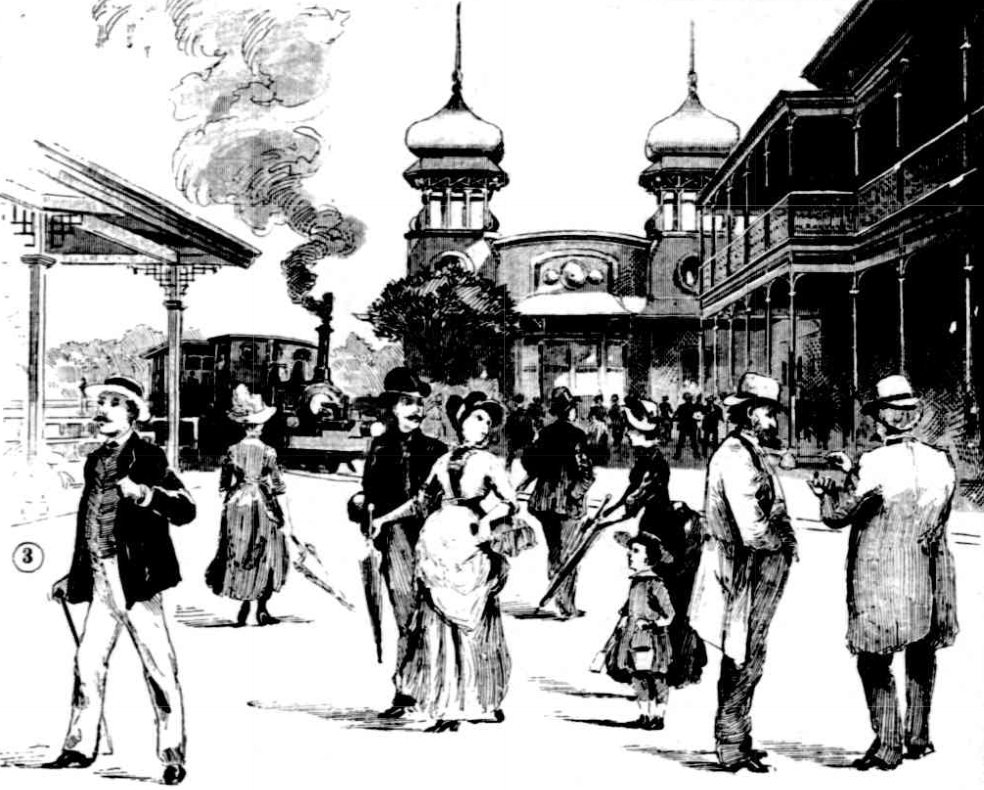
Side view of the New Brighton Hotel, with the Assembly Hall (a huge dance pavilion) at rear, and the steam tramway (1887)

From January 1893 until 1895, when the adjoining racecourse opened, the hotel building became the first home of Scots College, before once again becoming a hotel.

==== 'Shady Nook' ====
On the southern side of Bay Street and west of The Grand Parade, opposite to his hotel, Saywell made a picnic grounds known as 'Shady Nook'. It had a merry-go-round, a robust shelter shed, and a building containing a tearoom, shop, and post office. Otherwise, in marked contrast to the nearby hotel, the facilities were basic and built for vandal resistance rather than comfort, including a heavy see-saw made from tramway sleepers, which had to be used carefully to avoid injury. Old tramcar bodies were provided as additional picnic shelters.

Although there was pressure to retain the land as open space, as late as 1928, the area was redeveloped and subsequently built over.

==== Electric trams and electricity supply ====
The first electricity supply in the St George area, was that for Saywell's tramway. It was converted from steam to electric power, in 1900. An Act of the NSW Parliament, would have permitted Saywell to provide electric street lighting, for which he would have been paid, but it was never passed by Parliament.

Electric tram and trailer car, outside New Brighton Hotel (c.1906)

Saywell constructed a coal-fuelled powerhouse, in what had been stables at the rear of the New Brighton Hotel. It used a three-wire (−240V — 0V / Ground — +240V) direct current system, giving 480V d.c. for the trams—Saywell's trams had two trolley poles, one for positive and the other for negative—and 240V d.c. for other uses. The powerhouse included a large bank of batteries. As well as powering the trams and lighting his hotel, Saywell's powerhouse did supply some other customers with 'electric current'. These consumers included, by around 1911, some street lighting in the Municipality of Rockdale and some shop premises in Rockdale.

There was a lengthy disruption to services, when there was an equipment failure at the powerhouse. After hiring a steam tram motor and trailer car from NSW Government Tramways during the disruption, Saywell bought the steam tram motor 100A from them, in 1905, as a contingency.

At the expiry of Saywell's 30-year tramway operating concession in 1914, the Government Railways took over the tramway, retiring Saywell's aging electric trams. The government trams worked on a different current collection arrangement (one trolley pole and rail return). The tramway supply and overhead was reconfigured, and, initially, Saywell's power station continued to provide power for the government tram. In December 1917, a new tramway substation entered service, at Rockdale, supplied by a high-voltage a.c. power line from Newtown, and ultimately powered from White Bay Power Station. The tramway continued to operate under government ownership, until September 1949, when it was replaced by a bus service.

Saywell's powerhouse continued to generate electrical power until October 1923, continuing to supply power to Rockdale's electric street lighting and to other consumers. The tramway still was used to move coal wagons from the railway, at Rockdale, to the power station. However, Saywell's d.c. system was far too small, too unreliable, and too antiquated to serve the growing St George area. Once alternating current electricity became available from the newly established St George County Council, Saywell's power station closed.

==== Brighton Racecourse ====
Saywell built a racecourse close to the hotel. It opened in 1895. The racecourse was created by levelling sand hills over the area for the course. One of Sydney's smaller racecourses, it hosted pony races and trotting events. It surrounded by a twelve-feet high paling fence. It was bounded by Bay Street in the south and what are now known as Francis Avenue, Moate Avenue, and back to Gordon Street, now known as Henson Street.

The racecourse closed in 1911, and the land was subsequently developed for detached residential housing.

==== Real estate development ====
Saywell sold off parts of his extensive landholding at Brighton-le-Sands for residential development. The first land sale seems to have been the 'Fairlight Estate', New Brighton, in 1886. Other land developments were; Brighton-Le-Sands 'Sunset Estate' (1912) Beach Frontages, The Esplanade, Brighton-Le-Sands (1912), Brighton Beach Estate (1922) and Shady Nook Estate (1922).

=== Other real estate developments ===
Although Saywell is now best remembered in connection with Brighton-le-Sands, the land there was but one of a number of land developments that he carried out.

In the suburbs of Sydney, his land developments included one at Macquarie Fields, the old Albert Cricket Ground at Redfern, the Beaconsfield Estate at Alexandria, and Queen's Estate at St Leonards.

Saywell was a director of the Haymarket Permanent Land, Building, and Investment Company Limited, a land company, in 1886. It sold land in the suburbs of Rockdale, Petersham, Kingsgrove, Sandringham, San Souci and Manly.

Saywell put land adjoining the South Clifton Colliery up for sale in 1891, then known as South Clifton, it is now Scarborough.

=== Brickmaking ===
Saywell had, at various times, interests in brickworks in the Sydney area, at Marrickville, Petersham, and Chatswood. He also sold land adjoining his brickworks for residential development.

== Later life and death ==
Thomas Saywell continued to live at Brighton-le-Sands for many years, at 'Nevada', a 8 Grand Parade. He moved to Mosman, for the last few years of his life, living in a house named 'Nottingham' in Middle Head Road, where he died on 23 November 1928, aged 92. His remains lie in Waverley Cemetery.

== Family ==
Saywell and his first wife, Annie Ellen, née Fawcett, had six daughters and seven sons; George Fawcett Saywell (1863–1934), Ada Saywell (1866–1954), Frederick Wallace Quinton Saywell (1868–1894) Rose Annie Saywell (1870–1946), Ross Saywell (1872–1942), Leah Jane Saywell (1874–1948), Frank Horace Saywell (1876–1958), Thomas Stanley Saywell (1878–1950), Victor Claud (better known as Claude Victor) Saywell (1879–1932), Annie Ellen Saywell (1881–1967), Bruce Wilson Saywell (1883–1925), Zilla Mina Saywell (1886–1973), and Vera Brighton Saywell (1888–1968).

Saywell's wife Annie died in 1905. He married Rebecca Elizabeth Osbourne (1857–1948), in 1906. She was part of the extended family of Henry Osborne (1803–1859). The Osborne's were original owners of the land around South Bulli Colliery and other large holdings in the Illawarra, and were among the early mine owners of the Southern Coalfields.

Frederick Saywell died as a young man. Of Thomas Saywell's other sons, although they were all men of independent means, most also did work for a living; George Saywell was managing director of R.L. Scrutton Ltd, Ross Saywell was the general manager of the South Clifton Colliery, Claude Saywell and Thomas Stanley Saywell were partners in a firm of solicitors known as Saywell & Saywell, and Frank Saywell was a dentist. Only his youngest son, Bruce, seems not to have worked in some capacity, being described only as being 'of independent means'.

Saywell's large family were all extremely wealthy, at the time of the Great Depression in Australia. While the unemployment rate reached as high as 32% in Australia, during the 1930s, some members of the large family were the subject of newspaper reports, with the subject matter including, their wealth, overseas travel, marital issues, drunkenness, and family tragedies.

=== Family fortune ===
Saywell's estate was valued at £164,190. His widow received £1,000 a year and other annuities, including two of £100 each and one of £200. His private estate, which was mentioned in 1923 as being worth £89,000, was divided between his four surviving sons, George Fawcett Saywell, Thomas Stanley Saywell, Ross Saywell, and Victor Claude Saywell.

His shareholdings in Saywell's Tramway and Estates Ltd., South Clifton Coal Mining Co. Ltd, Saywell's Collieries Ltd., City Finance Co., and R. L. Scrutton, and Co. Ltd., were distributed by being transferred to registered shareholders of Saywell's Tramway and Estates Ltd., who were all family members. The sole exception was one of his sons, Bruce Wilson Saywell, The exclusion of the son was explained by Saywell's having already fully provided for him during his lifetime. By the time of Saywell's death, Bruce had already died, and Bruce's estate was valued at £121,000, when his heirs came of age to inherit it, in 1931.

In 1947, it was reported that the Saywell family owned 174 of the 705 houses, in 12 streets of the then lower-socioeconomic suburb of Redfern. The Communist newspaper, Tribune, accused the family of being slumlords, citing the sub-standard nature of their houses.

=== Bruce Saywell ===
Saywell's son Bruce Wilson Saywell was fortunate to escape conviction on a charge of manslaughter. A car he was driving struck and killed a young widow who worked as a domestic servant, in 1913. Although the incident was witnessed by a police constable and Bruce had been drinking, a coroner returned a verdict of accidental death. In 1911, he had been fined for dangerous driving, after his car collided with a sulky.

Bruce died in England in 1925. He had a clause in his will, which had the effect of disinheriting any of his children who married a Catholic, and that clause was upheld in court. Even for the times, when there was widespread sectarianism in Australia, such a level of overt sectarian hostility was newsworthy. Bruce's son, also Bruce, married bakery and catering heiress Betty Sargent, youngest daughter of the late Hartley Sergent in 1937, in an Anglican church.

=== Murder of Claude Saywell ===
During the early hours of the morning of 22 April 1932, Saywell's son, Claude Victor, a wealthy solicitor, and his wife, Adeline Rebecca, were brutally attacked at their home in Bellevue Hill. The attack, made using a claw hammer, later found on adjacent land, took place while they were sleeping in their bedroom. There was a loughboy, reportedly containing a considerable amount of jewelry and also some "rolls of notes". The loughboy had been disturbed and clothing stewn around the bedroom, but it apparently is unclear if any items were taken. Two others in the house, their younger son Thomas and the family's maid, stated that they had slept through the events, although Thomas claimed to have been briefly awakened by a noise at around 1 a.m.. The couple were found severely injured and barely alive, by their maid, on the following morning. Claude Victor died of his injuries in hospital on the following day, without regaining consciousness. Mrs Saywell later regained consciousness in hospital, but she had lost the ability to speak and was left permanently paralysed. She could never identify her assailant nor give any evidence to the inquest. Some suspicion was aroused by the behaviour of Claude Victor's son, Jack, who had returned to the house very late. However, after Jack was interviewed and gave statements to the police, he seems to have been eliminated as a suspect. It emerged that he had been visiting his girlfriend. The friendship was a source of friction between Jack Saywell, and his parents, because the girl was a Catholic. However, probably, when Jack had returned home around 2 a.m., the attack already had occurred. Sixteen year old Thomas Saywell, seems never to have been considered a suspect, and there seems to be no evidence that he was involved. The previous day Mrs Saywell had slammed the front door in the face of a hawker, and there was also some speculation that the attack may have been related to Claude Victor's work as a solicitor. The coronial inquiry, which attracted widespread public interest, resulted in a finding of murder by an unknown person.

In a strange coincidence, it had been Thomas Stanley Saywell, Claude's brother and partner in the firm of solicitors Saywell & Saywell, who had found the mortally wounded bank manager, Frank Cecil Kemmis, in July 1922, aboard a North Shore line train. Kemmis had also been attacked using a claw hammer, which was found discarded on land near Wahroonga railway station. Thomas reportedly knew Kemmis, and reportedly became worried after Kemmis's murder. At the time of his brother Claude's murder, Thomas was living in America, although that was reportedly due to complicated marital and child custody matters.

The Saywell estate offered a reward £1,000 to the first person to give information leading to a conviction. Police were said to be confident of making an arrest, but it appears no charges were ever laid. It remained an unsolved case, and is still a mystery without a satisfactory explanation.

Claude Victor's two sons inherited an income of £3,000 per annum, upon attaining 21 years of age.

=== Suicide of Frank Saywell's wife ===
On the morning of 12 May 1933, Mrs Frank Saywell drove away from her luxurious home in Wollstonecraft. Leaving her car for servicing, she bought a return train ticket to Hornsby and then went to Galston Gorge. She clambered down the side of the gorge. Her well-dressed appearance led a man, who was living in the nearby 'Hopeville' camp for unemployed people, to take notice of her. He later found her convulsing and groaning in pain, with an empty poison bottle—later found to have been disinfectant—and two drinking cups nearby in dense bushland. Unconscious by the time she received medical attention, despite having her stomach contents pumped, she died soon thereafter.

As a Sydney socialite of the time, she was mostly known by her husband's name, and most newspaper articles about her social activities, her husband's philanthropy, and her death, do not make mention her own name. It was Elsie May (née Sweeny). It emerged that, at the time of her death, she had lived apart from her husband for some time. Her husband stated that they had been apart, for four years, and that his wife "to a certain extent was partially mentally deranged, as she would get very depressed". He said that she had been worried over income tax and the state of her daughter's health. The coroner's finding was "death from suicide while of unsound mind".

Frank Saywell, described as a wealthy North Sydney dentist, remarried later in 1933. His second marriage ended in divorce, in 1940, on grounds of his adultery. During the divorce proceedings, it was alleged that Frank Saywell had claimed to be in the top five highest income tax payers in New South Wales, and had £250,000 in assets and an income of £10,000 per year. For many years, he was commemorated by the Frank H. Saywell Free Kindergarten at Moore Park, the building of which he had funded, in 1917. It was later demolished to construct the Eastern Distributor.

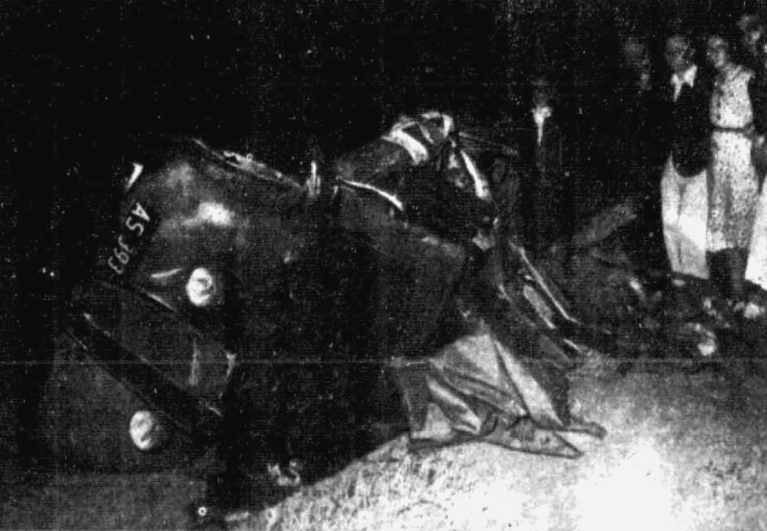
The accident scene in Darley Road, Randwick, lit by the photographer's flash gun.

=== Death of namesake grandson Thomas Richard Saywell ===
Claude's younger son, Thomas Richard, was just 21, when he died after a road accident that occurred on 23 December 1937. He was "driving wildly", after a day on which he had consumed a "considerable amount of liquor", when he lost control at a bend in the road. His car left a skid mark of 80 feet, struck a pole with a glancing blow, turned over several times, and finally came to a rest when it collided with another pole. He received horrendous injuries, of which he died on the next day. His only passenger survived the crash, but spent 17 days in hospital. Despite accepting evidence of alcohol consumption and excessive speed, the finding of a coroner's inquest was accidental death. Thomas Richard Saywell was intestate, and his estate of around £100,000 was divided between his brother Jack and his invalid mother.

== Legacy ==
The coal mines once owned by Thomas Saywell have all closed. The last to close was the South Bulli Colliery.

Some of the area of Redfern, where his estate once reportedly owned 174 slum dwellings was subject to a slum clearance—initiated by NSW Housing Minister Clive Evatt—and extensively redeveloped by the government as public housing and open space. Alderson Street, Redfern, a street on which Saywell's family once owned 29 houses, no longer exists, now being parkland and a Police Citizens' Youth Club.

Saywell Street in Chatswood is named after him. The street, before 1891 called Station Street, was once near the site of one of his brick pits, and later was part of his 1885 'Willoughby Heights' subdivision.

The main legacies of Thomas Saywell are the various tracts of land which he sub-divided and sold in the suburbs of Sydney, at St Leonards, Chatswood, Redfern, Alexandria and, most of all, Brighton-le-Sands.

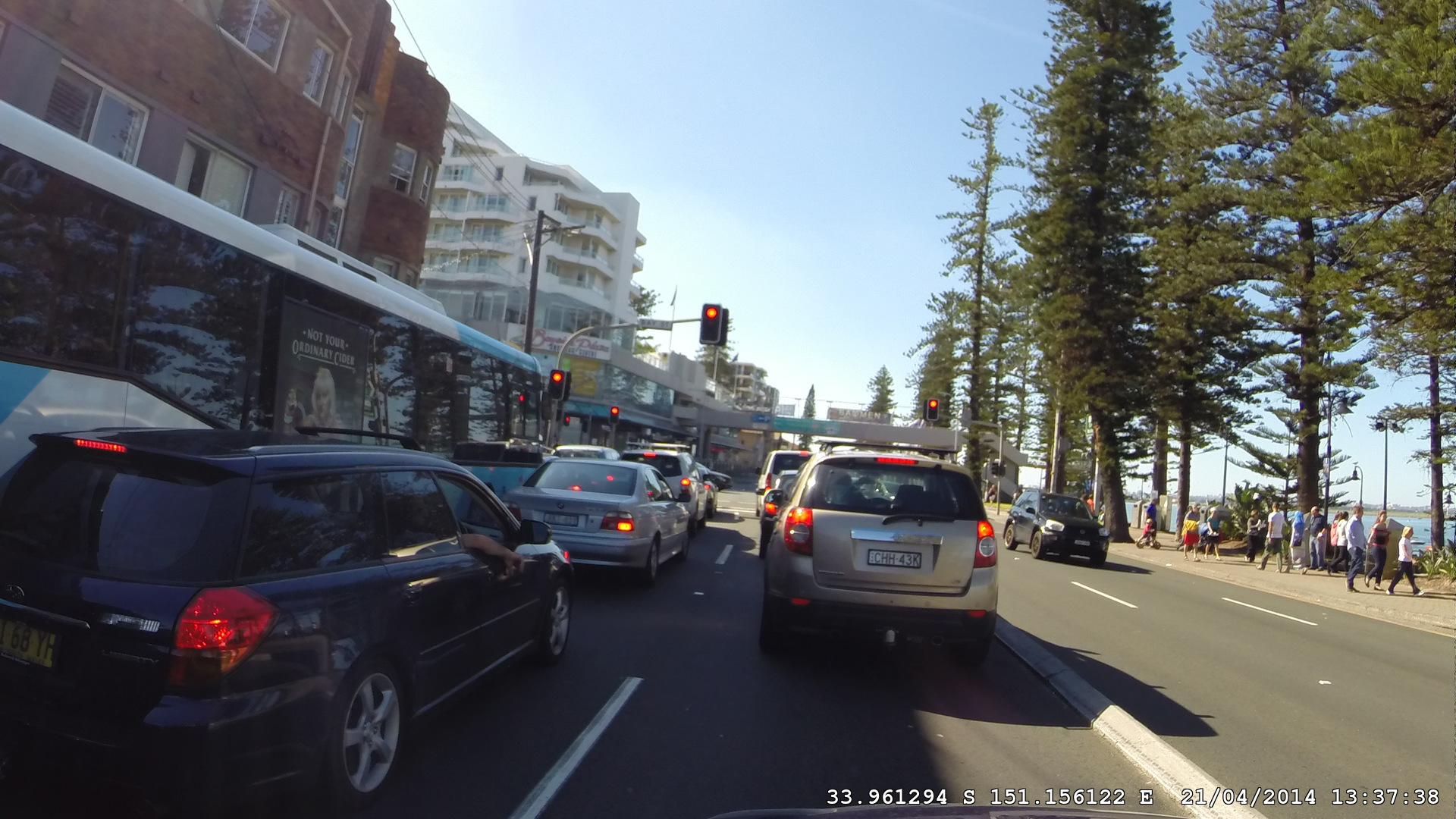
The Grand Parade, Novotel Hotel and Norfolk Island pines.

The tramway that Saywell had originally built closed, and replaced by a bus service, in 1949. Its closure was the first major step in the post-war closure of the tramways of Sydney. Residents formed a committee to advocate restoration of the tram service, but the infrastructure had been rendered unusable within days of Its closure. Its former route is now part of the 478 and 479 bus routes. The steam tram motor that Saywell bought, in 1905, survives at MOTAT in Auckland, New Zealand.

The site of Saywell's New Brighton Hotel is now occupied by a more recent hotel, the Brighton Novotel. His houses 'Nevada', at 8 The Grand Parade, and 'Osborne House', at 12 The Grand Parade, were long ago demolished and replaced with other houses. A few of the tall Norfolk Island pine trees, which he had planted still stand on The Grand Parade, Brighton-le-Sands.

== See also ==
- History of Brighton-le-Sands, New South Wales
