= City of Hurstville =

Former local government area in New South Wales, Australia

Hurstville City Council
- Local government area
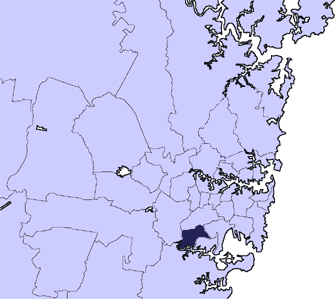
- Location in Metropolitan Sydney, 1931–2016

- Coordinates: 33°58′S 151°06′E
- Country: Australia
- State: New South Wales
- Region: St George
- Established: 25 March 1887
- Abolished: 12 May 2016
- Council seat: Civic Centre, Hurstville

Area
  - Total: 23 km^{2} (8.9 sq mi)

Population
  - Total: 80,823 (2011 census)
  - Density: 3,510/km^{2} (9,100/sq mi)
- Parish: St. George
- Website: Hurstville City Council
LGAs around Hurstville City Council
Bankstown	Canterbury	Bexley/Rockdale
Bankstown	Hurstville City Council	Rockdale
Sutherland	Sutherland	Kogarah

The City of Hurstville was a local government area in the St George and southern region of Sydney, New South Wales, Australia. The city seat of Hurstville was located 17 kilometres (11 mi) south–west of Sydney and west of Botany Bay. Hurstville was incorporated as a municipality in 1887, declared a city in 1988 and, in 2016, was amalgamated with Kogarah City Council to form Georges River Council.

== Council history ==
On 25 March 1887 the NSW Government Gazette published a proclamation declaring the "Municipal District of Hurstville". On 29 December 1887, the Municipality was divided into three wards: Bexley Ward, Hurstville Ward and Peakhurst Ward. On 28 June 1900, a further proclamation declared the separation of Bexley Ward as the Borough of Bexley.

A proclamation on the same day reconstituted Hurstville, divided into two wards: Hurstville and Peakhurst. On 10 September 1908, Hurstville was divided into four wards: Hurstville Ward, Woodville Ward, Peakhurst Ward and Penshurst Ward. On 2 August 1922, a part of Hurstville was transferred to the Sutherland Shire; on 5 December 1924 part of Canterbury Municipality was transferred to Hurstville; and on 1 January 1931 part of Hurstville was transferred to Kogarah Municipality. On 3 July 1968 Woodville Ward was abolished, with the council divided into three wards: Hurstville, Peakhurst and Penshurst.

In December 1920, Hurstville, Rockdale, Kogarah, and Bexley councils formed St George County Council to provide electricity to their areas. On 1 January 1980, they amalgamated it with Sydney County Council on 1 January 1980. On 25 November 1988, the Municipality of Hurstville was proclaimed as the "City of Hurstville".

In 2023, former councillors Vince Badalati, Con Hindi and Philip Sansom were found guilty of corruption in office by the ICAC.

=== Council seats ===
In 1889 Hurstville Council purchased a property on the corner of Forest Road, Hurstville, for £1750, as the first Council Chambers until 1913. However, its small size meant that within a few decades, Council sought options for a new purpose-built Council Chambers further up on a site fronting McMahon Street on the corner with Dora Street occupied by the fire station. By November 1913 the old fire station was remodelled into new Council Chambers by architect (and former Mayor of Kogarah) Charles Herbert Halstead.

On 31 July 1930 Council approved a proposal for new chambers on the site of the 1913 chambers. The foundation stone, placed next to the re-laid foundation stone from the demolished 1913 chambers, was laid by Mayor Hill on 6 December 1930. The new Chambers, designed in the Inter-War Georgian Revival style by architects Herbert & Wilson (Leonard Federick Herbert and Edward Douglas Wilson), was officially opened on 16 May 1931 by the Minister for Local Government, William McKell.

A new 'Civic Centre' concept with the provision of a performance hall, for a site on McMahon Street north of Dora Street was first proposed Mayor Olds on 17 July 1947, and was the subject of continuing debate throughout the 1950s. The project was finally approved by Council in June 1954. Designed in the Post-War International Style by architects Peddle Thorp & Walker and built by James S. Samson & Co. of Parramatta, the new Civic Centre included an auditorium which seated 1264 people (named Marana Hall in 1964, meaning 'place of stars') and a smaller hall (named Amaroo Hall in 1964, meaning 'lovely place'). Completed at a cost of £320,000, the Civic Centre was officially opened on 2 June 1962 by the Governor of New South Wales, Sir Eric Woodward.

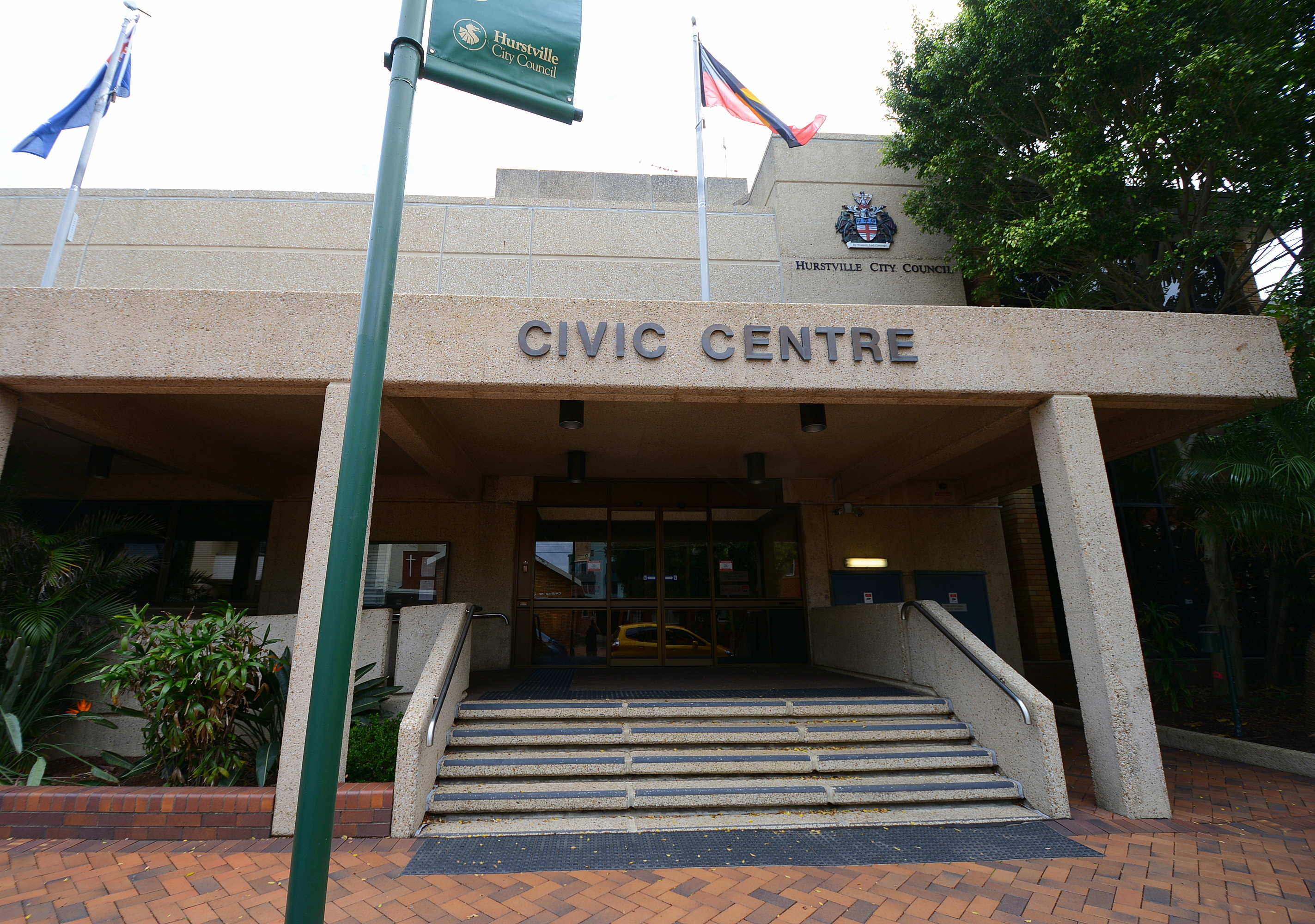
The 1982 extension of the Hurstville Civic Centre on MacMahon Street, Hurstville, is now the seat of Georges River Council.

After the completion of the Civic Centre in 1962, the former Council Chambers further down on McMahon Street was tenanted by the Bank of New South Wales from 1963 to 1965 and the St George Police-Citizens Boys' Club from 1966 to 1969, before being demolished in January 1974 for the 'Hurstville House' office/retail development. The foundation stones from the old Council Chambers were incorporated into façade of 1962 Civic Centre.

In January 1977, Hurstville Council acquired the former 'Rivoli Hall' on the other corner of Dora Street and McMahon Street, which was soon demolished to make way for a Brutalist style extension to the Civic Centre that would incorporate a new central library designed by the Council Architect. The extension and library, completed at a cost of approximately $4.3 million, was officially opened on 30 July 1982 by the Premier of New South Wales, Neville Wran.

=== Amalgamation proposals ===
Efforts to bring about a unified council for the St George area were raised regularly since 1901 and the 1946 Clancy Royal Commission into local government boundaries recommended the amalgamation of the municipalities of Hurstville, Kogarah, Rockdale and Bexley. In the following act of parliament passed in December 1948, the Local Government (Areas) Act 1948, the recommendations of the commission were modified, leading only to the merger of Bexley and Rockdale councils. A merger was again considered in the 1970s, but 1977 plebiscites run in Hurstville and Kogarah rejected the idea. A further idea of amalgamating Kogarah and Hurstville with Sutherland Shire to the south was raised in 1999 but did not progress.

A 2015 review of local government boundaries by the NSW Government Independent Pricing and Regulatory Tribunal recommended that Hurstville merge with the City of Kogarah to form a new council with an area of 38 square kilometres (15 sq mi) and support a population of approximately 147,000. On 12 May 2016 the NSW Government announced that Hurstville and Kogarah would merge to form the Georges River Council, with immediate effect.

== Suburbs and localities in the former local government area ==
Suburbs in the Hurstville City Council area were:

- Beverly Hills (part within Canterbury)
- Hurstville
- Kingsgrove (parts within Canterbury & Rockdale)
- Lugarno
- Mortdale
- Narwee (shared with Canterbury)
- Oatley (part within Kogarah)
- Peakhurst
- Peakhurst Heights
- Penshurst
- Riverwood (shared with Canterbury)

The following unofficial localities were also located within Hurstville:

- Boggywell Creek
- Edith Bay
- Gertrude Point
- Gungah Bay
- Hurstville Bay
- Jew Fish Bay
- Jew Fish Point
- Kingsway
- Lime Kiln Bay
- Lime Kiln Head
- Oatley West
- Soilybottom Point

== Demographics ==
At the 2011 Census, there were 78,855 people in the Hurstville local government area, of these 48.5% were male and 51.5% were female. Aboriginal and Torres Strait Islander people made up 0.6% of the population. The median age of people in the City was 37 years. Children aged 0 – 14 years made up 17.7% of the population and people aged 65 years and over made up 15.4% of the population. Of people in the area aged 15 years and over, 53.4% were married and 9.2% were either divorced or separated.

Population growth in Hurstville City Council between the 2001 Census and the 2006 Census was 5.31%; and in the subsequent five years to the 2011 Census, population growth was 6.96%. When compared with total population growth of Australia for the same periods, being 5.78% and 8.32% respectively, population growth in Hurstville local government area was marginally lower than the national average. The median weekly income for residents within the City was generally on par with the national average.

Selected historical census data for Hurstville local government area
Census year		2001	2006	2011
Population	Estimated residents on Census night	70,009	73,725	78,855
Population	LGA rank in terms of size within New South Wales			
Population	% of New South Wales population			1.14%
Population	% of Australian population	0.37%	0.37%	0.37%
Cultural and language diversity				
Ancestry, top responses	Chinese			21.2%
Ancestry, top responses	Australian			15.9%
Ancestry, top responses	English			15.4%
Ancestry, top responses	Irish			5.2%
Ancestry, top responses	Greek			5.1%
Language, top responses (other than English)	Cantonese	9.3%	▲10.8%	▲11.2%
Language, top responses (other than English)	Mandarin	4.4%	▲8.0%	▲11.1%
Language, top responses (other than English)	Greek	5.0%	▼4.9%	▼4.8%
Language, top responses (other than English)	Arabic	4.0%	4.0%	▲4.1%
Language, top responses (other than English)	Macedonian	2.6%	2.6%	2.6%
Religious affiliation				
Religious affiliation, top responses	Catholic	27.0%	▼25.5%	▼24.2%
Religious affiliation, top responses	No religion	13.2%	▲17.0%	▲21.3%
Religious affiliation, top responses	Anglican	18.0%	▼15.2%	▼12.5%
Religious affiliation, top responses	Eastern Orthodox	9.4%	▲9.9%	9.9%
Religious affiliation, top responses	Buddhism	n/c	▲4.5%	▲5.6%
Median weekly incomes				
Personal income	Median weekly personal income		A$664	A$540
Personal income	% of Australian median income		142.5%	93.6%
Family income	Median weekly family income		A$1,510	A$1,475
Family income	% of Australian median income		147.0%	99.6%
Household income	Median weekly household income		A$1,773	A$1,284
Household income	% of Australian median income		151.4%	104.0%

== Council ==
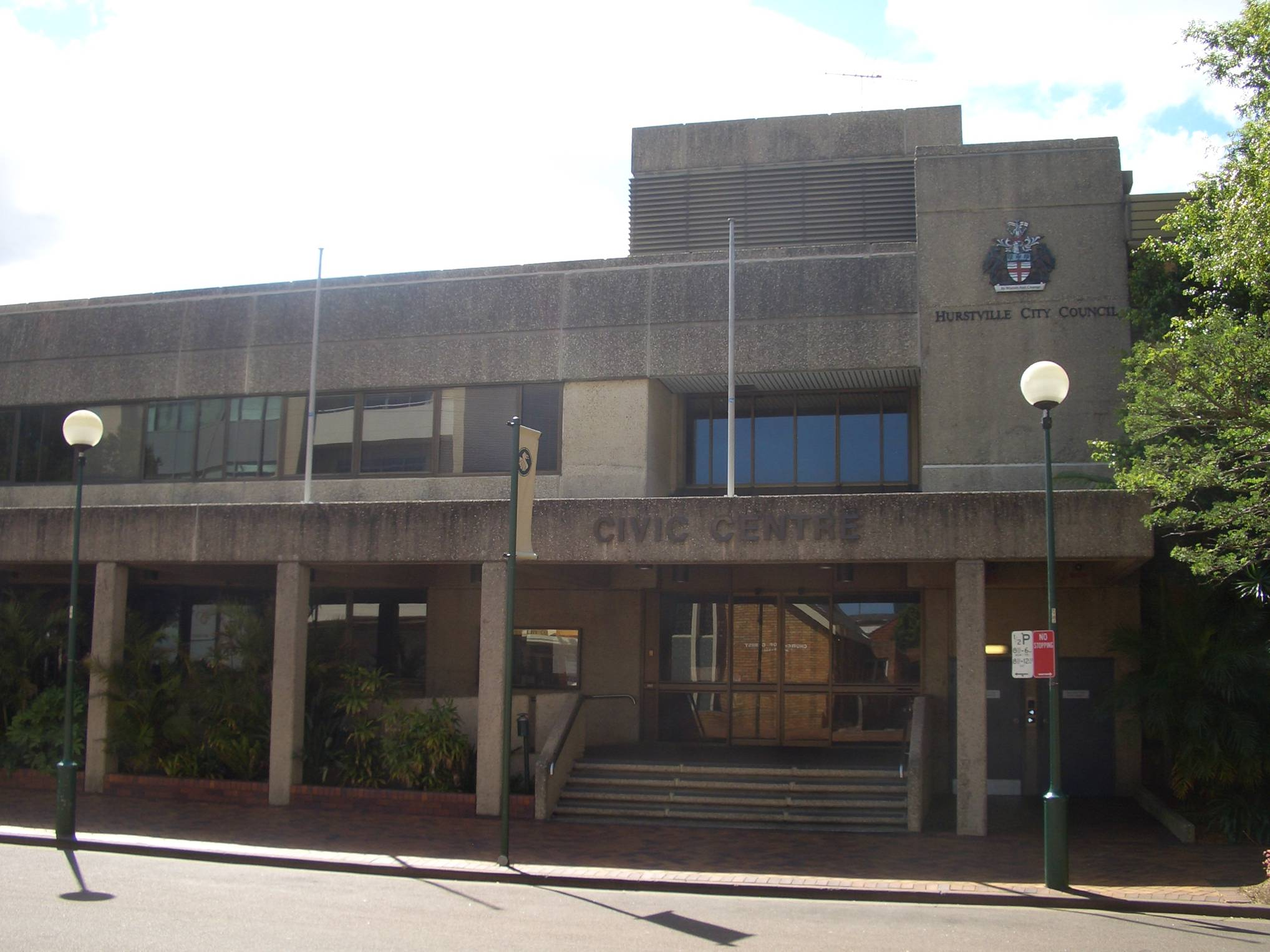
Hurstville Civic Centre on McMahon Street, Hurstville, was the seat of the council from 1962 (1982 extension shown) until 2016.

=== Final composition and election method ===
Hurstville City Council was composed of twelve Councillors elected proportionally as three separate wards, each ward electing four Councillors. All Councillors were elected for a fixed four-year term of office. The Mayor and Deputy Mayor were elected annually by the Councillors at the first meeting of the Council in September. The last election was held on 8 September 2012, and the final makeup of the Council in the term 2012–2016, in order of election by ward, was as follows:

Ward	Councillor	Party	Notes
Hurstville	Vince Badalati	Labor	Mayor 2015–2016. Elected Georges River Hurstville Ward, 2017.
Hurstville	Nancy Liu	Unity	Deputy Mayor 2013–2014. Elected Georges River Hurstville Ward, 2017.
Hurstville	Colin Drane	Labor	Elected 2012–2016
Hurstville	Brent Thomas	Labor	Elected 15 March 2014 by-election by vacancy of Andrew Istephan.
Hurstville	Andrew Istephan	Liberal	Deputy Mayor 2012–2013. Resigned 2 December 2013.
Peakhurst	Jack Jacovou	Liberal	Mayor 2012–2014. Resigned July 2015 (no by-election).
Peakhurst	Michelle Stevens	Independent	Deputy Mayor 2014–2015
Peakhurst	Rita Kastanias	Liberal	Elected 2012–2016. Elected Georges River Peakhurst Ward, 2017.
Peakhurst	Philip Sansom	Independent	Deputy Mayor 2005–2006, 2008–2009.
Penshurst	Justin Mining	Labor	Elected 2012–2016.
Penshurst	Con Hindi	Liberal	Deputy Mayor 2009–2012. Elected Georges River Mortdale Ward, 2017.
Penshurst	Dominic Sin	Labor	Deputy Mayor 2015–2016
Penshurst	Christina Wu	Liberal	Elected 2012–2016. Elected Georges River Hurstville Ward, 2017.

== Mayors ==
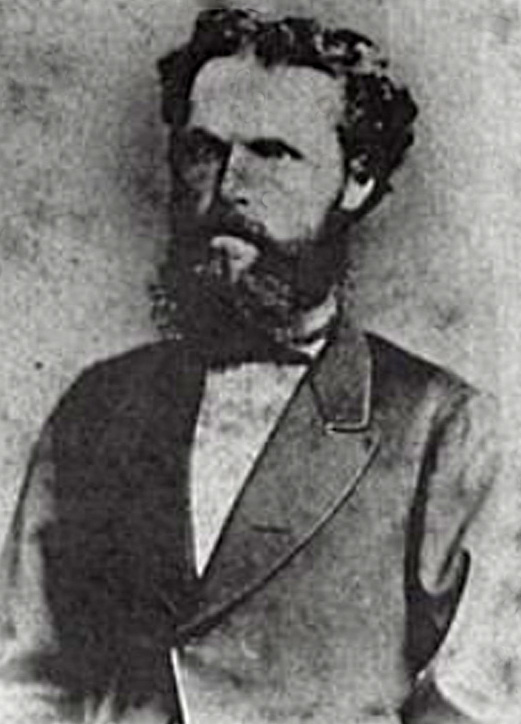
John Sproule (1838–1905), was three times Mayor (1890–1891, 1897–1898) and was the first Mayor of Canterbury from 1879 to 1880.

Mayor	Party	Term	Notes
Alexander Milsop	Independent	23 June 1887 – 12 February 1889	
Hugh Patrick	Independent	12 February 1889 – 13 February 1890	
John Sproule	Independent	13 February 1890 – 28 May 1891	
Charles Bull	Independent	28 May 1891 – 9 February 1893	
John George Griffin	Independent	9 February 1893 – 13 February 1895	
Charles Bull	Independent	13 February 1895 – 15 August 1895	
Hugh Patrick	Independent	19 August 1895 – 12 February 1896	
John Thompson	Independent	12 February 1896 – 10 February 1897	
John Sproule	Independent	10 February 1897 – 8 February 1898	
John George Griffin	Independent	8 February 1898 – 14 February 1899	
Frederick Gamaliel Thompson	Independent	14 February 1899 – 24 October 1900	
John Thompson	Independent	24 October 1900 – 12 February 1902	
Edward Frank Fripp	Independent	12 February 1902 – 29 May 1902	
Hugh Patrick	Independent	29 May 1902 – 15 September 1902	
Henry Parkes Poulton	Independent	15 September 1902 – 14 February 1905	
Charles Bede Hunt	Independent	14 February 1905 – 13 February 1908	
Samuel Aston	Independent	13 February 1908 – 4 February 1909	
Walter Matthew Musgrove	Independent	4 February 1909 – 9 February 1910	
John Thompson	Independent	9 February 1910 – 14 February 1911	
Samuel Aston	Independent	14 February 1911 – 28 February 1911	
Alfred Leslie Blackshaw	Independent	1 March 1911 – 27 September 1911	
Peter Anderson Young Low	Independent	27 September 1911 – 7 February 1913	
Hugh Patrick	Independent	7 February 1913 – 28 February 1914	
Edward Henry Baker	Independent	1 March 1914 – 28 February 1915	
Alexander Grant	Independent	1 March 1915 – 29 February 1916	
Ernest Alfred Bradford	Independent	1 March 1916 – 4 July 1917	
Edward Henry Baker	Independent	4 July 1917 – 28 February 1919	
Ernest Albert Field	Independent	1 March 1919 – 14 August 1919	
James Spencer O'Neill	Independent	22 August 1919 – 5 February 1920	
Thomas Valyer Cross	Independent	5 February 1920 – 9 December 1920	
William Thomas Macken	Independent	9 December 1920 – 7 December 1921	
Edward Henry Baker	Independent	7 December 1921 – 2 December 1922	
William Thomas Macken	Independent	7 December 1922 – 6 December 1923	
Alfred Edward Humphrey	Independent	6 December 1923 – 4 December 1924	
Wallace Collier	Independent	4 December 1924 – 9 December 1925	
Sydney Hall Binder	Independent	9 December 1925 – 16 December 1926	
James Eli Webb	Independent	16 December 1926 – 12 December 1927	
Ernest Albert Field	Independent	12 December 1927 – 6 December 1928	
Henry Hill	Independent	6 December 1928 – 11 December 1930	
Robert Alexander Patrick	Independent	11 December 1930 – 8 December 1932	
Walter Ernest Smith	Independent	8 December 1932 – 18 December 1933	
Robert Alexander Patrick	Independent	18 December 1933 – 6 December 1934	
Walter Ernest Smith	Independent	6 December 1934 – 16 December 1936	
Peter Anderson Young Low	Independent	16 December 1936 – 8 December 1937	
George Thomas Cross	Independent	8 December 1937 – 13 December 1938	
Hedley Richard Horace Mallard	Independent	13 December 1938 – 13 December 1939	
Walter Ernest Smith	Independent	13 December 1939 – 6 December 1945	
Oliver Arnold Olds	Independent	6 December 1945 – 9 December 1948	
Norman Percy Lord Macpherson	Independent	9 December 1948 – 6 December 1950	
Hedley Richard Horace Mallard	Independent	6 December 1950 – 20 December 1955	
Michael Croot	Independent	20 December 1955 – 15 December 1959	
Hedley Richard Horace Mallard	Independent	15 December 1959 – 5 December 1960	
Harry Clifford Marsden	Independent	5 December 1960 – 14 December 1961	
Gordon William 'Snowy' Hill	Independent	14 December 1961 – 12 December 1963	
Allan Alexander Lawrance	Independent	12 December 1963 – 14 December 1965	
Horace James Cable	Independent	6 December 1965 – 6 December 1966	
Ernest Joseph Curlisa	Labor	6 December 1966 – 28 September 1971	
James Robert Walsh		28 September 1971 – 7 March 1974	
Ernest Joseph Curlisa	Labor	7 March 1974 – 20 September 1974	
Michael Croot	Independent	1 October 1974 – 18 September 1975	
Kevin Ryan	Labor	18 September 1975 – 16 September 1976	
Noel Vincent Bergin		16 September 1976 – 26 September 1977	
Maxwell William Benn		26 September 1977 – 11 September 1978	
Gary Punch	Labor	11 September 1978 – 12 April 1983	
Albert Francis O'Connor	Labor	13 April 1983 – 18 September 1984	
Joan Loew	Independent	18 September 1984 – 26 September 1987	
Bill Pickering	Independent	6 October 1987 – 13 September 1988	
Bryan McDonald	Labor	13 September 1988 – 20 September 1989	
Robert Bruce Sharp		20 September 1989 – 17 September 1990	
Marie Ficarra	Independent	17 September 1990 – 23 September 1991	
Mervyn Lynch	Labor	23 September 1991 – 23 September 1992	
Bill Pickering	Independent	23 September 1992 – 21 September 1994	
Bryan McDonald	Labor	21 September 1994 – 25 September 1995	
Peter Olah	Labor	25 September 1995 – 16 September 1998	
Michael Frawley	Independent	16 September 1998 – 27 September 1999	
Philip Sansom	Independent	27 September 1999 – 6 September 2000	
Bill Pickering	Independent	6 September 2000 – 17 September 2001	
Vince Badalati	Labor	17 September 2001 – 14 April 2004	
Joanne Morris	Labor	14 April 2004 – 14 September 2005	
Vince Badalati	Labor	14 September 2005 – 10 September 2009	
Philip Sansom	Independent	10 September 2009 – 13 September 2011	
Steve McMahon	Labor	13 September 2011 – 27 September 2012	
Jack Jacovou	Liberal	27 September 2012 – 11 September 2014	
Con Hindi	Liberal	11 September 2014 – 9 September 2015	
Vince Badalati	Labor	9 September 2015 – 12 May 2016	

== Coat of arms ==
Hurstville City Council adopted the current coat of arms as part of the Council’s centenary celebrations in 1987 and was designed by H. Ellis Tomlinson of the College of Arms.

Coat of arms of City of Hurstville
Adopted 1987 Motto BY WISDOM AND COURAGE Symbolism Shield: The shield comprises Saint George's Cross, the blue representing the water of the Georges River, and three gum trees which symbolise the Council’s three wards (Hurstville Ward, Peakhurst Ward, and Penshurst Ward). Crest: The crest features Saint George within a red walled crown. St George is included as the patron saint of Hurstville’s first church, guarding the region with a sword, and the civic crown references the early brick-making industry in the area. Supporters: Two St George dragons, with feet resting on tree stumps, represent the early forestry industry of the Hurstville district. Motto: The motto was first used in an earlier crest that celebrated Hurstville Council’s 75th anniversary.
