= City of Kogarah =

Former local government area in New South Wales, Australia

- Local government area
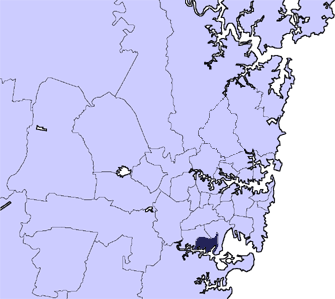
- Location in Metropolitan Sydney, 1887–2016

- Coordinates: 33°58′S 151°08′E
- Country: Australia
- State: New South Wales
- Region: St George
- Established: 22 December 1885
- Abolished: 12 May 2016
- Council seat: Civic Centre, Kogarah

Area^{a}
  - Total: 19.51 km^{2} (7.53 sq mi)

Population
  - Total: 55,806 (2011)
  - Density: 2,860.4/km^{2} (7,408/sq mi)
- Parish: St. George
- Website: City of Kogarah
LGAs around City of Kogarah
Hurstville		Bexley/Rockdale
Hurstville	City of Kogarah	Rockdale
Hurstville	Sutherland	Rockdale

The City of Kogarah was a local government area in the St George region of southern Sydney, in the state of New South Wales, Australia. The centre of the city is located 14 kilometres (8.7 mi) south-west of the Sydney central business district and west of Botany Bay.

The Municipality of Kogarah was established on 22 December 1885 and in 2008 Kogarah became the first local government area in New South Wales to become a city by popular vote. The city was bounded by the Illawarra railway line, Georges River, Rocky Point Road, Princes Highway and Harrow Road. The name Kogarah is Aboriginal, meaning place of reeds and takes its name from the reeds that grew in the inlets along the Georges River and at the head of Kogarah Bay. On 12 May 2016, the NSW Government announced that Kogarah and Hurstville councils would merge to form Georges River Council with immediate effect.

== Council history ==
The "Municipal District of Kogarah" was proclaimed on 23 December 1885, and the district's boundaries commenced at the intersection of the Illawarra Railway Line with the northern shore of Georges River. The Municipal District was renamed the "Municipality of Kogarah" following the passage of the Municipalities Act, 1897 on 6 December 1897. On 22 December 1916 and 1 January 1969, parts of Municipality of Rockdale were transferred to Kogarah. Kogarah was proclaimed a city in 2008.

In December 1920, Kogarah combined with the councils of Rockdale, Hurstville, and Bexley to form the St George County Council. The elected County Council was established to provide electricity to the Kogarah, Rockdale, Hurstville, and Bexley areas, and ceased to exist when it was amalgamated with the Sydney County Council on 1 January 1980.

=== Council Chambers ===
In 1910 the council acquired land in Belgrave Street, Kogarah, for £285. The foundation stone of the Council Chambers was laid 27 March 1912 by the Mayor W. J. Jones and was designed by Alderman Charles Herbert Halstead. The completed Council Chambers was officially opened on 7 September 1912 by the Governor, Lord Chelmsford.

The 1912 Council Chambers had had many alterations, including a first floor addition completed to a design by architects Moore & Dyer in 1937 which had required the council to hold its meetings at the St George County Council headquarters in Montgomery Street while construction occurred. The newly remodelled chambers were officially reopened by the Minister for Local Government, Eric Spooner, on 28 April 1937. In 1970 it was decided to replace the old council chambers, which were demolished to make way for the Kogarah Civic Centre, opened by Governor Sir Roden Cutler in 1973.

=== Amalgamation ===
Efforts to bring about a unified council for the St George area were raised regularly since 1901 and the 1946 Clancy Royal Commission into local government boundaries recommended the amalgamation of the municipalities of Hurstville, Kogarah, Rockdale and Bexley. In the following act of parliament passed in December 1948, the Local Government (Areas) Act 1948, the recommendations of the commission were modified, leading only to the merger of Bexley and Rockdale councils. A merger was again considered in the 1970s, but 1977 plebiscites run in Hurstville and Kogarah rejected the idea. A further idea of amalgamating Kogarah and Hurstville with Sutherland Shire to the south was raised in 1999 but did not progress. Kogarah opposed an attempt by the NSW Government to amalgamate with Hurstville and Rockdale in 2003.

A 2015 review of local government boundaries by the NSW Government Independent Pricing and Regulatory Tribunal recommended that Kogarah merge with the City of Hurstville to form a new council with an area of 38 square kilometres (15 sq mi) and support a population of approximately 147,000. On 12 May 2016, the NSW Government announced that Kogarah and Hurstville would merge to form Georges River Council with immediate effect.

== Suburbs and localities in the former local government area ==
Suburbs in the City of Kogarah were:

- Allawah (shared with Rockdale)
- Beverley Park
- Blakehurst
- Carlton (shared with Rockdale)
- Carss Park
- Connells Point
- Hurstville (shared with Hurstville)
- Hurstville Grove
- Kogarah (shared with Rockdale)
- Kogarah Bay
- Kyle Bay
- Mortdale
- Oatley
- Penshurst (shared with Hurstville)
- Sans Souci
- South Hurstville

Kogarah City Council also managed and maintained the following localities:

- Bald Face
- Carss Point
- Connells Bay
- Harness Cask Point
- Neverfail Bay
- Oatley Bay
- Shipwright Bay
- Tom Uglys Point

== Demographics ==
At the 2011 Census, there were 55,806 people in the Kogarah local government area, of these 48.8% were male and 51.2% were female. Aboriginal and Torres Strait Islander people made up 0.4% of the population. The median age of people in the Kogarah City Council was 37 years. Children aged 0 – 14 years made up 17.6% of the population and people aged 65 years and over made up 14.1% of the population. Of people in the area aged 15 years and over, 54.5% were married and 8.8% were either divorced or separated.

Population growth in the City between the 2001 Census and the 2006 Census was 5.32%; and in the subsequent five years to the 2011 Census, population growth was 6.22%. When compared with total population growth of Australia for the same periods, being 5.78% and 8.32% respectively, population growth in Kogarah local government area was marginally lower than the national average. The median weekly income for residents within the city was generally on par with the national average.

Selected historical census data for Kogarah local government area
Census year		2001	2006	2011
Population	Estimated residents on Census night	49,885	52,537	55,806
Population	LGA rank in terms of size within New South Wales			
Population	% of New South Wales population			0.81%
Population	% of Australian population	0.27%	▼0.26%	0.26%
Cultural and language diversity				
Ancestry, top responses	Chinese			18.7%
Ancestry, top responses	Australian			14.4%
Ancestry, top responses	English			14.1%
Ancestry, top responses	Greek			8.7%
Ancestry, top responses	Irish			5.1%
Language, top responses (other than English)	Mandarin	4.0%	▲8.1%	▲10.5%
Language, top responses (other than English)	Cantonese	7.0%	▲7.9%	▲8.7%
Language, top responses (other than English)	Greek	8.0%	▲8.1%	8.1%
Language, top responses (other than English)	Arabic	3.6%	▲3.8%	▼3.6%
Language, top responses (other than English)	Macedonian	n/c	▲2.2%	▲2.3%
Religious affiliation				
Religious affiliation, top responses	Catholic	27.8%	▼26.2%	▼24.6%
Religious affiliation, top responses	No religion	12.1%	▲16.2%	▲20.0%
Religious affiliation, top responses	Eastern Orthodox	13.3%	▲14.5%	▲14.8%
Religious affiliation, top responses	Anglican	17.4%	▼14.0%	▼12.0%
Religious affiliation, top responses	Buddhism	n/c	▲3.6%	▲4.6%
Median weekly incomes				
Personal income	Median weekly personal income		A$514	A$605
Personal income	% of Australian median income		110.3%	104.9%
Family income	Median weekly family income		A$1,164	A$1,667
Family income	% of Australian median income		113.3%	112.6%
Household income	Median weekly household income		A$1,354	A$1,463
Household income	% of Australian median income		115.6%	118.6%

== Council ==
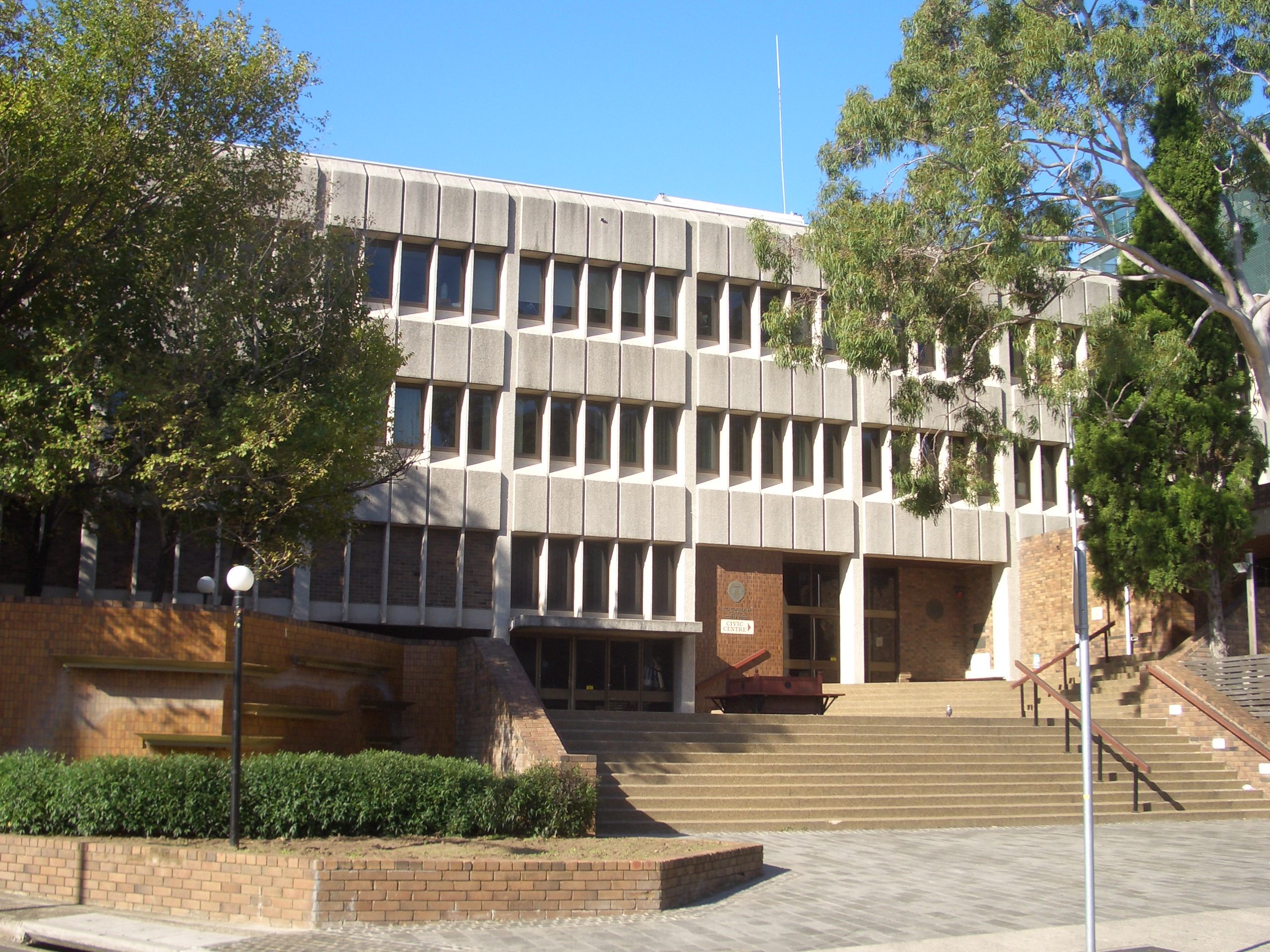
Kogarah Civic Centre, opened by Governor Sir Roden Cutler in 1973.

=== Composition and election method ===
Kogarah City Council was composed of twelve councillors elected proportionally as four separate wards, each electing three councillors. All councillors were elected for a fixed four-year term of office. The mayor was elected by the councillors at the first meeting of the council. The last election was held on 8 September 2012, and the final makeup of the council for the term 2012–2016, in order of election by ward, was as follows:

Ward	Councillor	Party	Notes
East Ward	Sam Stratikopoulos	Liberal	Councillor 2012–2016
East Ward	Michael Platt	Labor	Deputy Mayor 1996–1997, 2012–2013, Mayor 2004–2005, 2014–2015
East Ward	Annie Tang	Unity	Deputy Mayor 2005–2006, 2008–2011, 2013–2016
Middle Ward	Nickolas Varvaris	Liberal	Deputy Mayor 2004–2005, 2006–2007, Mayor 2005–2006, 2008–2013
Middle Ward	Nathaniel Smith	Liberal	Councillor 2012–2016
Middle Ward	Kathryn Landsberry	Labor	Deputy Mayor 2007–2008
North Ward	Lachlan McLean	Independent	Councillor 2008–2016
North Ward	Stephen Agius	Liberal	Mayor 2013–2014, 2015–2016
North Ward	Nick Katris	Labor	Mayor 2007–2008
West Ward	Nicholas Aroney	Liberal	Councillor 2012–2016
West Ward	George Katsabaris	Liberal	Councillor 2012–2016
West Ward	Jacinta Petroni	Labor	Deputy Mayor 2011–2012

== Mayors ==
Mayor	Party	Term	Notes
Thomas Peter Lind		September 1995 – September 1996	
Samuel Reuben Witheridge	Independent	September 1996 – September 1997	
James Jordan		September 1997 – September 1998	
Graeme Sydney Staas		September 1998 – September 1999	
Samuel Reuben Witheridge	Liberal	September 1999 – 10 September 2001	
James Robert Taylor		10 September 2001 – 13 April 2004	
Michael Platt	Labor	13 April 2004 – 26 September 2005	
Nickolas Varvaris	Liberal	26 September 2005 – 25 September 2006	
Michael Kitmiridis	Liberal	25 September 2006 – 24 September 2007	
Nickolas Katris	Labor	24 September 2007 – 29 September 2008	
Nickolas Varvaris	Liberal	29 September 2008 – 23 September 2013	
Stephen Agius	Liberal	23 September 2013 – 22 September 2014	
Michael Platt	Labor	22 September 2014 – 28 September 2015	
Stephen Agius	Liberal	28 September 2015 – 12 May 2016	

== Footnotes ==
^a Land component is 15.55 square kilometres (6.00 sq mi)
