= St George County Council =

Former electricity supply utility, in New South Wales, Australia

Coordinates: 33°58′03.0″S 151°06′12.9″E

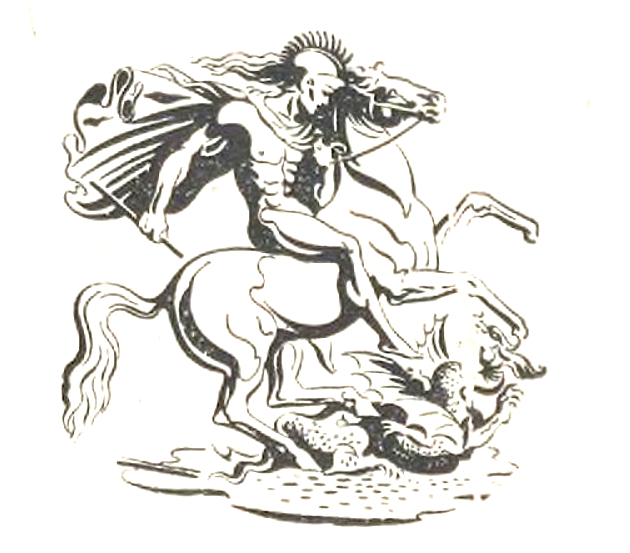
St George slaying the dragon, symbol of St George County Council.

St George County Council was a county council and local government-owned electricity supply utility in the St George area of southern Sydney, Australia. It supplied electricity to consumers in the Kogarah, Hurstville, Rockdale and Bexley Municipalities (Bexley merged with Rockdale in 1949). It existed, from 4 December 1920, until 1 January 1980 when its operations and assets, and those of Mackellar County Council and Brisbane Water County Council, were merged into the existing Sydney County Council. It obtained its bulk power from the New South Wales Government Railways (after 1932, New South Wales Department of Railways), until 1953 when the electricity generation assets of that entity became part of the Electricity Commission of New South Wales.

It was the first of many county councils, which were an important part of the mixed economy that existed in New South Wales, during the interwar and post-war periods of the 20th Century. Of the various publicly owned trading entities, the country councils were the only significant ones controlled by local governments. It was a locally owned enterprise, rather than a state-owned enterprise.

== Before the County Council ==
The St George County Council area was that of its four constituent municipalities, Kogarah, Hurstville, Rockdale, and Bexley; the area lying west of the Botany Bay, between Cooks River and Georges River and to the south of Wolli Creek.

The first electricity supply in the St George area, was that for Thomas Saywell's tramway, which ran from Rockdale railway station to the beach at Brighton-le-Sands. It was converted from steam to electric power, in 1900. An Act of the NSW Parliament, would have permitted Saywell to provide electric street lighting, for which he would have been paid, but it was never passed.

Saywell constructed a coal-fuelled powerhouse, in what had been stables at the rear of his New Brighton Hotel, at what is now Brighton-le-Sands. It used a three-wire (-240V — 0V / Ground — +240V) direct current system, giving 480V d.c. for the trams—Saywell's trams had two trolley poles, one positive and the other for negative—and 240V d.c. for other uses. The powerhouse included a large bank of batteries. As well as powering the trams and lighting his hotel, Saywell's powerhouse did supply some other customers with 'electric current'. These consumers included, by around 1911, some street lighting in the Municipality of Rockdale and some shop premises in Rockdale.

As early as 1908, some citizens were advocating that Rockdale, in cooperation with the other municipalities in the St George area, should buy Saywell's 'Electric Works' and tramway, to provide the area with electricity and expand the electric tramways. As the end of his tramway concession neared, Saywell expressed interest in providing electric street lighting for the neighbouring St George municipalities of Bexley and Kogarah, as well as more lighting in Rockdale. More distant Hurstville was almost certainly outside the distance range that Saywell's relatively low-voltage direct current system could serve, even if the small system had sufficient capacity to do that, which was unlikely.

At the expiry of Saywell's 30-year tramway operating concession in 1914, the Government Railways took over the tramway, retiring Saywell's aging trams. The government trams worked on a different current collection arrangement (one trolley pole and rail return). The tramway supply and overhead was reconfigured, and, initially, Saywell's power station continued to provide power for the government tram. In December 1917, a new tramway substation entered service, at Rockdale, supplied by a high-voltage a.c. power line from Newtown, and ultimately powered from White Bay Power Station. It was later stated that it was around the time, when Saywell's concession expired, that the idea of the St George area's being supplied with bulk power, from the NSW Railways, first took hold.

Saywell continued to generate electrical power until October 1923—also continuing to supply power to Rockdale's electric street lighting and his other consumers—despite no longer supplying the electric tramway after 1917. The tramway still was used to move coal wagons from the railway, at Rockdale, to his power station. However, Saywell's d.c. system was far too small, too unreliable, and too antiquated to serve the growing St George area.

By 1920, the St George area had a significant suburban settlement, with a population of around 57,000. It was already serviced by town gas from the Australian Gas Light Company, but there was a pent up demand for electricity. Gas could be used for cooking, space heating, water heating, and gas-powered refrigerators, but gas was an inferior choice for lighting. Moreover, within a few years, radio receivers would require electricity, as would other electrical appliances like toasters, irons, electric jugs, electric stoves and refrigerators. It was time to connect electricity to the St George area.

== Origins ==
=== Role of local government ===
==== Early local government involvement (pre-1919) ====
Local government entities in New South Wales (municipalities and shires) originally had responsibility for supply and distribution of electrical power within their boundaries. This situation led to two municipalities in Sydney having their own power stations. The first was Sydney City Council (also known, particularly relating to electricity undertaking as the City Council, or Sydney Municipal Council (SMC)), which owned Pyrmont Power Station. The second was the Municipality of Balmain, which outsourced its rights to a private company, Electric Light and Power Supply Corporation, which in turn built and operated Balmain Power Station. Municipalities, in proximity to those two, entered into arrangements to extend, into their area, a power reticulation network drawing power from either Pyrmont or Balmain. Some other municipalities, typically outside the inner suburbs, such as Manly, also had smaller power stations, but over time these power stations closed, and these areas reverted to taking their power from larger power generating entities.

==== Local Government Act (1919) and county councils ====
The preamble of Local Government Act of 1919, stated its purposes as "An Act to make better provision for the government of areas; to extend the powers and functions of local governing bodies; to establish bodies to take common action on behalf of areas ..."

417 of the Act defined the powers of a council (a city council a municipality or a shire) to establish a trading undertaking, and 418 a) of the Act, defined as a trading undertaking "a) the supply of electricity and the supply and installing of electrical fittings and appliances".

521 of the Act, covered joint undertakings by councils and that such joint undertakings could be managed either by "the councils themselves jointly, or by a joint committee composed of members of the councils." It provided the legislative framework for what would later be known as 'county councils'; a new type of publicly owned trading entity, which was a joint undertaking of more than one council, controlled by a committee composed of members of the jointly-acting councils, and which was empowered to carry out its activities, anywhere within the combined areas of those councils.

The St George County Council would be the first of this new type of trading entity in New South Wales, in 1920, but many more would be established by 1953. In 1935, the existing electricity undertaking of the Sydney City Council (SMC), by then also extending over many smaller municipalities, adopted the 'county council' structure, becoming Sydney County Council. In 1951, the electricity undertakings of Manly and Warringah Shire were merged into Mackellar County Council. By 1953, the only retail electricity suppliers, within the Sydney Metropolitan Area, that were not county councils were the two privately owned electricity utilities, Electric Light and Power Supply Corporation and Parramatta and Granville Electric Supply Company. Their distribution networks were subsequently taken over by Sydney County Council (1956) and Prospect County Council (1957), respectively. Thereafter, the publicly owned county councils controlled all retail electricity distribution in New South Wales, each within their designated areas, seemingly as natural monopolies.

County councils were an important part of the mixed economy that existed in New South Wales, during the interwar and post-war periods of the 20th Century. Of the various publicly owned trading entities, the country councils were the only significant ones controlled by local government, as opposed to state government.

=== Power for Southern Sydney ===
The four municipalities in the St George area and the neighbouring Sutherland Shire desired to extend reticulated electricity and electric street lighting to their areas. By 1919, SMC was unable to finance an extension, for such a large number of new consumers and, in any case, its generating capacity was already committed to other parts of the metropolitan area. SMC would remain constrained in its generating capacity, until it opened its second and larger power station, Bunnerong Power Station, in 1929.

The third large electricity generating entity, in the Sydney region, was New South Wales Government Railways (NSWGR), after 1932, NSW Department of Railways. It generated power for electric trams, and from 1926, electric trains, at Ultimo Power Station (from 1899) and White Bay Power Station (from 1913). Due to the travel patterns of its tramway passengers, these power stations had some spare capacity, particularly outside peak hours, and the Railway Commissioners were willing to supply bulk power.

With electrification of Sydney's suburban railways imminent, the railways were constructing a transmission line along the Illawarra railway line. The four St George municipalities and Sutherland Shire approached the Railway Commissioners about taking bulk power from the railway's network. At that time, the transmission line was only to extend as far as Hurstville—where a large railway substation was later built—meaning that Sutherland Shire reluctantly had to drop out of the proposed supply arrangement. The four St George municipalities, Kogarah, Hurstville, Rockdale, and Bexley, set up the St George County Council in December 1920.

Sutherland Shire subsequently set up its own electricity supply department, in 1925. It obtained its bulk power from New South Wales Government Railways, which had electrified the railway as far as National Park in 1926. Sutherland Shire's electricity undertaking also took over a small power supply operation at Cronulla. It was absorbed by Sydney County Council in 1954.

=== Establishment and governance ===
The four St George municipalities had petitioned the Governor of New South Wales to declare their combined area a county. The four municipalities delegated their powers "to establish and conduct an electric light and power supply undertaking," to the new St George County Council. They also delegated their power to borrow, for such purposes, initially up to £100,000.

Each of the municipal councils elected three of their aldermen each, to sit on the new county council. Those twelve members of the new county council, in turn, elected one of their number to be the President of the county council. The Minister for Local Government, Thomas Mutch, called the first meeting of the new county council, in early December 1920.

== Growth ==
=== Construction and connections ===
The initial plans to electrify the St George area included lighting over 400 miles of streets. The system would use 11kV high voltage distribution to feed substations and 415/240 V a.c. low voltage reticulation for consumers.

The new county council ratified its supply agreement with the Railway Commissioners, in June 1921. It needed to borrow to implement its network of electrical reticulation and street lighting. In May 1921, it took out a loan of £100,000, from the Commonwealth Bank, at 5% interest per annum, repayable over a term of 30 years. Tenders had been called, and work was projected to start in August 1921.

The first light pole was erected, in February 1922, at Arncliffe, and the first wires installed in June 1922. Substation No.1 is located at Arncliffe. In July 1922, new power and light poles were being erected at a rate of 200 per week. On 9 March 1923, the new electric street lighting was switched on for the first time. The event was marked by a gathering of dignitaries from local government, NSW Government, the railways, Commonwealth Bank, the consulting engineers, and construction contractors, at Kogarah. By that time, 200 miles of streets had been completed, and £50,000 of the loan had been drawn down. Originally, expected to take five years, the entire task was, by then, forecast to be completed after only two-and-a-half years.

Later, in June 1923, Rockdale Council wrote to Saywell's company, expressing gratitude that the company was continuing to supply power to those of its consumers who were yet to be connected to the new electricity supply; by November 1923, the power supply from Saywell's small 1900-vintage power station already had been discontinued, as light poles went up in Brighton-le-Sands. In December 1923, the council had just 1,023 connected premises, which included premises in all four municipalities, but was increasing at around 80 newly connected premises per fortnight.

The 1920s and 1930s saw a rapid proliferation of electrical appliances, in particular radio receivers. Some customers had only installed lighting and either had to retrofit power points, got into trouble by making unauthorised and dangerous appliance connections, or plugged appliances into a lightbulb socket. In December 1927, a new regulation was introduced mandating that any new domestic electricity connection, in the St George area, must include at least one power point. The early power points used had two round pins (no earth connection), without a switch. The first such sockets may have been to BS 73; after 1930, similar sockets, to BS 372, were manufactured in Australia. The now standard three-pin Australian power plug/socket design was introduced in 1937.

By 1928, extension of the network had required loans totalling £400,000, but by then those loans were being serviced entirely from revenues. By 1939, it had over 30,000 connected customers and 86 substations.

== Services and assets ==
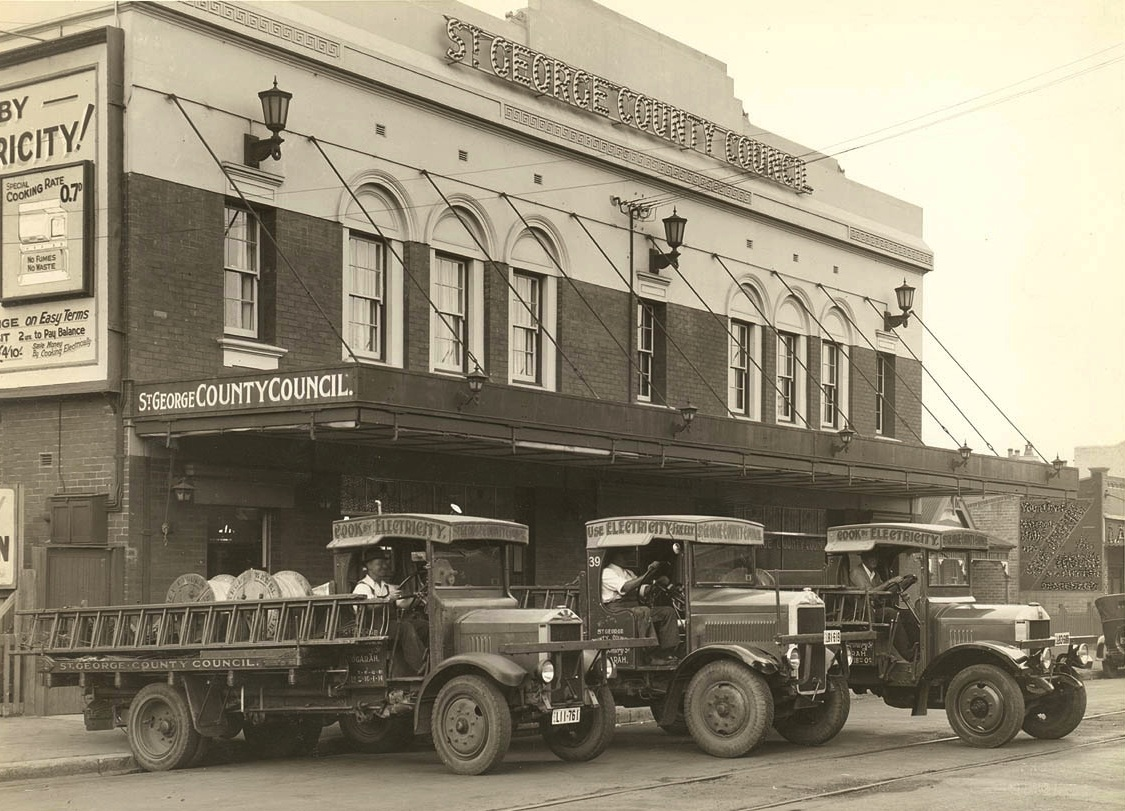
St George County Council Building, Montgomery St, Kogarah (1937)

=== First Council Building ===
Initially, the new St George County Council held its meetings at the council chambers of the Kogarah Municipal Council. In mid 1922 land was resumed in Montgomery Street, Kogarah, where the first building housing the new county council was later constructed. The foundation stone of the building was laid in September 1922.

=== Electricity House ===
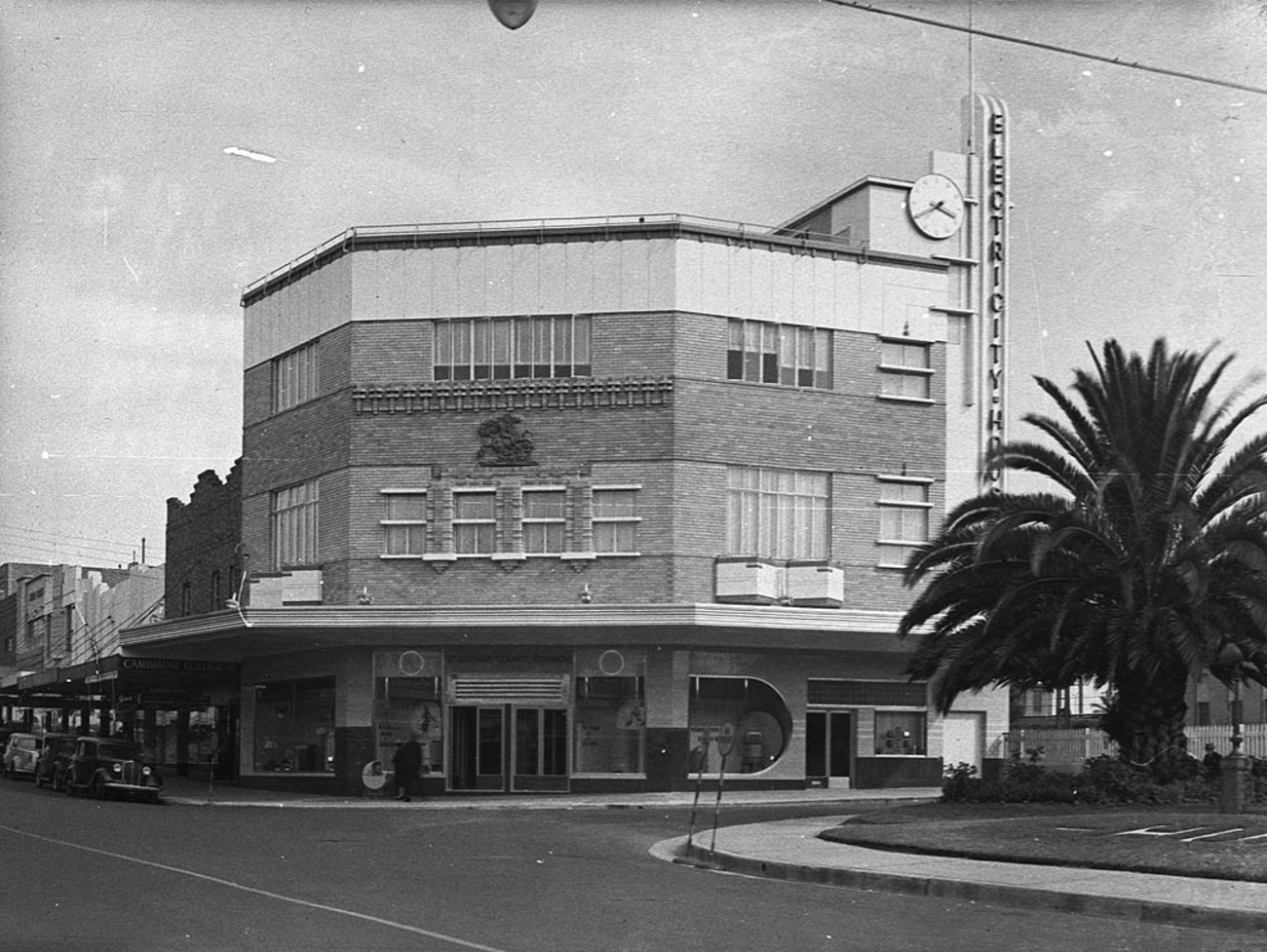
Newly finished 'Electricity House', in Hurstville, 1939 (Collection of State Library of NSW).

In 1939, St George County Council opened a new building, Electricity House, in Forest Road, Hurstville, which was devoted to customer-facing services. The headquarters remained at Kogarah.

Electricity House had three floors and a basement level. The ground floor was where customer accounts were paid and enquires could be made, with the remainder of the floor being used for displaying large and small appliances, electric ranges and water heaters. The basement level was used for a free appliance repair service and displays for domestic lighting, coppers (a large heated vessel used for boiling water and cleaning clothes) and washing machines. The first floor had a demonstration theatre, with a foyer and lounge.The second floor had facilities for cookery classes and staff rooms.

During the 1946 coal strike, which caused gas shortages, St George County Council offered a service to bake up to 500 Christmas cakes made by gas company customers, in the ovens used for cookery classes at Electricity House, and at its headquarters in Kogarah.

=== Appliance retailing ===
St George County Council retailed electrical appliances, as part of its aims to increase electricity consumption. The involvement of county councils in the retailing of appliances was somewhat controversial, and was opposed by private enterprise interests.

St George County Council was involved in a notable High Court ruling, on Section 51(xx) of the Constitution of Australia, in which the court held that a municipal corporation was to be distinguished from a trading corporation, notwithstanding the fact that it carried out trading activities (R v Trade Practices Tribunal; Ex parte St George County Council ).

== Post-war changes and proposals ==
=== Post-war generation capacity crisis ===
In the years following the Second World War, there was a rapid rise in demand for electricity. Insufficient generating capacity resulted in increasingly frequent black outs, exacerbated by strikes at power stations and the 1949 coal industry strikes, a cumulative lack of non-essential maintenance during wartime, breakdowns and lengthy repairs of critical items of equipment, and an inability to procure new capital equipment due the longer-term impacts of wartime restrictions on industry and the disruption of international trade.

New South Wales had four large electricity generating entities, together generating 93% of electricity in New South Wales, one of which was Sydney County Council. Critically, there was no single entity responsible for planning and implementation of all new generating and power transmission capacity, in New South Wales, at a time when a major expansion would inevitably occur.

=== Bulk electricity supply and county councils ===
The electricity industry in New South Wales was dramatically altered by the formation of the Electricity Commission of New South Wales (ECNSW), in 1950. Notably the Sydney County Council lost its two power stations, Pyrmont and Bunnerong, becoming only a distributor of electricity. The people in control of the new ECNSW were not drawn from the SCC's management, who had lost favour with the minister Joseph Cahill.

On 1 January 1953, the electricity generation operations of the Department of Railways became part of ECNSW, which then became the new bulk electricity supplier to St George County Council. Bulk power continued to be provided, under the same conditions as the contract with the Department of Railways, until that contract expired in April 1955.

By 1958, the two private electricity supply concerns in Sydney, Electric Light and Power Supply Corporation and Parramatta and Granville Electric Supply Company, had been nationalised. All generation and bulk electricity supply was, thereafter, by ECNSW, and all local electricity reticulation was by one of the county councils. Some large consumers such as the Department of Railways, once a generator, took power directly from ECNSW.

=== Lugarno power station project ===
From 1947, Sydney County Council had plans to erect a coal-fired power station, on the Georges River, at 'Lugarno', but the site was actually on the southern side of the river, opposite Lugarno. The site was just outside the area supplied by St George County Council. The site was in line with the SCC's prior practice of placing generation close to consumers, but there was local opposition to the proposal.

The new station was to be SCC's means of increasing its generating capacity, in response to the power supply crisis, and was regarded as a priority project. Once ECNSW was formed, it took control of the Lugarno power station project. The Lugarno power station project was effectively abandoned, when it was deferred in November 1950.

ECNSW adopted the practice of siting power stations near coal mines, and using large transmission lines to feed centres of population, which had already begun to be implemented by Department of Railways and Southern Electricity Supply. The tenders received for the Lugarno power station were reused as the basis of Wallerawang 'A' power station. St George County Council would receive additional power via a new 132kV transmission line from Port Kembla and the new Tallawarra power station.

=== Amalgamation proposals ===
The Sydney Council took over the electricity undertaking of Sutherland Council, in 1954, and there were suggestions that it would become the sole electricity supply authority for the County of Cumberland, which included the St George area. Such an outcome did not eventuate at the time.

In 1961, there was again talk of amalgamation of the metropolitan county councils, as a single state-owned supply authority, stoked by the difference in electricity prices between metropolitan county council areas. Once again, it came to nothing.

== Demise and aftermath ==
=== Merger into Sydney County Council ===
Sydney County Council had been established under an act of the NSW Parliament, the Gas and Electricity Act 1935. This was amended, in November 1979, to enlarge SCC's area by merging into it three adjoining county council areas, one of which was St George County Council.

There was some resentment that the merger was effectively an expropriation, by Sydney County Council, of assets owned by constituent local governments of the abolished county councils. There was opposition to the merger from residents and staff of St George County Council. The assets of the county councils were frozen, after Mackellar County Council attempted to transfer ownership of two buildings, one to Manly Council and the other to Warringah Shire Council.

In December 1979, it was proclaimed that St George County Council, Brisbane Water County Council, and Mackellar County Council would be dissolved and merged into the existing Sydney County Council, on 1 January 1980. The entity remained a county council, but one with an expanded constituency. Representation on Sydney County Council was provided for Hurstville, Kogarah and Rockdale municipalities.

=== Dissolution of the county councils ===
The electricity reforms of 1945 cast a long shadow of the state's remaining electricity county councils. Section 12 of the Electricity Development Act 1945 (1946 No 13), provided that the Governor may, by proclamation, change the boundaries of a county council.

The NSW Parliament passed the Sydney Electricity Act, in December 1990. The Act abolished Sydney County Council and transferred its assets and obligations to a new state-owned corporation, Sydney Electricity. The new entity was required to pay a dividend to the NSW Government.

Regional electricity county councils, outside the Sydney Metropolitan Area, were similarly dissolved, on 1 July 1993, and their areas of supply and assets given to new electricity supply entities, which were also state-owned corporations of the NSW Government. The proclamation referenced the 'Electricity Act 1945', which was a reference to the Electricity Development Act 1945 (1946 No 13), which had been renamed the "Electricity Act 1945" by Electricity Development (Amendment) Act 1987 (1987 No 104), Schedule 2 section (1).

Each of the new state-owned entities was run by a board of directors, who had nothing to do with local government. The era of local government involvement in electricity supply had ended. The NSW Government had taken over the assets, without compensation to the former owners, the constituent local governments.

There are still county councils in New South Wales, but none are involved in the supply of electricity, their remaining functions include water supply, weed management and flood mitigation.

=== Corporatisation ===
The NSW Government gave itself new powers over the state-owned corporations that replaced the county councils, in 1995. The Electricity Supply Act of 1995, among other things, removed the last footprint of local government, by removing the nexus between electricity supply areas and local government boundaries. It also allowed the government to merge or reconfigure the state-owned entities.

Two government-owned entities, Sydney Electricity and Orion Energy—covering the area of the former Shortland County Council / Shortland Electricity, Newcastle and the Hunter Valley—subsequently merged to form EnergyAustralia, in March 1996.

=== Partial privatisation ===
EnergyAustralia's retail business was sold to CLP Group, in March 2011. The remnant distribution business was renamed Ausgrid, and initially remained a state-owned corporation. Characterised as 'the poles and wires', Ausgrid was partially privatised by the sale of a 99-year lease of 50.4% of the entity to an Australian-based consortium of AustralianSuper and IFM Investors, in 2016, for a sum of $16 billion. The NSW Government remains the passive, other shareholder. The funds obtained were used for various purposes, including construction of Sydney Metro.

== Remnants ==
The former distribution network of St George County Council is now controlled by Ausgrid.

There are still substations, in the St George area, which were built by St George County Council and carry its signage. Its building in Hurstville, 'Electricity House', built in 1939, is now a branch of the Bank of China. The older St George County Council building, in Montgomery St, Kogarah, was demolished, but its foundation stones were saved and incorporated into the forecourt of the St George Bank building.

Various cookbooks published by the St George County Council can still be found, notably The St George "all electric" cookbook and yearly cookbooks dating from the 1970s.

Two histories of St George County Council were published; Electricity supply undertaking : twelve years of progress, 1920-1932 and The first fifty years, 1920-1970 : electricity supply undertaking.
