= Bloss =

Bloss is a surname. Notable people with the surname include:

- Jake Bloss (born 2001), American baseball player
- John M. Bloss (1839–1905), American teacher
- Margaret Varner Bloss (born 1927), retired American athlete
- Michael Bloss (born 1986), German politician
- Nick van Bloss (born 1967), English classical pianist
- Phil Bloss (born 1953), English former footballer
- Rainer Bloss (1946–2015), German electronic musician
- Werner H. Bloss (1930–1995), German scientist in the field of photovoltaics
- Will Bloss (1869–1921), American football coach
- Benny Bloss (born 1997), American Motocross racer

== See also ==
- John Bloss (disambiguation), various people
