= Blass =

Blass is a surname. Notable people with the surname include:

- Andreas Blass, American mathematician
- Bill Blass (1922–2002), American fashion designer
- Dave Blass, American production designer
- Friedrich Blass (1843–1907), German classical scholar
- Moses Blass (born 1937), Brazilian Olympic basketball medallist
- Richard Blass (1945–1975), Canadian gangster and a multiple murderer
- Simcha Blass, (1897–1982), Israeli water engineer, inventor of drip irrigation systems
- Steve Blass, baseball player and announcer
- Tatiana Blass (born 1979), Brazilian artist
- Valentin Blass, (born 1995) German basketball player
- Valérie Blass (born 1967), Canadian artist
- William Joel Blass, Mississippi attorney, educator, and politician
- Wolf Blass, East German-born Australian winemaker

== See also ==
- DJ Blass, Puerto-Rican record producer
- Blas
