= Municipality of Bexley =

Former local government area in New South Wales, Australia

Municipality of Bexley New South Wales
- Population: 26,862 (1947 census)
  - Density: 3,461.6/km^{2} (8,965/sq mi)
- Established: 28 June 1900
- Abolished: 31 December 1948
- Area: 7.76 km^{2} (3.0 sq mi)
- Council seat: Bexley Council Chambers
- Region: St George
- Parish: St. George
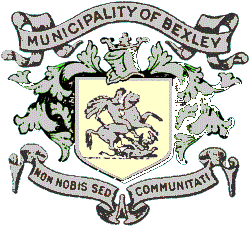
LGAs around Municipality of Bexley:
	Canterbury
Hurstville	Municipality of Bexley	Rockdale
	Kogarah

The Municipality of Bexley was a local government area in the St George region of Sydney, New South Wales, Australia. The municipality was proclaimed as the Borough of Bexley on 28 June 1900 when it formally separated from the Municipal District of Hurstville, and included the modern suburbs of Bexley, Bexley North and Kingsgrove, with parts of Carlton, Bardwell Park, Bardwell Valley, Rockdale and Kogarah. From 1 January 1949, the council was amalgamated into the Municipality of Rockdale, with the passing of the Local Government (Areas) Act 1948.

== Council history and location ==
The Bexley area was first incorporated on 25 March 1887, when the NSW Government Gazette published the proclamation declaring the "Municipal District of Hurstville", with its wards being created on 29 December 1887, including the "Bexley Ward". Although originally very much of a rural character, by the turn of the 20th century the population of the Bexley Ward area had reached 2850 and a group of local residents, including all three Bexley Ward aldermen, submitted a petition on 16 November 1899 to the NSW Governor, Earl Beauchamp, requesting the formation of a municipality with the name of the "Borough of Bexley", arguing that under the current arrangements in Hurstville, the Bexley Ward area was under-represented compared to its rate-paying contribution and was geographically distant from the rest of the council area The petition was subsequently accepted and the Bexley Borough Council was incorporated on 28 June 1900.

The first council was elected on 11 August 1900, with nine aldermen elected:

Alderman	Notes
George Thomas Richards	Hurstville Bexley Ward Alderman 1898–1900. Telegraph operator, Dunmore Street, Bexley.
Alexander Craig Reed	Law stationer, Gladstone Street, Bexley.
James William Larbalestier	Hurstville Bexley Ward Alderman 1898–1900. Boot manufacturer, Monomeeth Street, Bexley.
Charles Henry Austin	Hurstville Bexley Ward Alderman 1894–1898. Public accountant, Gladstone Street, Bexley.
Charles Amey Howard	Landed proprietor, Stoney Creek Road, Kingsgrove.
Joseph Godwin	Warehouseman, Highgate Street, Bexley.
William Edward Paine	Contractor, Bayview Street, Bexley.
John Cooper	Saddle and harness manufacturer, Fleet Street, Carlton.
Richard Sanders	Salesman, Union Street, Kogarah.

The council first met in the Debating Society Hall in Carlton on 15 August 1900, with Alderman James William Larbalestier elected as the first mayor. On 13 September, Alderman Charles Henry Austin was appointed Treasurer. On 11 November 1901, the Council Chambers on corner of Queen Victoria and Northbrook Streets, Bexley, was officially opened with a hybrid design consisting of alderman Paine's floorplan and architect William Kenwood's facade. From 28 December 1906, following the passing of the Local Government Act, 1906, the council was renamed as the "Municipality of Bexley".

=== Later history ===
In December 1920, Bexley combined with the councils of Rockdale, Hurstville, and Kogarah to form the St George County Council. The elected County Council was established to provide electricity to the Kogarah, Rockdale, Hurstville, and Bexley areas and ceased to exist when it was amalgamated with the Sydney County Council from 1 January 1980. Although for most of its history, Bexley council was elected at-large, on 18 March 1942 the municipality was divided into four wards: North, South, East and West wards.

By the end of the Second World War, the NSW Government had realised that its ideas of infrastructure expansion could not be effected by the present system of the patchwork of small municipal councils across Sydney and the Minister for Local Government, Joseph Cahill, passed a bill in 1948 that abolished a significant number of those councils. Under the Local Government (Areas) Act 1948, Bexley Municipal Council became the First Ward of the Municipality of Rockdale, which was located immediately to the east.

== Mayors ==
Years	Mayor	Notes
15 August 1900 – 13 July 1901	James William Larbalestier	
13 July 1901 – 15 February 1902	William Edward Paine	
15 February 1902 – 28 October 1902	Henry Watson Harradence	
28 October 1902 – 5 February 1903	James William Larbalestier	
5 February 1903 – 17 February 1904	William Edward Paine	
17 February 1904 – 11 February 1905	Richard Sanders	
11 February 1905 – 16 February 1906	Joseph Godwin	
16 February 1906 – 10 February 1908	Charles Amey Howard	
10 February 1908 – 24 March 1909	Charles Albert Biddulph	
24 March 1909 – 8 February 1910	John George Griffin	
8 February 1910 – 24 February 1911	Charles Albert Biddulph	
24 February 1911 – 6 February 1912	Charles Amey Howard	
6 February 1912 – 6 February 1914	Job John Frederick Lawrence	
6 February 1914 – 2 February 1915	David Turnbull Brown	
2 February 1915 – February 1917	William John Berryman	
February 1917 – 4 February 1919	David Turnbull Brown	
4 February 1919 – 13 December 1920	William Frederick Brown	
13 December 1920 – December 1922	Frederick Percival Dowsett	
December 1922 – 12 June 1923	John George Griffin	
12 June 1923 – 15 December 1925	Frederick Shrosbree Stephens	
15 December 1925 – December 1927	Joseph Thomas Foster Barwell	
December 1927 – December 1928	Henry Todd	
December 1928 – December 1930	Charles Albert Biddulph	
December 1930 – December 1932	George Ryan	
December 1932 – 5 December 1934	Charles Albert Biddulph	
5 December 1934 – 7 December 1937	Joseph Thomas Foster Barwell	
7 December 1937 – December 1938	Thomas Henry Spanswick	
December 1938 – December 1940	Joseph Thomas Foster Barwell	
December 1940 – 8 December 1942	Archibald Neil Macdonald	
8 December 1942 – 12 December 1944	Frederick Percival Dowsett	
12 December 1944 – 31 December 1948	Albert Mainerd	

== Town Clerks ==
Years	Town Clerk	Notes
15 August 1900 – 13 September 1900	Gustav Adolf Griesbach (acting)	
13 September 1900 – 10 December 1902	Thomas Hector Wearne	
10 December 1902 – 4 April 1937	Richard Watson Churchill	
4 April 1937 – 25 August 1944	Ernest Stanley Fowler	
25 August 1944 – 31 December 1948	Andrew Emslie Robb	
