= John Bloss =

John Bloss may refer to:

- John M. Bloss (1839–1905), American Civil War soldier and administrator
- John Bloss (American football), for Iona Gaels football
- John Bloss (politician), see Political party strength in Indiana
- John Bloss (judge), North Carolina judicial elections, 2010
