= History of Brighton-Le-Sands, New South Wales =

Brighton-le-Sands: a brief history to 31 January 1971, prior to the name change for the suburb

Brighton-Le-Sands is a suburb of Sydney, in the state of New South Wales, Australia. The suburb is on Lady Robinson Beach, at Botany Bay, in Bayside Council. Prior to 1970 the official name for the suburb was Brighton-le-Sands, a name which remained in use for many years after the official change of the name. This history concentrates on the period after European settlement to the 1970s.

== Names ==
The spelling of the suburb was originally Brighton-le-Sands, using a lower case "l" in "le" (SMH) until it was officially changed in 1970, although the reason for this change is not clear. Both versions of the name are used, as well as the alternative Brighton Le Sands (without the hyphens). Other names in common use are Brighton and Brighton Beach. In this article, the name is spelt as it was in the original source: CER, TD. The 1992 Sydney Telephone Directory used the notation Brighton-le-Sands when referring to the suburb and its occupants: see entries in the 1992 telephone directory.

== European settlement ==
Settlements developed along the shores of Lady Robinson Beach in the 19th century. By 1870 there were settlements close to Muddy Creek. One of these settlements, the hamlet which developed along its coastline, east of Rockdale, was called Lady Robinson's Beach for a brief period in the 1880s. This hamlet grew into the suburb of 'Brighton-le-Sands'.

== Boundaries ==
Lady Robinson Beach and Cook Park form the eastern border of Brighton-Le-Sands, on Botany Bay, south of Port Jackson. This section of Lady Robinson beach is also commonly referred to as Brighton Beach or Brighton Le Sands Beach. The northern boundary of Brighton-Le-Sands is Bestic Street. President Avenue forms the southern boundary. To the west the boundary is more tortuous. Initially it runs along Muddy Creek, through White Oak Reserve to Bruce Street where the boundary turns west along Bruce Street. It continues south briefly just east of West Botany Street running south-east down Bay Street until it is just east of Aero Street. From here the boundary runs in a straight line in a south-westerly direction to President Avenue, immediately north of the lakes of the Rockdale Bicentennial Park: see Sydways Street Directory, 2001.

== 19th century development of Lady Robinson's Beach ==
=== Early land acquisitions ===
Land acquisitions in the district began in the 1840s but no significant development occurred until the railway opened to Hurstville, via Rockdale in 1884: see New South Wales Government Gazettes, POD.

In 1877 it was decided to extend Bay Street, Rockdale to the coast. Before this extension could proceed it was necessary to build a bridge over Muddy Creek, a tributary of Cooks River. Then in 1880 Bestic Street, Rockdale was also extended by linking it to Goode's Road. The two roads were slightly out of alignment which accounts for the slight bend present in Bestic Street. Making this link necessitated a second bridge over Muddy Creek. In 1883 Thomas Saywell suggested extending the road to the beach: Archives Rockdale Municipal Library, POD.

=== Building the tramway ===
Following the completion of the railway Thomas Saywell decided, in 1885, to construct a tramway along Bay Street from Rockdale to Lady Robinson Beach. It was a single track except at each terminus and for a short section at the Farr Street stop to allow trams to pass mid-way along the track. A tram depot was erected south of West Botany Street on land which is now Tony Baker Reserve: CER, POD, Street Directories. Saywell had a 30-year lease on the tramway. In 1914 the Government of the day took control of the tramway. Eventually the tramline was electrified: SMH 28 July 1900 p11. The tram was replaced by buses in 1949. It took another ten years before the old tram tracks were removed and Bay Street was re-surfaced to assist with the problems ensuing from the increasing number of cars now using the road: Archives Rockdale Municipal Library, POD. There are many references to this tramway in the Sydney Morning Herald, now available on the internet, q.v.

=== 1890s ===
The land may have been unsuitable for agriculture but its location was ideal for a pleasure resort. The region was well served by public transport in an era and in a country where travelling was still difficult. Access to Rockdale had been difficult. Initially the route to the area was via what is now Canterbury, then by horse coach across a dam spanning Cooks River at Tempe. When road and rail bridges replaced the dam carriageway in the 1880s progress ensued. Travelling to Rockdale, and hence to Brighton, became easier: Archives Rockdale Municipal Library.

Thomas Saywell suggested the name New Brighton Estate for the developing settlement. The beach reminded him of Brighton beach in England and so he began to develop the resort he envisaged, similar to the English seaside resort: Archives Rockdale Municipal Library.

Thomas Saywell first built the public swimming baths which were completed in the late 1880s. There were actually two bathing areas, one for men and one for women with a wharf between. Amateur fishermen lined the shores of the bay or fished from small water craft and the promenade of the baths. Nearby, on the south west corner of Bay Street and Grand Parade, adjacent to the new tram terminus, he established a picnic area, later known as the Shady Nook Recreation Grounds: Archives Rockdale Municipal Library, POD, SMH SMH 10 November 1897 p5; SMH 7 DEC 1903.

Saywell also built the Brighton Hotel on the north west corner of the two streets. However the hotel lost its licence in 1892 due to the behaviour of its patrons. At the instigation of Arthur Aspinall, the Presbyterian Church was looking for a building suitable to establish a boarding school for the children of outback pastoralists. Thomas Saywell offered the use of the building to the Church for the establishment of The Scots College. Arthur Aspinall, a co-founder of the college, became its first principal: SMH 30 January 1893 p6; 15 December 1893 p3; 10 December 1013 p20. Suitable changes were made to the building to adapt it as a boarding school. The school remained at Brighton for about four years. Eventually the hotel was re-licensed and remained on the site until it was replaced by the Millers Brighton Hotel and later the Novotel Brighton Beach Motor Inn: TD.

In 1895 Thomas Saywell decided to build a race course in Brighton. The Scots College found the race course and the distraction of the beach for its pupils unacceptable and left the area. The racecourse operated for many years: Archives Rockdale Municipal Library; SMH 25 January 1896, p12.

During this period this small settlement, the New Brighton Estate, was still officially part of Rockdale even though it was known amongst the locals as "Brighton".

The economic depression of the 1890s began to have a social impact on the area. As more people of few material means began to settle in the district the standard of living declined. The suburb recovered to some extent in the 1920s but it remained predominantly a working-class domain until the 1970s.

== 20th-century development ==
=== 1900s to 1930s ===
The "Brighton-le-Sands Post and Telegraph Office" was opened in about 1903 (1904 edition of the Sands Post Office Directory) giving the suburb its distinct name to distinguish it from Brighton in England. About this time a ferry service opened in Botany Bay. This allowed many more people to take advantage of the picnic facilities at Brighton. The ferry operated for about 20 years: Archives Rockdale Municipal Library, POD.

The phrase "Lady Robindon's Beach" remained in use for many years after the name change for the suburb. Gradually the use of the name became confined to the actual sandy beach rather than to the suburb: (see editions of the Sydney Morning Herald up to 29 December 1925 and possibly beyond that date).

From 1900 to 1912 Brighton was in the Commonwealth Electorate of Lang. A map of the area is given in the 1909 Electoral Roll. In 1913 the district was transferred to the electorate of Illawarra. Another map is provided in the 1915 electoral roll. It is very similar to the map of 1909. The electorate of Barton, which included Brighton-le-Sands was established in 1922. In the electoral rolls a number of abbreviations are used for the name of the suburb including: "B-l-S", "B.-le-S", "Br-le-S" and "Br.-le-S". World War I also slowed development of the suburb.

In 1904 there was a meeting hall called Saywell's Concert Hall: SMH 12 DEC 1904, p5. The obituary of Samuel Cook, after whom the foreshore Cooks Park was named, appeared in the Sydney Morning Heraldon 4 July 1910 p9

After World War I, considerable expansion of the area began. Soon the residential potential of the suburb had almost tripled in size; POD. To the south of Bay Street the area west of the bay bounded by Bay Street, Crawford Road and President Avenue was developed. To the west of the New Brighton Estate Francis Lane (later known as Francis Lane Road and then Francis Avenue) was built: CER. The streets of the Estate between The Grand Parade and The Avenue north of Bay Street, as far north as Selwood Street, were extended west to reach Francis Lane. The Avenue was extended north to Bestic Street. Reading Road was constructed to its west along with Henson Street, Rowley Street and Cashman Road; see maps provided in the various electoral rolls.

The district had even more expansion from the mid-1920s until the Great Depression of the early 1930s: POD. The land beside Muddy Creek at the northern end of Francis Avenue was originally a swamp. After the swamp was drained in about 1924, Francis Avenue was extended past Henson Street to Bestic Street. The reclaimed land was used for homes in Yarran Avenue, Carinya Avenue and the eastern side of Francis Avenue. Beyond Carinya Avenue there was a dairy with a live-in residence and Tasker's market garden, abutting Bestic Street. The dairy at 35 Francis Avenue was owned by James Erskine: CER, POD.

The land on Bay street owned by the Francis family was sold. Francis Lane Avenue, as it was originally called, was built as far as Selwood street. Houses were constructed intermittently along its length. Later some of the land was sold to the Roman Catholic Church for the construction of St Thomas More's Church and denominational primary school. When The Avenue was continued past Selwood Street to Bestic Street it was renamed Moate Avenue: CER, POD.

Several isolated shops were built in Rowley Street to cater for the daily needs of the local inhabitants of this new housing development. A butcher shop was built on the north west corner of Rowley Street and Moate Avenue. Diagonally opposite there was a general store. Both of these shops were still open in the first decade of the 21st century. Purnell's greengrocery and milk bar was located on the north side of Rowley Street between Moate Avenue and Reading Road: E. A fourth shop was built on the south west corner of The Rowley Street/Reading Road intersection.

=== 1940s to 1970s ===
Just as Australia began to recover from the Depression of the early 1930s, World War II started. Development of Brighton remained stagnant. After World War II, Sydney experienced a severe housing shortage. All suitable, available land was acquired for new housing. Brighton began its third major period of growth.

A three hectare vacant area known locally as Archbald's Paddock extended from Henson Street to Bestic Street. It was located between Yarran Avenue, Carinya Avenue, the dairy and market gardens to the west and Rowley Street and Cashman Road to the east. Walking tracks linked these various streets. The property had once belonged to the Archbald family. Grace Archbald, the last surviving member of the family and unmarried died in 1942: [NSW BDM Index on the Internet]. The ramshackled old house soon degenerated further and was vandalised. Remnants of the foundations of some of their buildings and some of their shrubs remained east of Yarran Avenue. Also, with the advent of widespread refrigeration and bottled milk the dairy was no longer required in the region. The paddocks were sold: CER, POD, street directories.

In the late 1940s the first part of Archbald's Paddock to be released for housing was that located along Henson Street. Soon afterwards the remainder of the land and the dairy paddock were amalgamated to become a housing estate. Archbald Avenue was built from Bestic Street through the centre of the former Archbald Paddock with links to all the surrounding streets. MacIntyre Avenue was constructed through the former dairy paddock between Francis Avenue and the new Archbald Avenue. People began to move into the houses of both Archbald Avenue and MacIntyre Avenue about 1952. Tasker's Market garden still operated at the corner of Bestic Street and Francis Avenue: CER, TD.

On the western side of Francis Avenue housing stopped at number 64, opposite number eleven, just past Henson Street. North of number 64 was another market garden known as Hop Long's. This property extended from Bestic Street to behind the houses in Francis Avenue and across to Muddy Creek. In the late 1940s the frontage of the market garden along Francis Avenue was acquired and houses built, except for an access area to the market garden and its dwelling. In the mid-1950s this market garden was transformed into an extension of the White Oak Reserve.

Eventually, about ten years later, Tasker's market garden and number 35 Francis Avenue, where the Erskines had continued to live, were also sold. This parcel of land became the site of Bilmark Place and Phillip Crescent: CER.

== Late 20th century to present ==
The ethnicity and socio-economic status altered as the former residents died or left the suburb. Their houses were pulled down and replaced by the many multi-storeyed blocks of units which are now the dominant housing. The shopping centre changed considerably, to cater to the needs of the changed population.

== Storm damage ==
Several times the bridge over Muddy Creek at Bestic Street was flooded to the extent of making it impassable, or even washing the bridge away. Similar problems arose for the bridge over the creek at Bay Street. The floods were particularly bad when water cascading down the hills on the two streets coincided with a high tide in the creek: Archives Rockdale Municipal Library.

Wind storms would deposit sand on Grand Parade and The Esplanade making them impassable and eroding the sand dunes. Periodically wave damage would erode the beach. The worst damage to the beach occurred on 13 June 1966 (Sydney Morning Herald, 15 June 1966).

== Brighton-le-Sands Primary School ==
The initial school building was located on the west side of Crawford Road between Kurnell Street and Kings Road. As the population of the suburb increased land was resumed further south on Crawford Road, between Kings Road and O'Neill Street. Here two buildings were constructed in 1916: an infants' school to cater for the first three years of schooling and the main upper primary school: CER, POD.

== Medical services ==
The Pacific Private Hospital was located initially on The Esplanade. By 1930 the hospital had relocated to Queens Road. Bigger facilities were built on the south east corner of the intersection of Bay Street and West Botany Street by 1936.

A private convalescent hospital, East Lynn run by Matron Maudie Shaw, opened at 13 Henson Street in the mid-1930s soon after the extension of Henson Street past Reading Road. Matron Shaw's husband was in the Royal Australian Navy: CER. Many of the patients were overseas sailors recuperating from illness or accidents. These sailors were waiting until they were well enough to return home or to rejoin their ships when the ships were next in port. By the 1950s the number of sailors needing convalescence had reduced greatly. The hospital now catered to a wider range of needs within the local population. Matron Shaw retired in the 1960s: CER, TD.

By 1925 a doctors surgery had been opened on the south west corner of the intersection of Crawford Road with Bay Street: POD. Adelaide Croucher, chiropodist, conducted a business in her own home from the mid-1940s. Initially this was at 17 Francis Avenue, then later from 6 Carinya Avenue : TD. She also visited many clients in their own homes. On Wednesdays she worked at the local hairdressing salon on Bay Street. As people sat under the hairdryer they would have their feet attended to as well.

== Notable residents ==
- Michael Dransfield, poet, grew up in Brighton Le Sands
- June Salter, actress, grew up in Brighton Le Sands and was educated at the local primary school
