= Buckeye Leadership Society =

Honorary leadership Society at The Ohio State University

The Buckeye Leadership Society (BLS) is an honorary leadership organization at Ohio State University in Ohio in the United States. Established on campus in 2004, it currently has over 300 members.

The Society is affiliated with the Ohio Union and its leadership development programs.

The chapter's daily duties are carried out by a group of second and third year members who serve as Mentors. The Mentors work with the staff advisors to coordinate programs, events, group activities, leadership, and service opportunities on campus.
