= Valentin Blass =

German basketball player (born 1995)

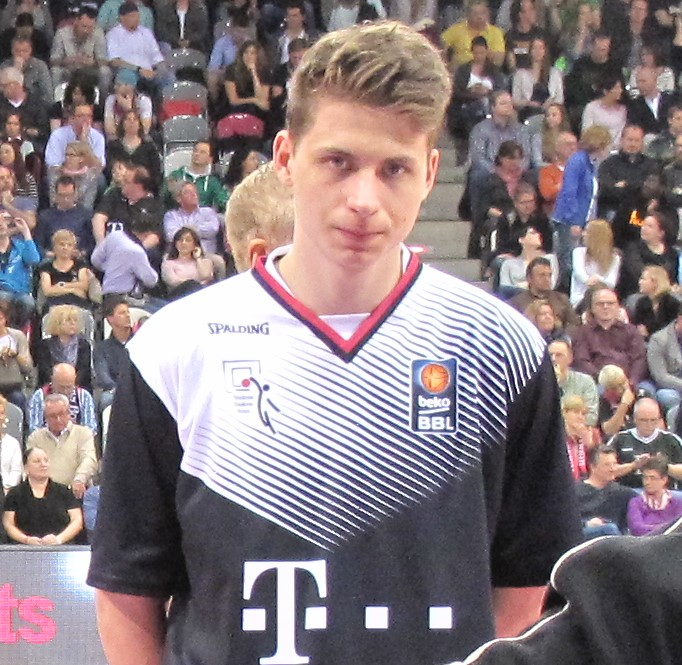

No. 8 – Bayer Giants Leverkusen
- Position: Small forward / shooting guard
- League: ProA

Personal information
- Born: April 17, 1995 (age 30) Munich, Germany
- Listed height: 6 ft 5 in (1.96 m)
- Listed weight: 209 lb (95 kg)

Career information
- Playing career: 2012–present

Career history
- 2013–2017: Telekom Baskets Bonn
- 2018–present: Bayer Giants Leverkusen

Valentin Lukas Blass (born 17 April 1995) is a German professional basketball player who formerly played for the Telekom Baskets Bonn of the German Basketball League.
