= Brighton le Sands =

Brighton le Sands can refer to the following locations:

- Brighton-le-Sands, Merseyside, England
- Brighton-Le-Sands, New South Wales, Australia
