= Police Citizens Youth Club =

Youth organizations in Australia

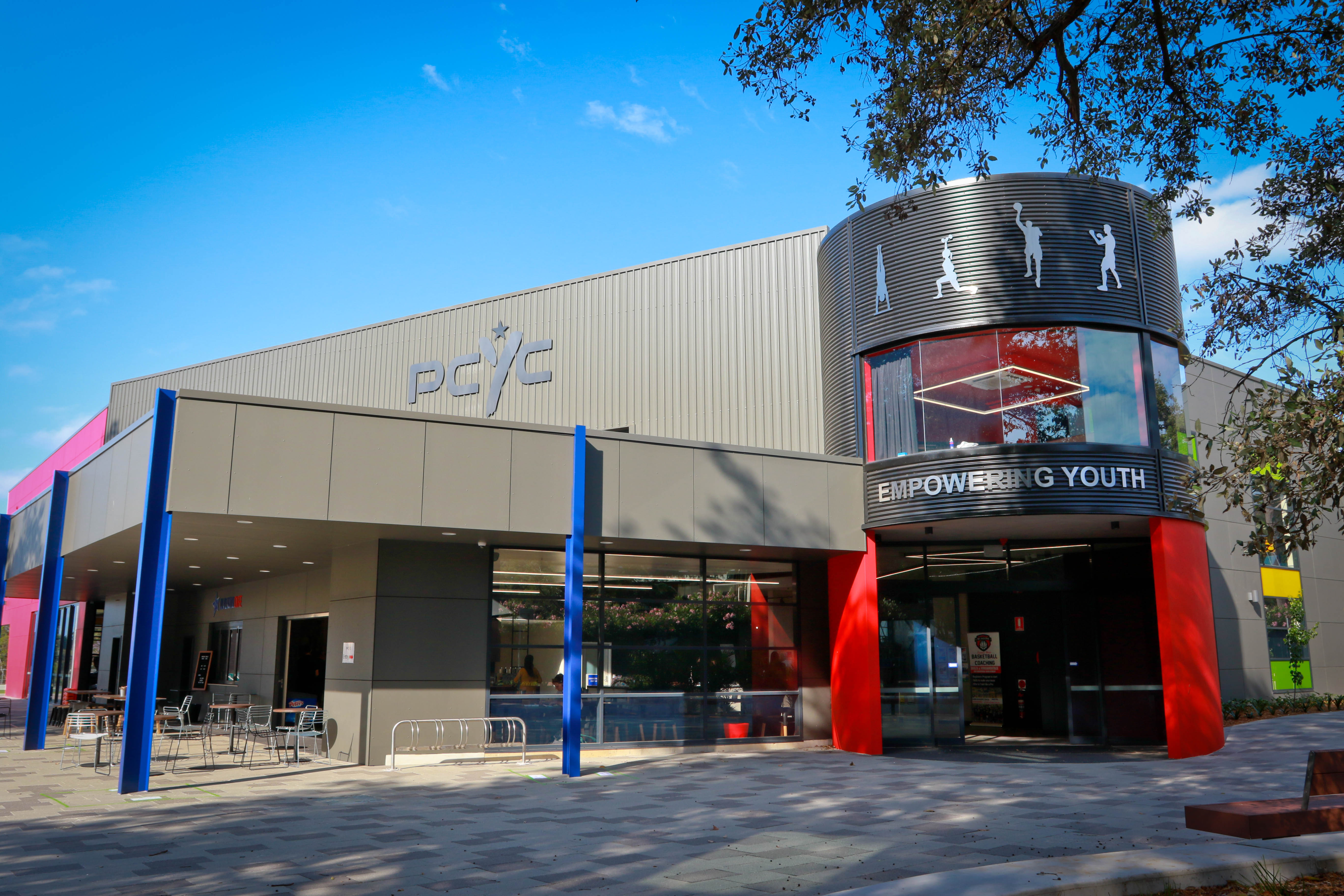
PCYC Hornsby/Ku-ring-gai

Police & Community Youth Clubs (PCYC) or Police and Community Youth Clubs is a network of Australian non-profit, community organisations, founded in New South Wales. In some states such as NSW, they are constituted as an Incorporated Association.

The mission of PCYC is to get young people active in life; develop their skills, character and leadership; and prevent and reduce crime by and against young people. The organisation is community-based and involves the provision of low-cost structured activities to children and adults, aimed specifically at the underprivileged persons in the community. The clubs contain a wide variety of sports such as basketball, indoor soccer, weightlifting gyms, dancing, wrestling/grappling, boxing, martial arts, chess, and many other activities and hobbies. Different clubs may have different activities going on to one another. The PCYC has a range of over 66 clubs across the state.

== History ==
The first PCYC was opened in Woolloomooloo, New South Wales on 1 April 1937 by the Police Commissioner, William John Mackay. They were originally known as the "Police Rotary Youth Club", and later, "Police Boy's Clubs".

In 1936, Mackay visited England, Germany, Italy and the US with the brief of “reviewing the methods of combating crime”. He praised the labour youth battalions because, he said, they "subordinate the individual to the welfare of the nation". Upon returning to Australia, he garnered the support of the Rotary Clubs in Australia, who provided financial support and set up the first Police Boys Club. As recorded in "Achieving for Others: Rotary Club of Sydney 1921 - 2005" "'Sir Henry Braddon KBE, the then President of The Rotary Club of Sydney 1935-1936, at a meeting of the Board on 8 July 1935 strongly advocated the adoption of a community service project. A fortnight later he brought before the Board a scheme involving the conversion of a disused Police Station into club rooms for boys. The idea had come from fellow Rotarian, Bill Mackay, the Commissioner of Police. A correspondent to the Sydney Morning Herald later praised Mackay as deserving of 'great credit' for having conceived 'such as practical and national-minded scheme'". The police agreed to make unwanted police stations available and to provide staff and management, the government promised to pay for converting the buildings and the Rotary Club of Sydney agreed to bear the cost of equipment, furniture and a library. Renovation of the Woolloomooloo police station began in May 1936, work was completed by March 1937 and the Club was opened on April 1, 1937.

== States ==
Name and locations of PCYC's in each state.

- Police Citizens Youth Clubs NSW
- Police Citizens Youth Club Queensland
- Western Australia Police & Community Youth Centre
- Tasmanian Association of Police & Community Youth Clubs
- Victoria Police & Citizens Youth Club
  - Blue Light Victoria
    - Kyabram Blue Light (Central Victoria)
    - Bendigo Blue Light
    - Alpine Blue Light
    - Mernda Blue Light
- Canberra Police & Community Youth Club
