= Regions of Sydney =

Regions within Greater Sydney

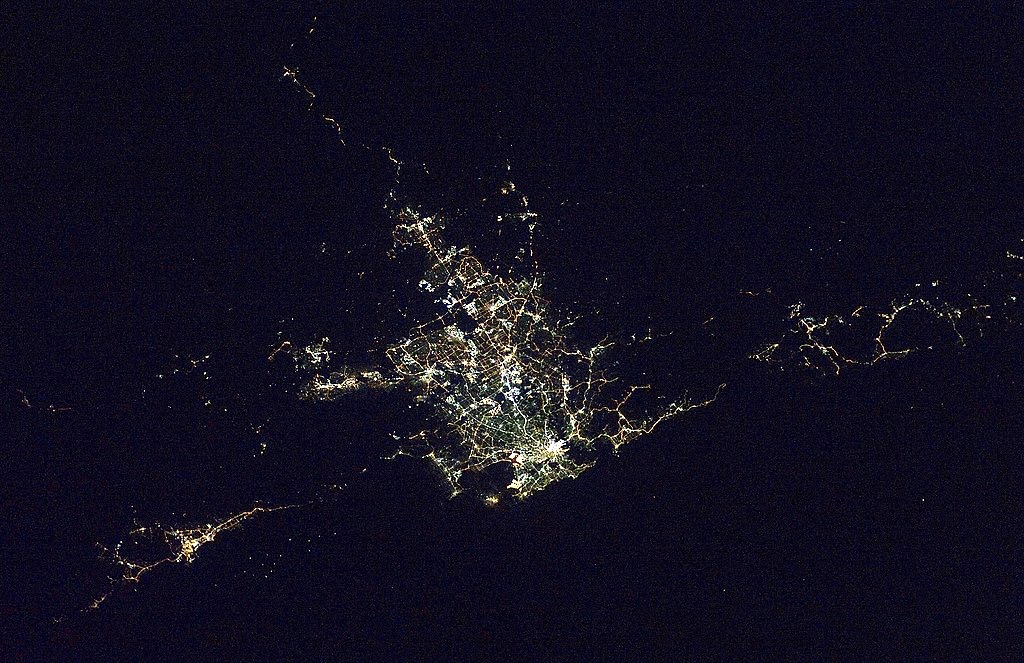
Satellite photo of the Sydney (centre) area at night, facing west by northwest. Regional NSW areas can be seen on this map such as Wollongong in the Illawarra region can be seen at the bottom left, Bowral and Moss Vale in the Southern Highlands region can be seen in the far left, as well as Gosford in the Central Coast region is visible at the far right.

The metropolis of Greater Sydney in New South Wales, Australia, is informally subdivided into a number of geographic regions. The geographical definition of Greater Sydney spans across 33 local government areas and includes the Blue Mountains in the west, the Northern Beaches and the Hawkesbury in the north, the Royal National Park, the Wollondilly and Macarthur in the south, and Botany Bay in the east. These areas sometimes, but not always, roughly coincide with official boundaries of suburbs, local government authorities, or cadastral units (used for land title purposes), and some of the customary regions do not have well defined boundaries at all. Some commonly referred to regions overlap: for example, Canterbury-Bankstown is often referred to as a region, but it is also part of the South Western Sydney region. The regions themselves are not used as a formal jurisdiction, and generally do not have administrative or legislative bodies, although some regions are coterminous with a local government area, and in a number of regions that include multiple local government areas, Regional Organisations of Councils have been established that represent the councils in the region.

For government planning purposes, the metropolis of Sydney is divided in other ways, including into "districts" or "cities".

== History ==
Described as the City of Suburbs, the "regions" of Sydney acquired their distinct social-geographical characteristics as a result of successive waves of development and suburbanisation, as well as geography.

Prior to European arrival, Sydney was inhabited by a number of clans of Aboriginal people. The country inhabited by each clan is often defined by natural geographical features. As a result, there is often a degree of correlation between the traditional country of the Aboriginal custodians and the geographical regions. These include the Gadi of the Cadigal people, encompassing the City and the Eastern Suburbs; the Wanne of the Wangal people, encompassing Inner West; the Wallumetta of the Wallumettagal people, encompassing the Ryde and Hunters Hill areas of Northern Sydney; the Cammeray of the Cammeraygal people and the Gorual of the Gorualgal people, both in the Lower North Shore; and the Burramatta of the Burramattagal people, in Western Sydney.

The "City" region is the site of the earliest urban settlement after European arrival in 1788. Until the building of the Sydney Harbour Bridge, development north of Sydney Harbour was constrained by geography, and most suburban development occurred in the areas immediately to the east and west of the City - the "Eastern Suburbs" and "Inner West" regions respectively. In the late 19th century, certain parts of those two regions were recognised as the premier residential areas of the emerging metropolis. Improved transport links across the Parramatta River began changing this by the end of the 19th century. The 1895 book How to Know Sydney named Strathfield (Inner West), Gladesville (Northern Suburbs), Double Bay, Darling Point, Rose Bay, Elizabeth Bay, Potts Point, Rushcutters Bay and Point Piper (all Eastern Suburbs) as the most fashionable residential suburbs, featuring large houses on extensive grounds. The only suburb in this list which lay north of the river was Gladesville, which was serviced by a bridge across the Parramatta River built in 1881. The building of the Sydney Harbour Bridge led to rapid development of the Lower North Shore region, and soon after, the Upper North Shore and Northern Beaches, as new developments with large houses on generous lots appealed to residents seeking the "picturesque suburb" lifestyle. Together with the oldest suburbs in the East and Inner West, these regions still contain the most desirable residential areas of Sydney: as of the end of 2021, the 20 most expensive postcode areas in Australia (measured by median house price) were all in metropolitan Sydney, and included nine in the Eastern Suburbs, four on the Northern Beaches, two on the Lower North Shore, three on the Upper North Shore, one (straddling Hunters Hill and Woolwich) in Northern Sydney and one (Strathfield) in the Inner West.

At the same time, the arrival of the suburban railway around the end of the 19th century led to development of existing towns and villages into new urban centres outside the traditional metropolis, such as Parramatta, Bankstown and Liverpool. Increased urbanisation in the interwar years, and infill development after World War II, including projects built as part of the soldier settlement scheme, eventually led to these centres becoming part of the metropolitan conurbation of Sydney. By the 1950s, previously rural areas such as the Sutherland Shire were becoming rapidly suburbanised.

The 1951 County of Cumberland planning scheme attempted to rein in urban sprawl by designating an expansive "green belt", which would have limited further urbanisation beyond the already-urbanised parts of Western Sydney. The planned green belt stretched in a curve around Pennant Hills, Baulkham Hills, Blacktown, Seven Hills and Liverpool before ending on the banks of the Georges River opposite East Hills. A non-contiguous section would then have covered the western Sutherland Shire, roughly bordered by the Georges River in the north and the Woronora River in the east, connecting up existing national parks in the north and south. The plan would have constrained suburbanised "Western Sydney" to a much smaller area than it is now, stretching from Lidcombe in the east to Westmead in the west, centred on the urban centre of Parramatta. However, the need to house an "explosion" in population after the war, together with continued demand for suburban housing, led to the "green belt" being whittled away starting from the 1960s. Although a version of the green belt survives, for example, in the form of the Western Sydney Parklands, today's Greater Western Sydney region is far larger than envisaged in the County of Cumberland plan, stretching contiguously west to Penrith and south beyond Campbelltown.

== City ==
The City is composed of the inner parts of the local government area of the City of Sydney. The core of the region known as City is the Sydney CBD, and this is the City region in the narrow sense. However, City is often also used in a wider sense to include other inner suburbs within the City of Sydney local government area, such as Haymarket, The Rocks and Pyrmont. In this wider sense, the City region roughly corresponds with the four cadastral parishes of St Andrews, St Philip, St James and St Lawrence.

The City of Sydney participates in the Southern Sydney Regional Organisation of Councils (SSROC) along with 11 other councils in the Inner West, Eastern Suburbs, St George and Canterbury-Bankstown regions.

== Eastern suburbs ==
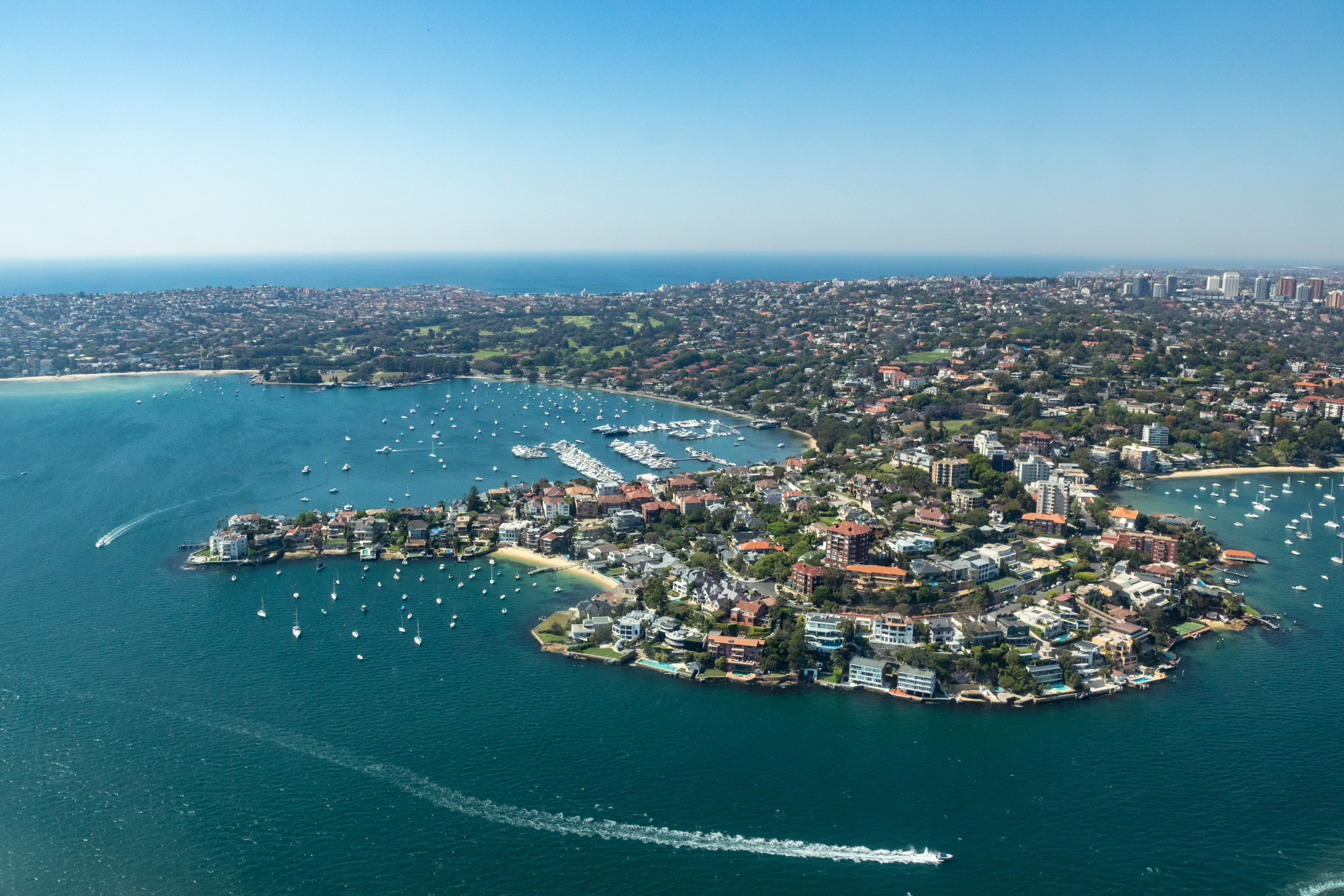
The northern part of the Eastern Suburbs is characterised by headlands and bays facing Sydney Harbour, with low-rise residential buildings.

The suburbs to the east and southeast of the city, bounded by Sydney Harbour to the north, the Pacific Ocean to the east, the Eastern Distributor to the west, and Botany Bay to the south, are often referred to as the Eastern Suburbs in the greater sense. This includes the entirety of the local government areas of Waverley, Woollahra and Randwick as well as the eastern parts of the City of Sydney and Bayside Council.

These five councils participate in the Southern Sydney Regional Organisation of Councils (SSROC) along with seven other councils in the Inner West, St George and Canterbury-Bankstown regions.

=== Eastern Suburbs - North ===
The northern end of the Eastern Suburbs is centred on Waverley Council and Woollahra Council districts as well as The Centennial Parklands which are directly east of the CBD. This area roughly corresponds with the cadastral Parish of Alexandria as well as the Federal Division of Wentworth.

=== Eastern Suburbs - South ===
The southern end of the Eastern Suburbs are the suburbs south-east of The CBD including the entirety of City of Randwick and sometimes the suburbs of Bayside Council which are to the east of the Eastern Distributor, as well as the University of New South Wales. The region roughly corresponds with the cadastral Parish of Botany as well as the Federal Division of Kingsford Smith.

=== Inner East ===
The inner east refers to the suburbs directly surrounding the eastern and south-eastern borders of Sydney CBD within the City of Sydney. This is because they can be considered both inner city and Eastern Suburbs.

== Western suburbs ==
The Western suburbs of Sydney is a large region, starting from the western boundary of the city centre and stretching some 60 kilometres to the west to the foothills of the Blue Mountains. This large area is conventionally divided into a number of regions (some of which overlap).

=== Inner West ===
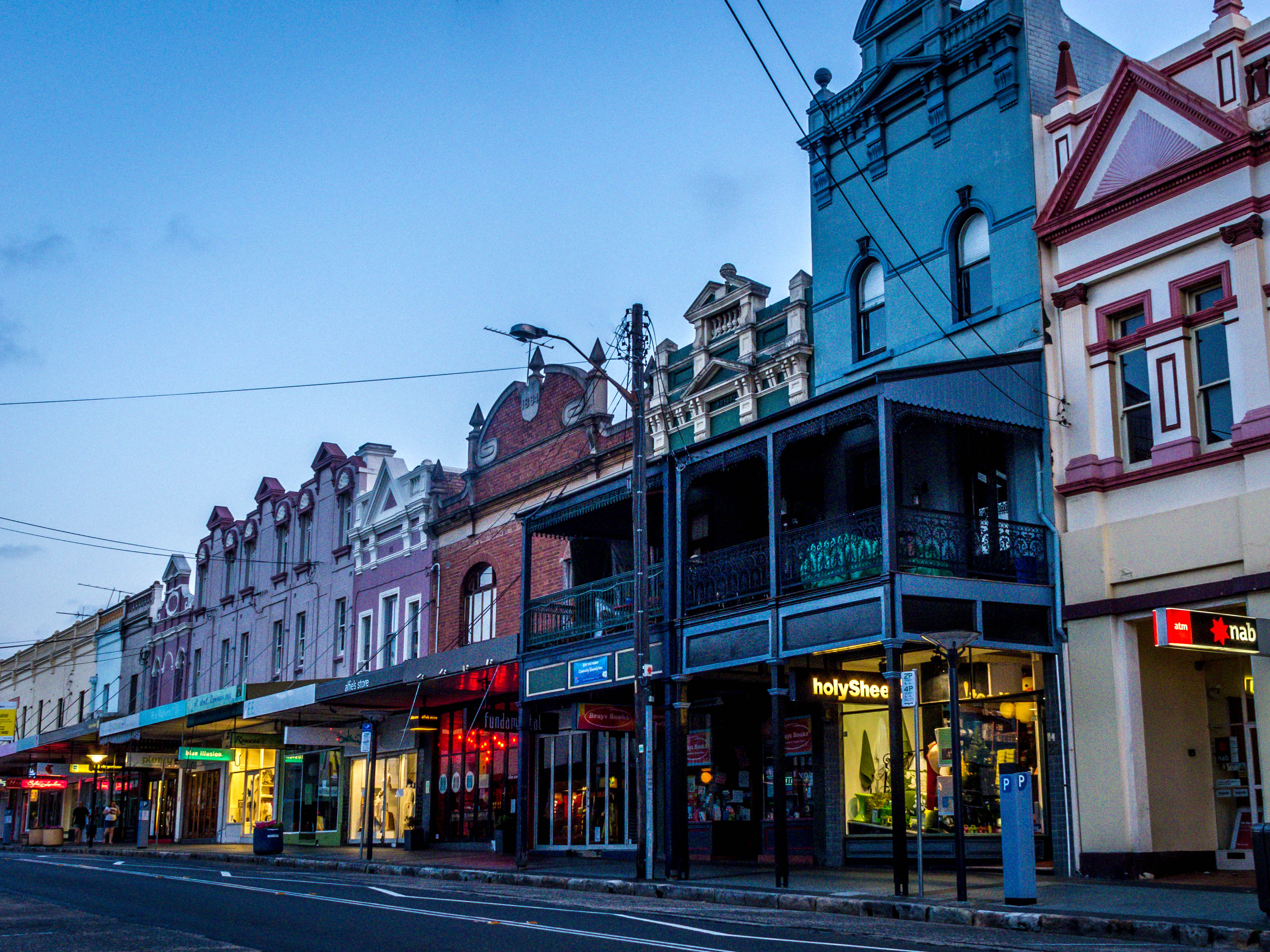
The Inner West is characterised by eclectic village centres and leafy residential districts.

The Inner West is primarily composed of the Inner West Council, Burwood Council, Municipality of Strathfield, and the City of Canada Bay local government areas. It may also be regarded as including small parts of nearby local government areas such as the northeastern part of the City of Canterbury-Bankstown (such as the suburb of Ashbury) and the western part of the City of Sydney (such as the suburb of Glebe). The region is approximately bounded by the Parramatta River in the north, Cooks River in the south, and in the west by the A3 arterial road (Centenary Drive / Homebush Bay Drive) and parklands adjacent to that road.

These six councils participate in the Southern Sydney Regional Organisation of Councils (SSROC) along with six other councils in the Eastern Suburbs and St George regions.

Suburbs usually regarded as being in the Inner West region include Abbotsford, Ashbury, Ashfield, Balmain, Burwood, Concord, Dulwich Hill, Five Dock, Glebe, Homebush, Hurlstone Park, Leichhardt, Lilyfield, Marrickville, Newtown, Rozelle, Strathfield and Summer Hill. The Inner West roughly corresponds to the two cadastral parishes of Petersham (in the east) and Concord (in the west).

=== (Greater) Western Sydney ===
Western Sydney is generally regarded as the local government areas within metropolitan Sydney west of the Inner West. The region of Canterbury-Bankstown may or may not be regarded as part of Western Sydney, depending on context. Some councils of these local government areas participate in the Western Sydney Regional Organisation of Councils, whose members are: the City of Blacktown, City of Blue Mountains, Cumberland Council, City of Hawkesbury, City of Lithgow and City of Liverpool. Fairfield, Parramatta, Canterbury-Bankstown, City of Hawkesbury, the Hills Shire and Penrith are no longer WSROC members, although these local government areas are still regarded as part of Greater Western Sydney.

The primary regional centre of Western Sydney is Parramatta. Some suburbs across different local government areas in this region include Granville, Doonside, Cabramatta, Windsor, Wentworthville, Glenorie, Westmead, St Marys, Kellyville and Edmondson Park.

=== Canterbury-Bankstown ===
The Canterbury-Bankstown region is centered on the City of Canterbury-Bankstown local government area but is not coextensive with it. It is generally regarded as the area bounded approximately by the Cooks River to the north and east, Wolli Creek to the south, and Salt Pan Creek and Duck River to the west. It covers the suburbs extending north-west from southern Canterbury, to the south of Lidcombe and north-east from Bankstown. The part of the City of Canterbury-Bankstown that lies north of the Cooks River is generally regarded as part of the Inner West region. The Canterbury-Bankstown region is a subset of South Western Sydney and Greater Western Sydney, and sometimes with some overlap with the Inner West region.

The primary centre of Canterbury-Bankstown is Bankstown.

The City of Canterbury-Bankstown participates in the Southern Sydney Regional Organisation of Councils (SSROC) along with ten other councils in the Inner West, City, Eastern Suburbs and St George regions.

=== Inner South West ===
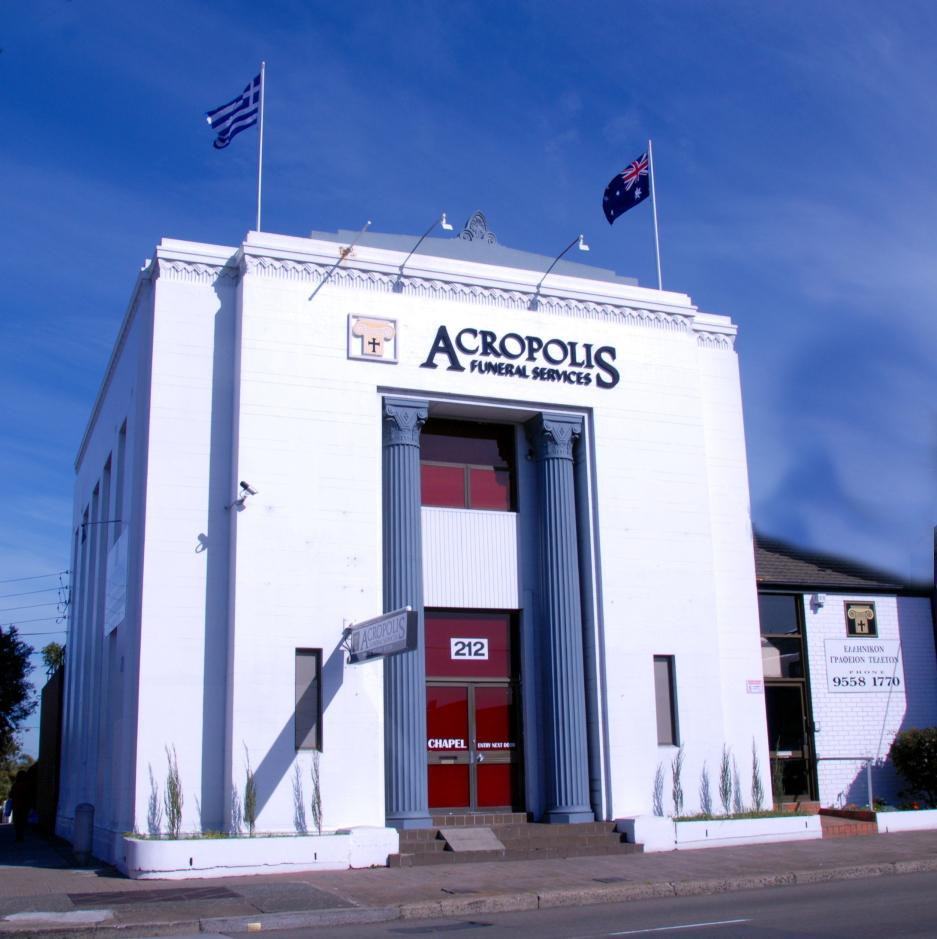
The Inner South West includes a number of suburbs with a cosmopolitan character.

The "Inner South West" is a region name used mostly in administrative and statistical contexts. It is based on the Australian Bureau of Statistics statistical area of the same name. It covers both the Parish of St George (which covers the whole of this region except for the former City of Bankstown area), and the Parish of Bankstown. It therefore includes the local government area of Georges River Council (in the southeast), the western part of Bayside Council (formerly the City of Rockdale) in the northeast, and, in the north and west, the City of Canterbury-Bankstown excluding its northernmost parts. It is therefore the combination of the Canterbury-Bankstown region and the St George region, and includes the former City of Canterbury, which (depending on context) may be included in either of those regions. The term is frequently used in media reporting about the real estate market.

=== Hills District ===
Suburbs in the Hills District are generally located within The Hills Shire local government area and parts of the City of Parramatta Council and Hornsby Shire are also included in the area. Suburbs include Castle Hill, West Pennant Hills, Glenhaven, Kenthurst, Annangrove, Dural, Beaumont Hills Kellyville, Baulkham Hills, Rouse Hill and Box Hill

=== Macarthur ===
The Macarthur region is located to the outer south-west of Sydney that includes the City of Campbelltown and Camden Council. The Wollondilly Shire is occasionally informally included in the Macarthur region.

=== South Western Sydney ===
South Western Sydney is a customary region that includes the south-western part of metropolitan Sydney. When used in the narrow sense, "South Western Sydney" refers to the southern portion of Western Sydney, roughly including Liverpool, Campbelltown, Fairfield and some parts of the Canterbury-Bankstown local government areas.

The boundaries of this region are often imprecise, as it is sometimes also extended further south to include the Camden local government area, and sometimes even the Wollondilly Shire, in which usage the whole of the Macarthur region is included.

South Western Sydney, or "Sydney's southwest" as the media often calls it, is a subset of Greater Western Sydney.

== Northern suburbs ==
The part of Sydney north of Sydney Harbour and the Parramatta River is generally referred to as the Northern suburbs or Northern Sydney.

The Northern Suburbs includes suburbs in the local government areas of Hornsby Shire, City of Ryde, City of Willoughby, North Sydney Council, Municipality of Mosman, Municipality of Lane Cove, Northern Beaches Council, Ku-ring-gai Council, Municipality of Hunters Hill and the eastern parts of the City of Parramatta Council. Suburbs include Epping, Chatswood, Dee Why, Ryde and Manly.

The Northern Sydney Regional Organisation of Councils represents the northern Sydney councils, other than Northern Beaches council.

=== Northern Beaches ===
The Northern Beaches generally correlates with the Northern Beaches Council local government area. Major suburbs include Manly, Dee Why, Mona Vale and Narrabeen.

=== Forest district ===
Sydney's Forest district is located within the Northern Beaches Council local government area and is generally regarded as part of the larger Northern Beaches region. Suburbs include Frenchs Forest, Terrey Hills and Belrose.

=== Northern Districts ===
The Northern Districts is a historical and community designation used for parts of northern Sydney, particularly the area around Ryde, Eastwood and Epping. The National Parks Association of NSW identifies Northern Districts separately from the North Shore and Hills District, although the region has no formally prescribed geographical boundaries.

The central Ryde district occupies much of the land north of the Parramatta River and west of the Lane Cove River. Its suburban centres include Ryde, West Ryde, Eastwood, Epping, North Ryde, Macquarie Park, Marsfield and Meadowbank. Historical sporting and community associations have also connected the area with suburbs further north, including Pennant Hills, Thornleigh and Normanhurst, which have overlapping associations with the Hornsby district and Upper North Shore.

The area's colonial geography was associated with the Field of Mars, a name applied to land grants beginning in 1792. The Field of Mars Common, established in 1804, comprised approximately 5,050 acres (2,044 hectares), extending along the southern side of the Lane Cove River towards Pennant Hills. The historical Parish of Field of Mars included Epping, whose railway station originally opened as Field of Mars in 1886. Historical parish maps, including a 1910 edition, are preserved by the State Library of New South Wales.

=== Lower North Shore ===
The Lower North Shore usually refers to the land that is located to the north of the Sydney Harbour Bridge, between Lane Cove River and Middle Harbour and as far north as Boundary Street, Roseville, or all suburbs within the local government areas of Mosman Council, City of Willoughby, Municipality of Lane Cove and North Sydney Council. Suburbs include Neutral Bay, Northbridge, Lane Cove and Chatswood. The Hunter's Hill peninsula (mostly in the Municipality of Hunter's Hill, and some suburbs of City of Ryde) lies west of the Lane Cove River, but is sometimes also counted as part of the Lower North Shore.

=== Upper North Shore ===
The Upper North Shore usually refers to all suburbs within the local government area of Ku-ring-gai, and a small area of Hornsby Shire, situated between Lane Cove National Park and Ku-ring-gai National Park, or suburbs between Boundary Street, Roseville, the M1 Motorway in Wahroonga and up to Westleigh on Pennant Hills road. Suburbs include Lindfield, St Ives and Pymble, Thornleigh, Westleigh, Normanhurst, Wahroonga, Turramurra and Gordon.

== Southern suburbs ==
The suburbs approximately to the south and south-west of Sydney CBD and the Sydney Airport are generally referred to as the southern suburbs or Southern Sydney.

Southern Sydney is composed of the City of Sydney (part), Bayside Council, Georges River Council and the Sutherland Shire local government areas.

These four councils participates in the Southern Sydney Regional Organisation of Councils (SSROC) along with eight other councils in the Inner West, City, Eastern Suburbs and Canterbury-Bankstown regions.

=== Inner South ===
The Inner Southern Suburbs of Sydney sometimes referred to as 'South Sydney' include the southern suburbs of City of Sydney as well as some of Bayside Council. The area encompasses the suburbs directly south of Central station or more specifically Cleveland Street leading all the way down to Sydney Airport and fall west of the Eastern Distributor but east of Alexandra Canal. The area starts with Redfern then continues down through Eveleigh, Waterloo, Zetland, Alexandria, Beaconsfield, Rosebery, Eastlakes (West of ED) and ends in Mascot.

The postcodes start at 2015 and end in 2020 with the suburbs of Botany and Banksmeadow being the exception having the postcode of 2019 which while being geographically south of the CBD along with the included suburbs are actually past Sydney Airport and on the other side of the Eastern Distributor deeming them South-East and not Inner South.

The region consists of three train stations being Redfern, Green Square and Mascot as well as a Metro station in Waterloo. Green Square is a locality situated at the meeting point of Alexandria, Zetland, Waterloo, and Beaconsfield. Green Square and Mascot station are on the Airport Link completed in 2000 which is part of the T8 Airport & South Line. Many of these suburbs were predominantly industrial and commercial but have now developed into new residential neighbourhoods of high rise apartments.

The Inner Southern Suburbs are often considered an indefinite region of Sydney as it is sometimes considered Inner city or included as part of the Eastern Suburbs or more specifically South-East however strictly speaking these suburbs geographically are neither east nor south-east of the Sydney CBD.

=== St George ===
The St George area includes all the suburbs in the Georges River Council and part of the Bayside Council government areas. This area corresponds to the eastern part of the cadastral Parish of St George, from which the region derives its name. The western part of the Parish of St George was formerly in the City of Canterbury and now within Canterbury-Bankstown council.

=== Sutherland Shire ===
The Shire generally correlates with the Sutherland Shire local government area.

== Blue Mountains ==
The region is mainly composed of the City of Blue Mountains, which borders on Sydney's metropolitan area, its foothills starting about 50 kilometres (31 mi) west of the state capital. Major towns in this local government area include Katoomba, Blackheath and Springwood.

== Greater Sydney Commission subdivisions ==
The Greater Sydney Commission's regional plan for Sydney divide the metropolis into three "cities", with approximately defined boundaries. Alternatively, the metropolis is divided into more precisely defined "districts", each of which comprises multiple local government areas. This scheme of division is also followed for metropolis-wide planning purposes by other New South Wales government bodies, such as in the government's "Future Transport Strategy".

=== The three cities ===
The "metropolis of three cities" comprises:

- Eastern Harbour City: approximately including the City, the Inner West, the Eastern Suburbs, the North Shore, the Northern Beaches, St George and Sutherland. The NSW government sometimes, but does not always, place Canterbury-Bankstown in this City. The Sydney CBD is the centre of this city.
- Central River City: approximately including the Greater Western Sydney suburbs bounded by Hornsby, Rouse Hill, Blacktown, Fairfield, Bankstown and Sydney Olympic Park. The NSW government sometimes, but does not always, place Canterbury-Bankstown in this City. Parramatta is the centre of this city.
- Western Parkland City: approximately including the remainder of Greater Western Sydney, to the west of the Central River City. This expansive city has multiple centres, including Penrith, Liverpool, Campbelltown-Macarthur and the future Western Sydney Airport Aerotropolis.

=== The districts ===
The more precisely defined "districts" are the following:

- Central City District: including the northwestern local government areas of Blacktown, Cumberland, Parramatta and the Hills Shire.
- Eastern City District: including the eastern, central and inner western local government areas of Bayside, Burwood, Canada Bay, City of Sydney, Inner West, Randwick, Strathfield, Waverley and Woollahra.
- North District: including the northeastern local government areas of Hornsby, Hunter's Hill, Ku-ring-gai, Lane Cove, Mosman, North Sydney, Northern Beaches, Ryde and Willoughby
- South District: including the southern local government areas of Canterbury-Bankstown, Georges River and Sutherland
- Western City District: including the western local government areas of Blue Mountains, Camden, Campbelltown, Fairfield, Hawkesbury, Liverpool, Penrith and Wollondilly.

A district plan has been formulated for each district, and local government authorities are required to align their planning instruments to the priorities listed in the Metropolis of Three Cities (Regional Plan) and the relevant District Plan.
