= Hundred of Sydney =

- Cadastral division
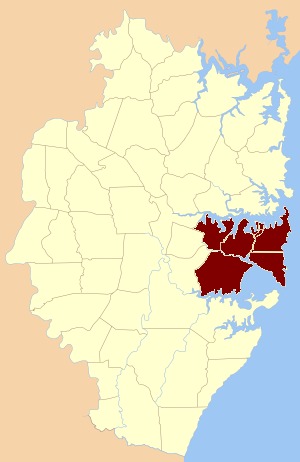
- The nine parishes which were part of the Hundred of Sydney
- Country: Australia
- State: New South Wales
- Established: 1835
- Abolished: 1888
- County: Cumberland
Lands administrative divisions around Hundred of Sydney
Parramatta	Packenham	Pacific Ocean
Parramatta	Hundred of Sydney	Pacific Ocean
Liverpool	Heathcote	Pacific Ocean

The Hundred of Sydney is a former lands administrative division for the city of Sydney and its inner suburbs. It was one of the thirteen hundreds in the County of Cumberland, which were published in the government gazette of May 27, 1835, and repealed on January 21, 1888.

It included nine parishes (more than any other hundred); the four small parishes in the Sydney city area: St Andrew, St James, St Lawrence and St Philip, as well as five larger parishes further away from the city: Concord, Petersham, Alexandria, Botany and St George. Its boundaries were the Parramatta River/Sydney Harbour to the north, Botany Bay/Georges River to the south, while the western boundary included part of Haslams Creek (formerly Hacking Creek) and Salt Pan Creek.

The area occupied by the former Hundred of Sydney corresponds with the customary Sydney regions of the Eastern Suburbs, South-Eastern Sydney, Inner West and St George, as well as the inner city of Sydney.

Administratively, the area roughly corresponds with the modern Local Government Areas of the Municipality of Woollahra, Waverley Council, City of Randwick, City of Sydney, Inner West Council, Municipality of Burwood, Municipality of Strathfield, City of Canada Bay, Bayside Council, Georges River Council and the eastern part of the City of Canterbury-Bankstown (which was formerly City of Canterbury).
