= Parish of Sutherland =

Coordinates: 34°01′54″S 151°05′04″E

Sutherland
- Cadastral division
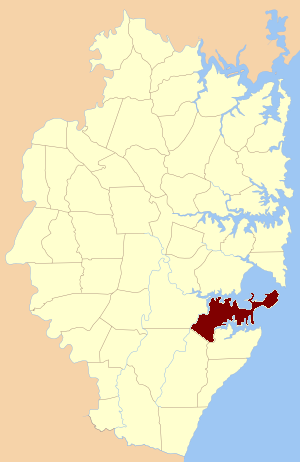
- Location of the parish within Cumberland
- Country: Australia
- State: New South Wales
- LGA: Sutherland Shire
- Established: 1835
- County: Cumberland
- Hundred (former): Heathcote
Lands administrative divisions around Sutherland
St George	St George	Botany
Holsworthy	Sutherland	Pacific Ocean
Heathcote	Wattamolla	Pacific Ocean

The Parish of Sutherland is one of the 57 parishes in Cumberland County, New South Wales, a cadastral unit for use on land titles. It was originally proclaimed as the parish of Southerland with an 'o', but was misspelled without it on the government gazette. It includes all of the Kurnell peninsula, with Botany Bay and the Georges River to the north; part of the Woronora River to the west; and Port Hacking to the south. Suburbs within the parish include Cronulla, Miranda, Woolooware, Caringbah, Gymea, Sutherland, Sylvania Waters and Oyster Bay.
