= Parish of St Andrew =

Coordinates: 33°52′26″S 151°12′23″E

St Andrew
- Cadastral division
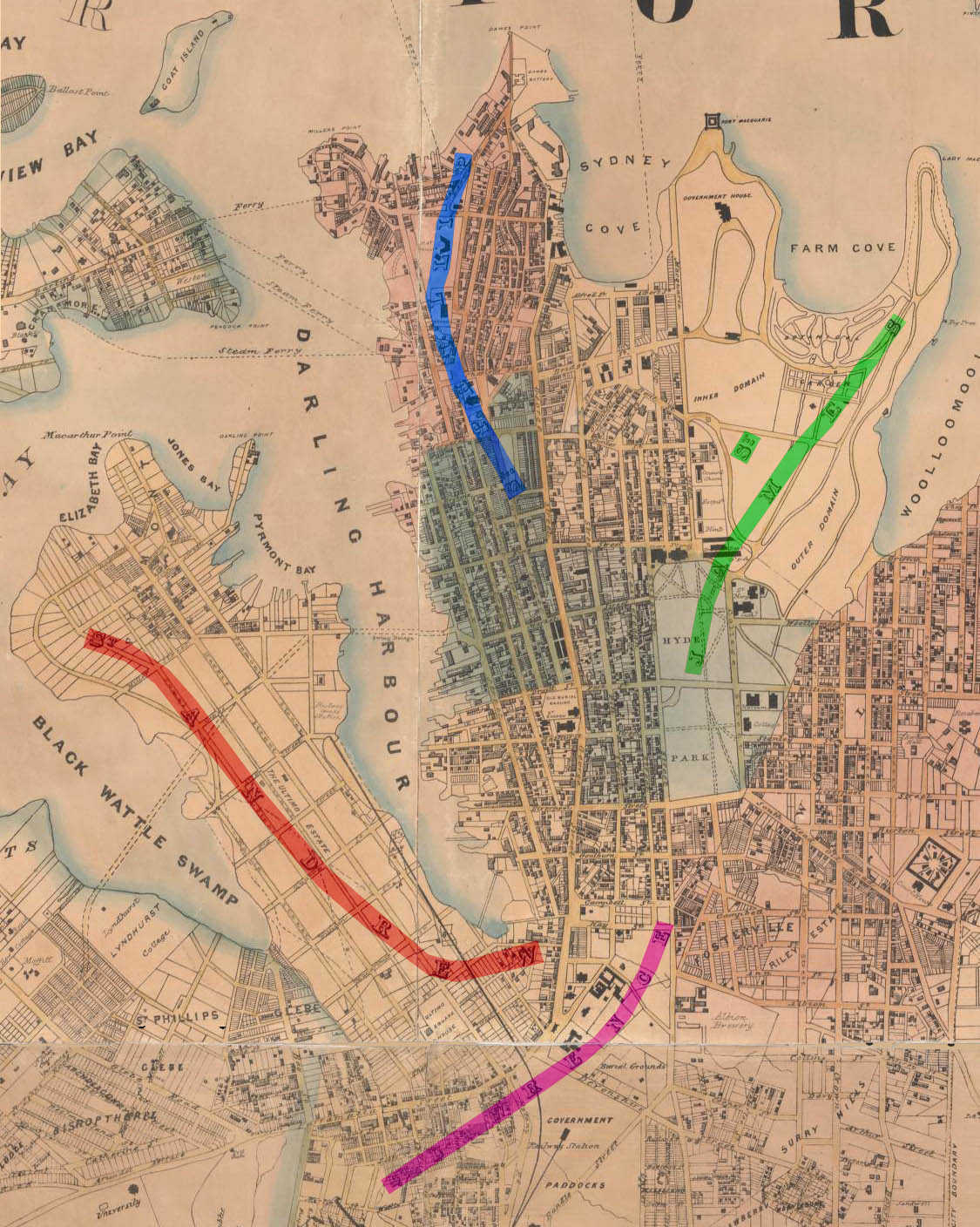
- Location in Sydney city highlighted in red on an 1857 map
- Country: Australia
- State: New South Wales
- LGA: City of Sydney
- Established: 1835
- County: Cumberland
- Hundred (former): Sydney
Lands administrative divisions around St Andrew
Petersham	St Philip	St James
Petersham	St Andrew	St James
Petersham	Alexandria	St Lawrence

St Andrew Parish, Cumberland is one of the 57 parishes of Cumberland County, New South Wales, a cadastral unit for use on land titles. It is one of the four small parishes in the Sydney city area (together with St Philip, St Lawrence and St James), and is named after the church of St Andrew's. The parish was named while the church was still in the planning stages. The parish includes Pyrmont and the Darling Harbour area. It is bounded by Wattle Street in the south west, George Street in the south and east, and King Street in the north-east. It includes Town Hall railway station, which is on the eastern end of the parish.

== Locations ==
Images of locations in the parish:

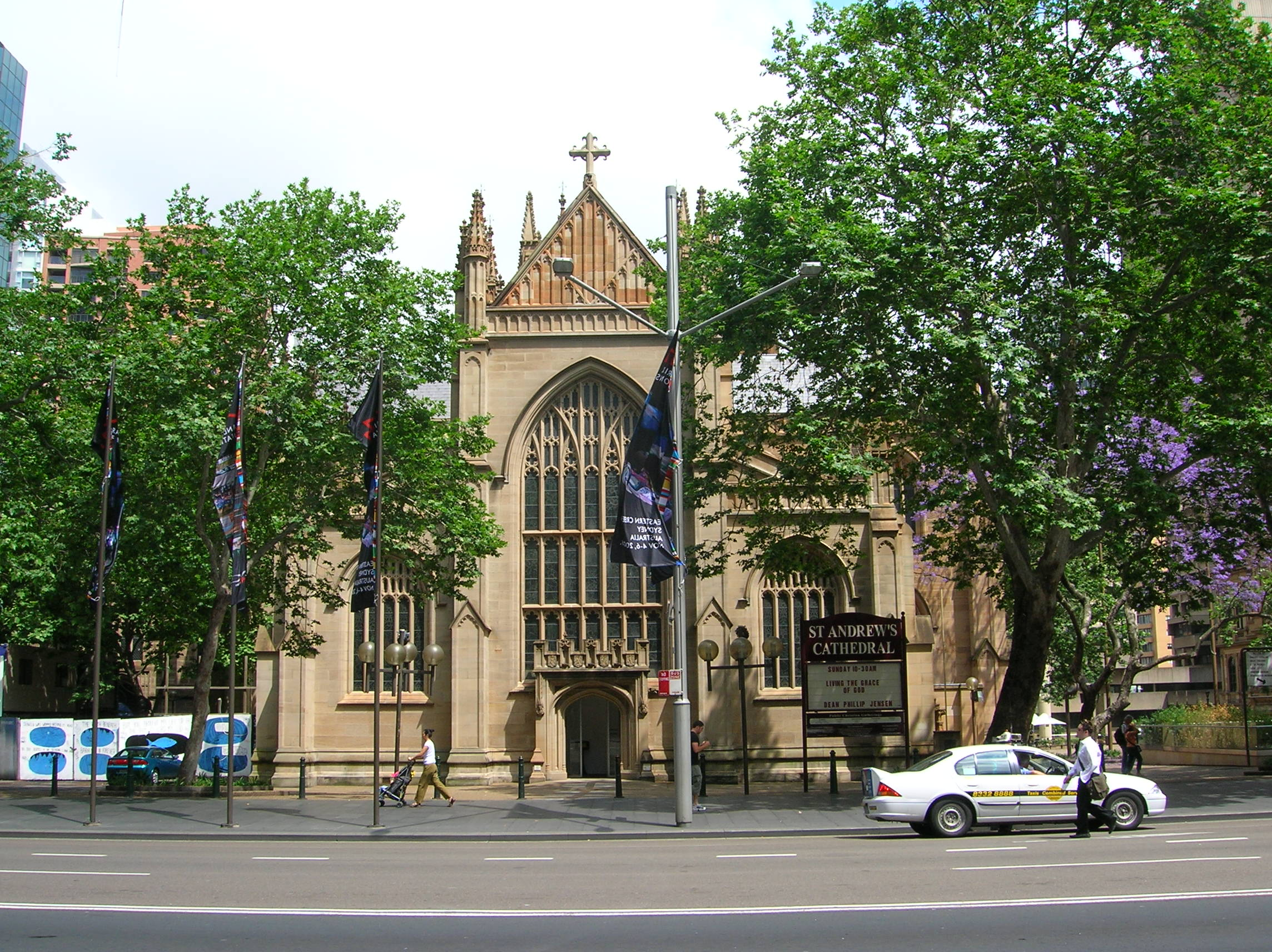
St Andrew's Cathedral

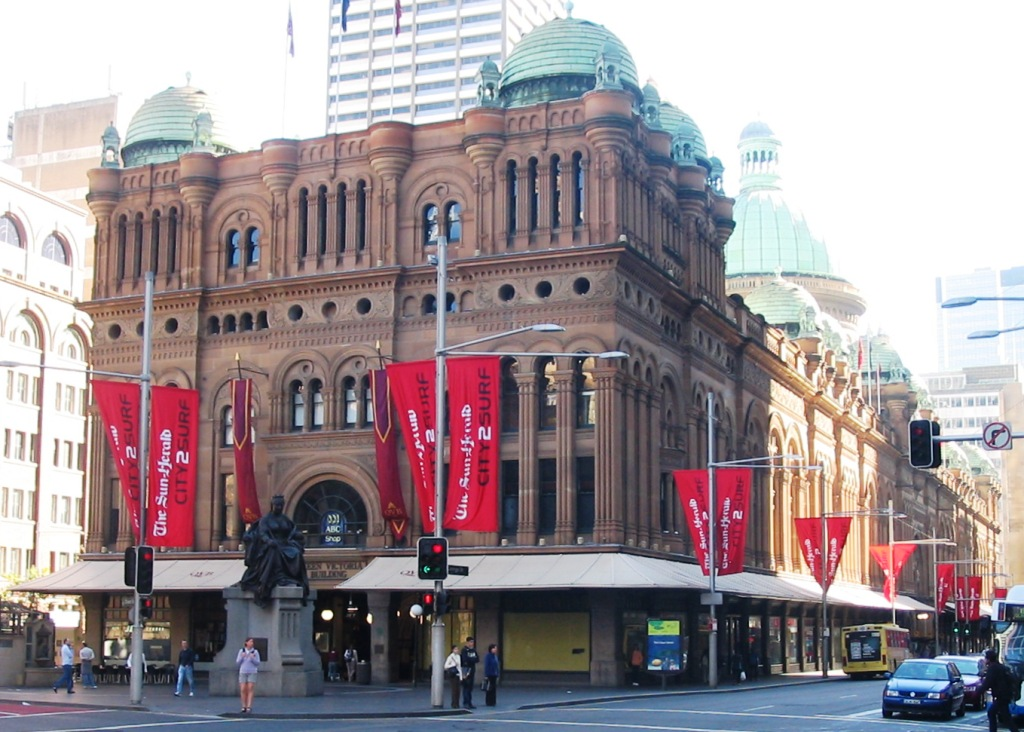
The Queen Victoria Building at the eastern end of the parish

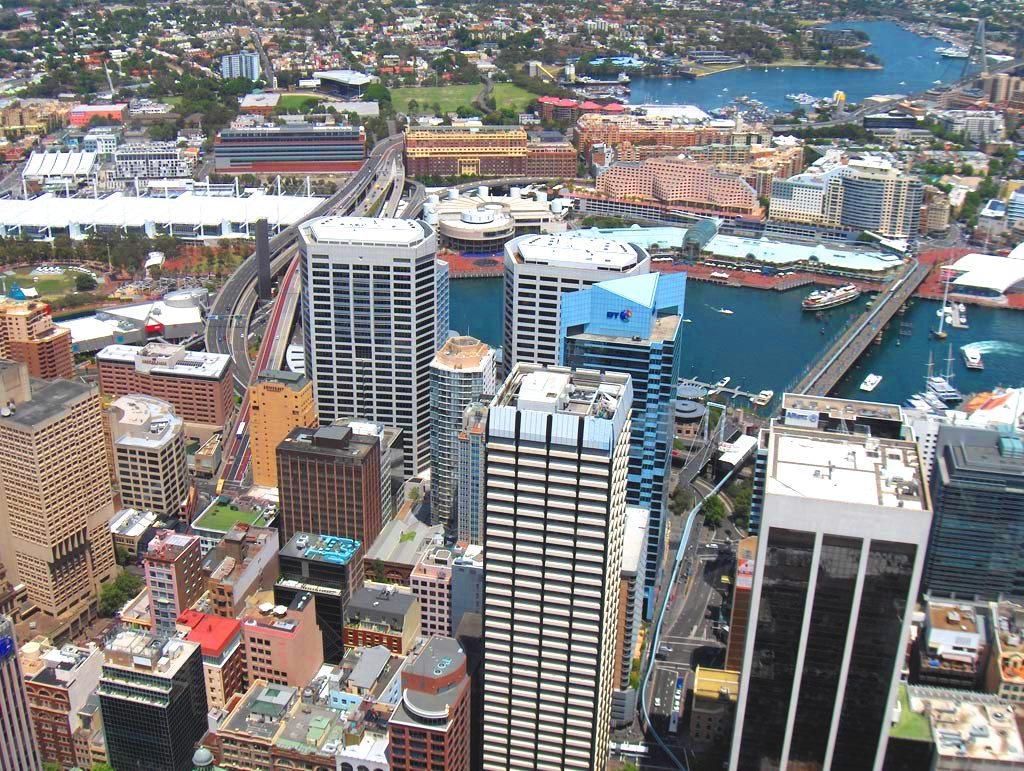
Buildings in the Darling Harbour area; most of this land is in the Parish of St Andrew except for Wentworth Park and the land beyond it.

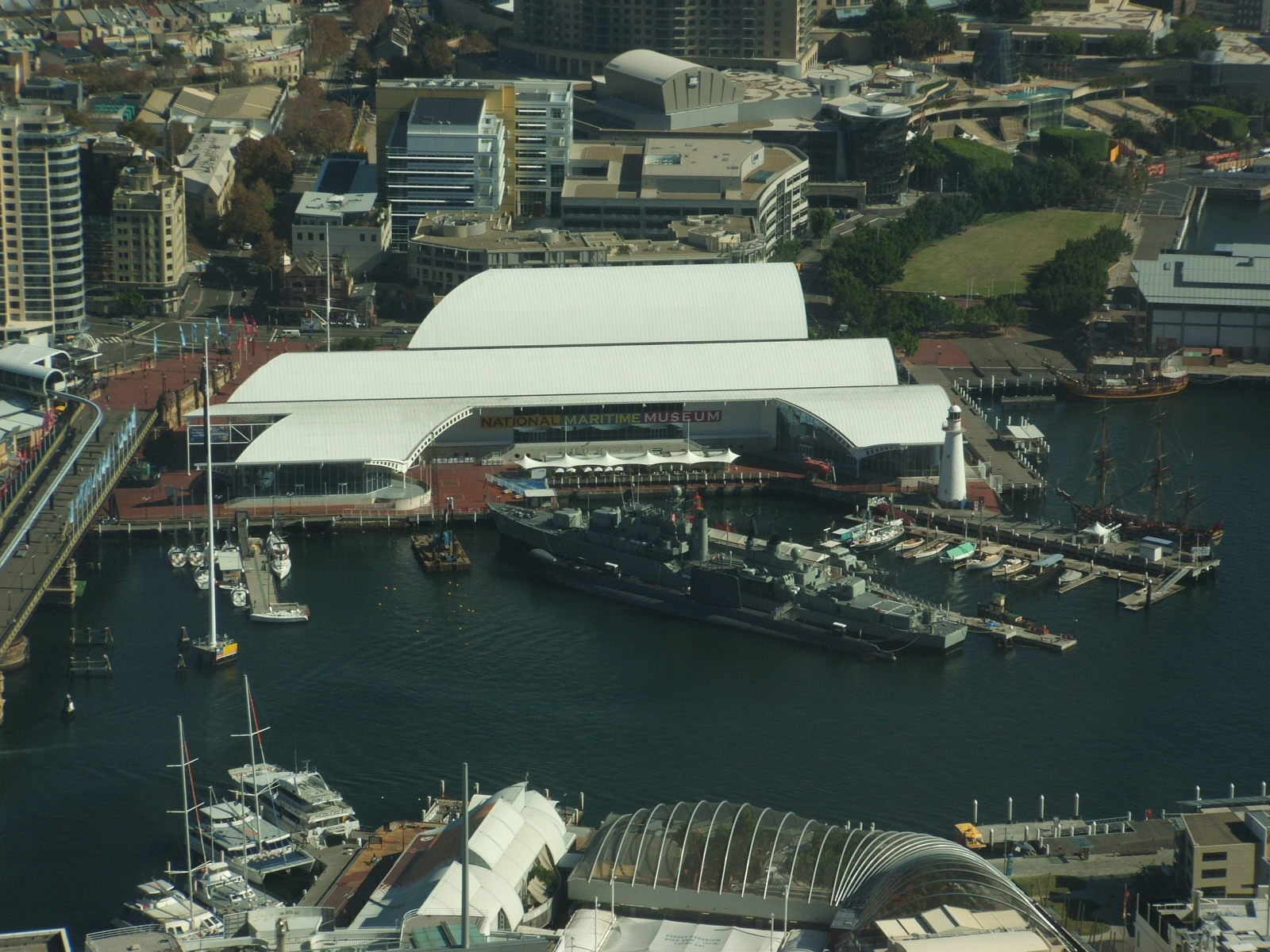
Australian National Maritime Museum

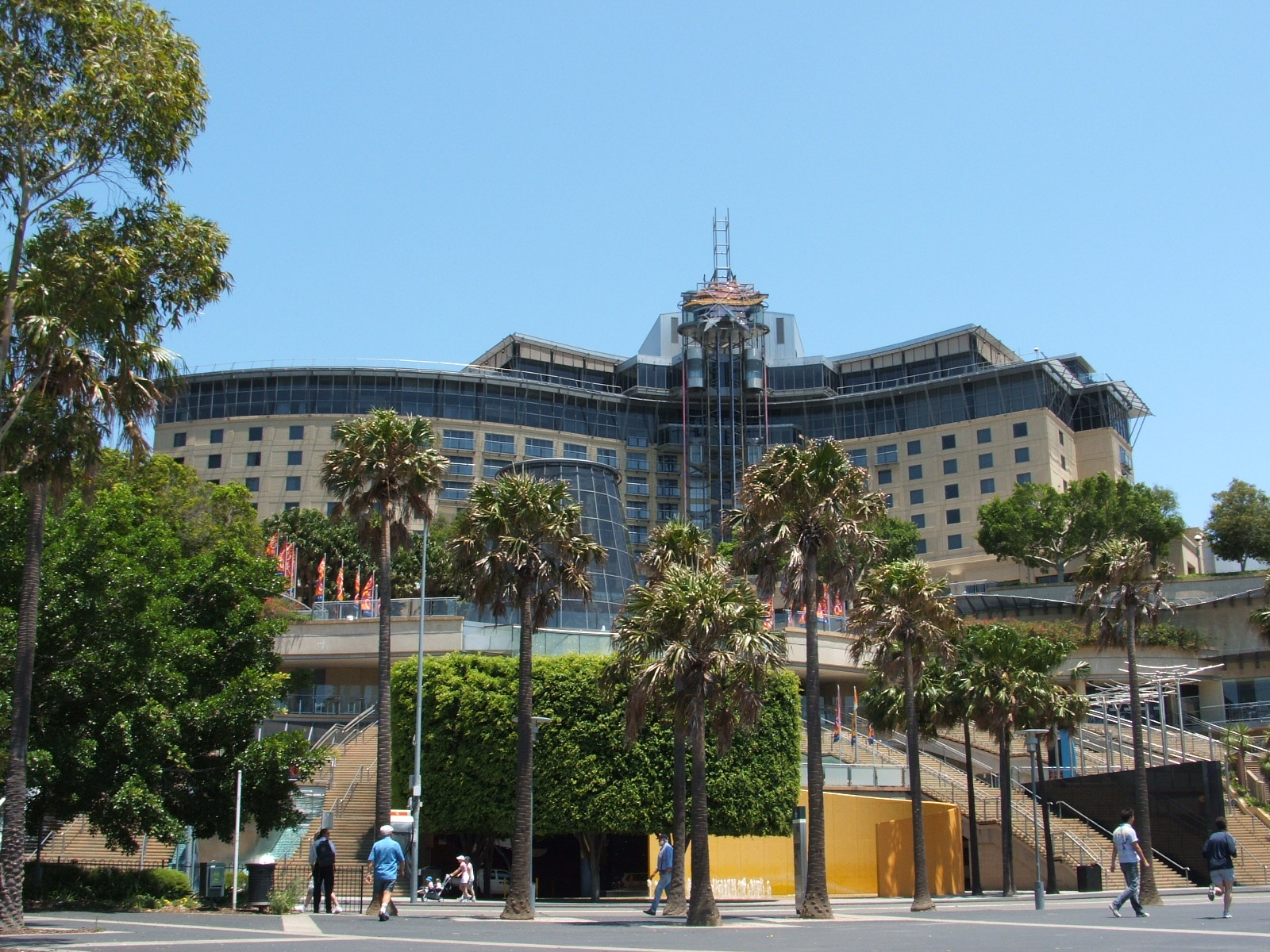
Star City Casino

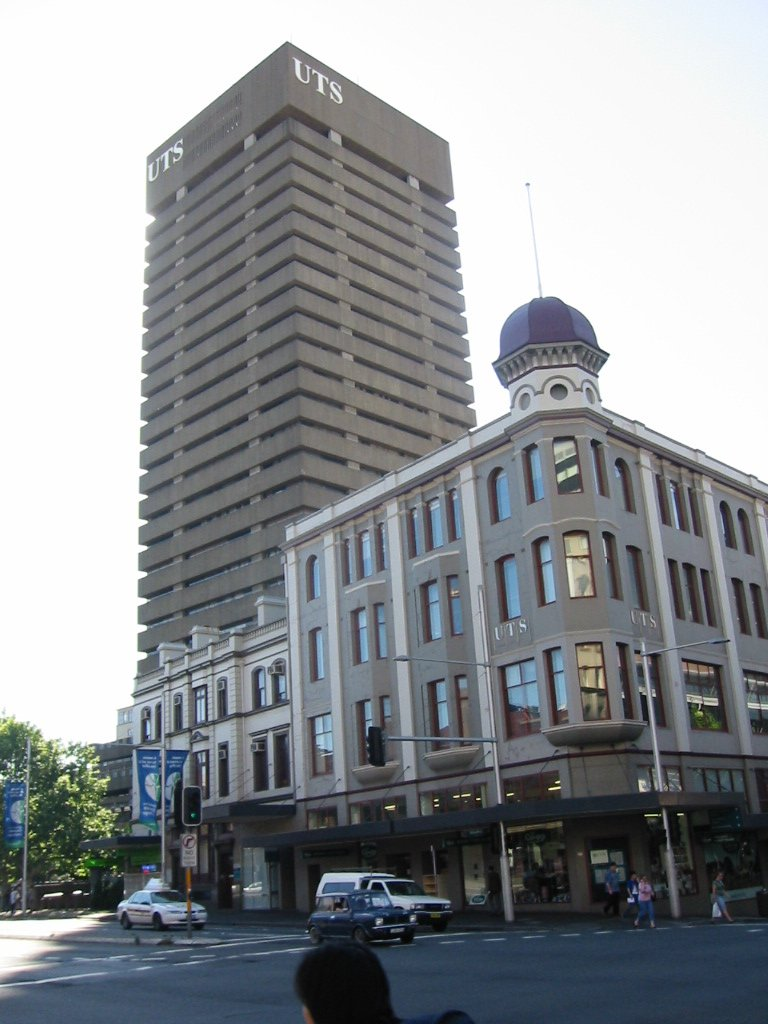
The University of Technology is located on the southern end of the parish.

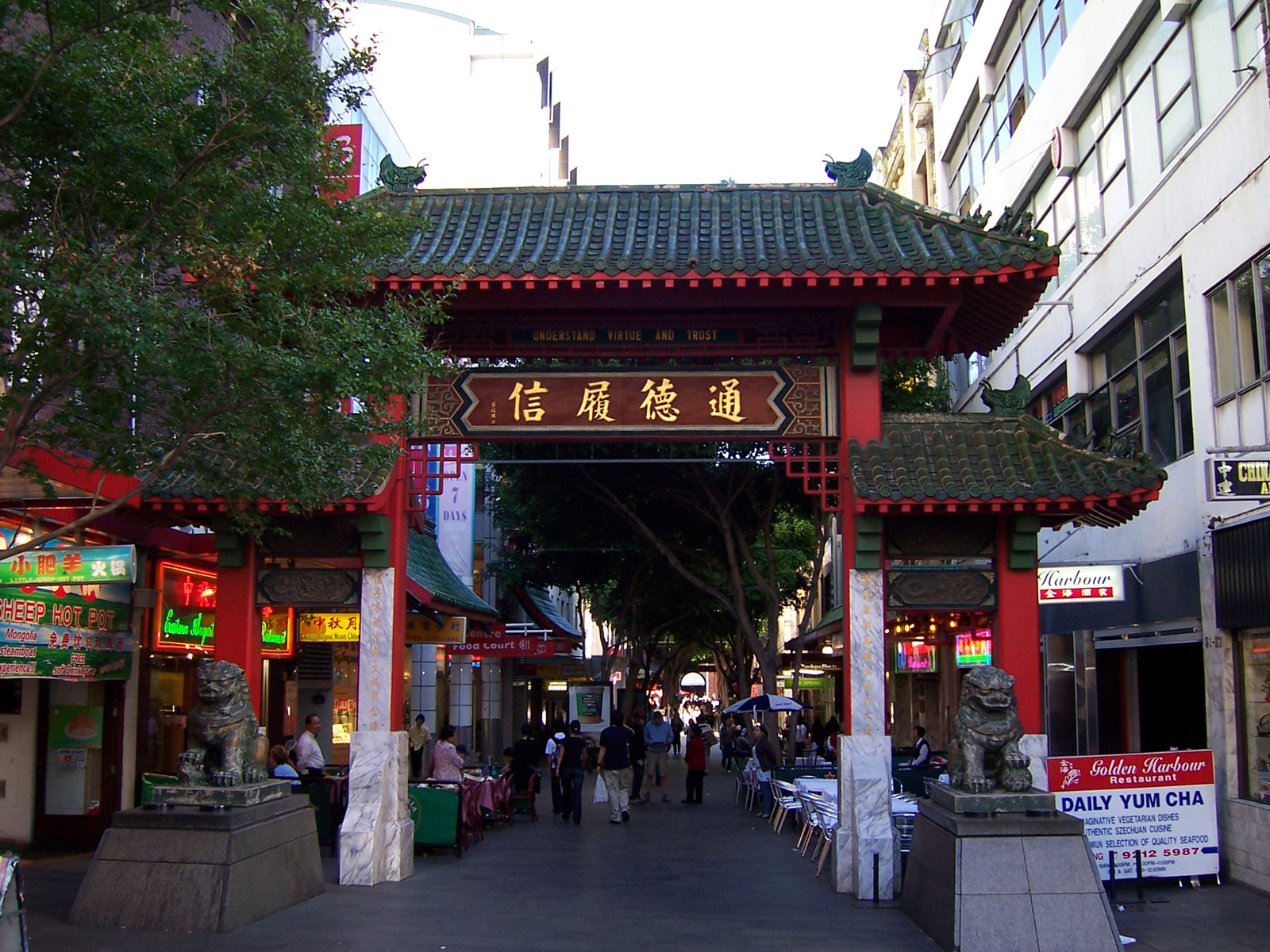
Chinatown

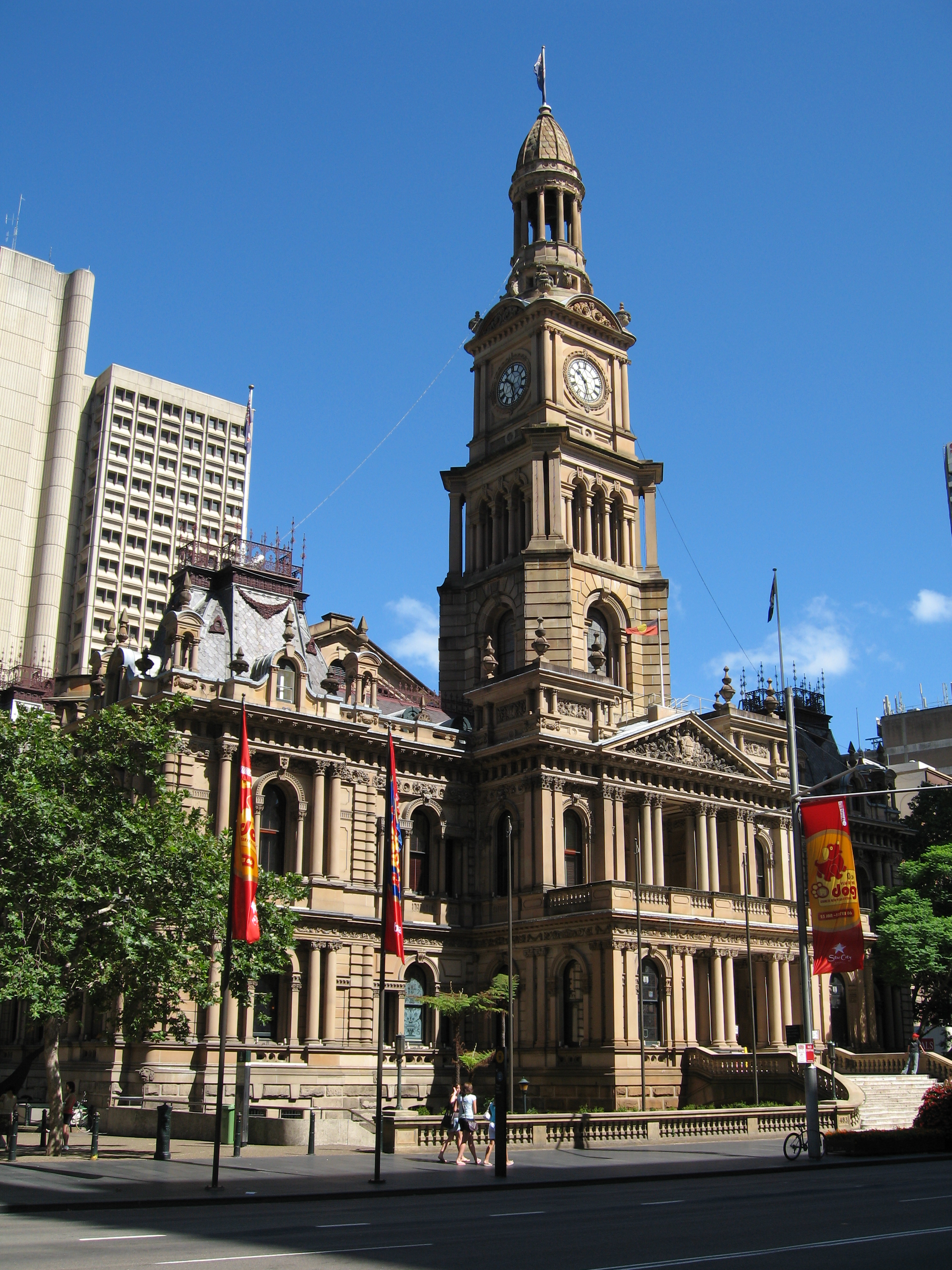
Sydney Town Hall
