= Parish of St James =

Coordinates: 33°52′10″S 151°12′39″E

St James
- Cadastral division
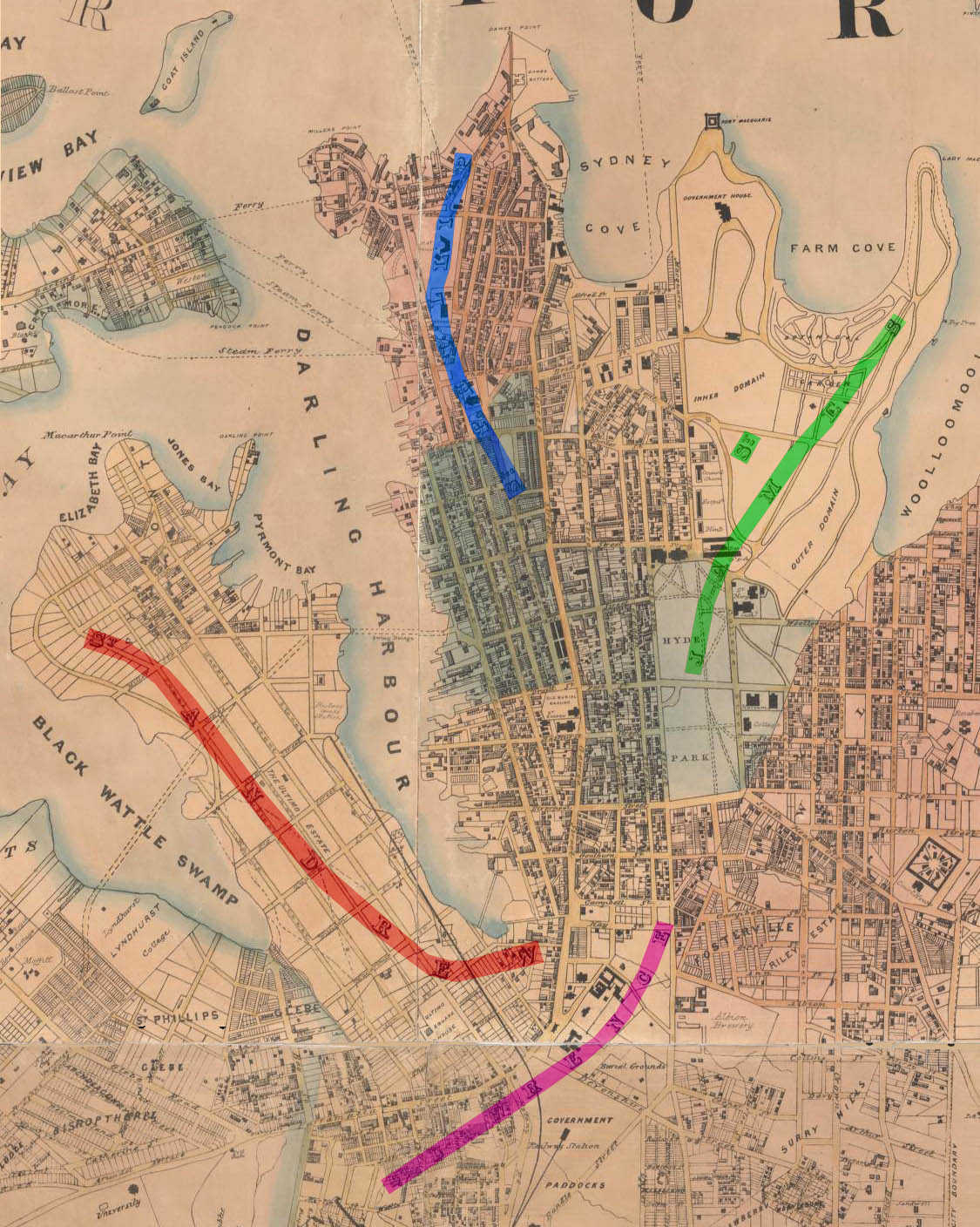
- Location in Sydney city highlighted in green
- Country: Australia
- State: New South Wales
- LGA: City of Sydney
- Established: 1835
- County: Cumberland
- Hundred (former): Sydney
Lands administrative divisions around St James
St Philip	Willoughby	Willoughby
St Philip	St James	Alexandria
St Andrew	St Lawrence	Alexandria

St James Parish, Cumberland is one of the 57 parishes of Cumberland County, New South Wales, a cadastral unit for use on land titles. It is one of the four small parishes in the Sydney city area, which is named after the Anglican church of St James, which was consecrated in 1824. The name St James is also used today for the railway station in the same area.

A record for a marriage, funeral or baptism ceremony held in the 'Parish of St James' refers to this civil parish, not necessarily meaning the Anglican church of St James, and the church notes that this has been the case of some confusion. A marriage held at the catholic St Mary's Cathedral in the 19th century would be recorded as being in the Parish of St James.

== Locations ==
The parish includes a large number of tourist attractions and important buildings in Sydney, including the Sydney Opera House, Sydney Tower, NSW parliament house, Royal Botanic Gardens The Domain, the part of Hyde Park north of Park street, Circular Quay, and Martin Place. The parish is bounded by the area which was originally the Tank Stream (now Pitt Street near Circular Quay), and George Street in the west. It is bounded by Park Street and part of William Street in the south, and Young Crescent and Woolloomooloo Bay in the east.

== Images ==
Images of locations in the Parish of St James:

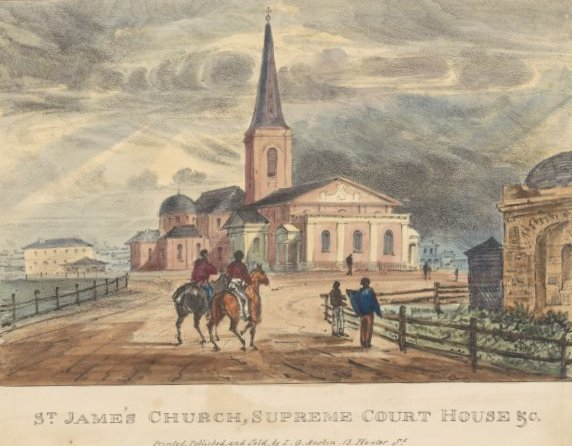
St James Church

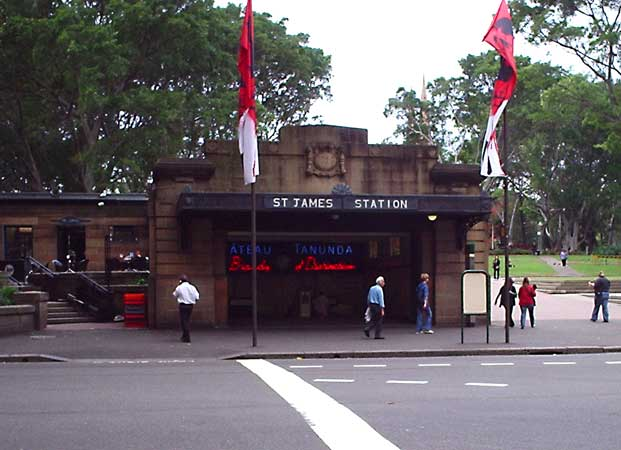
St James station

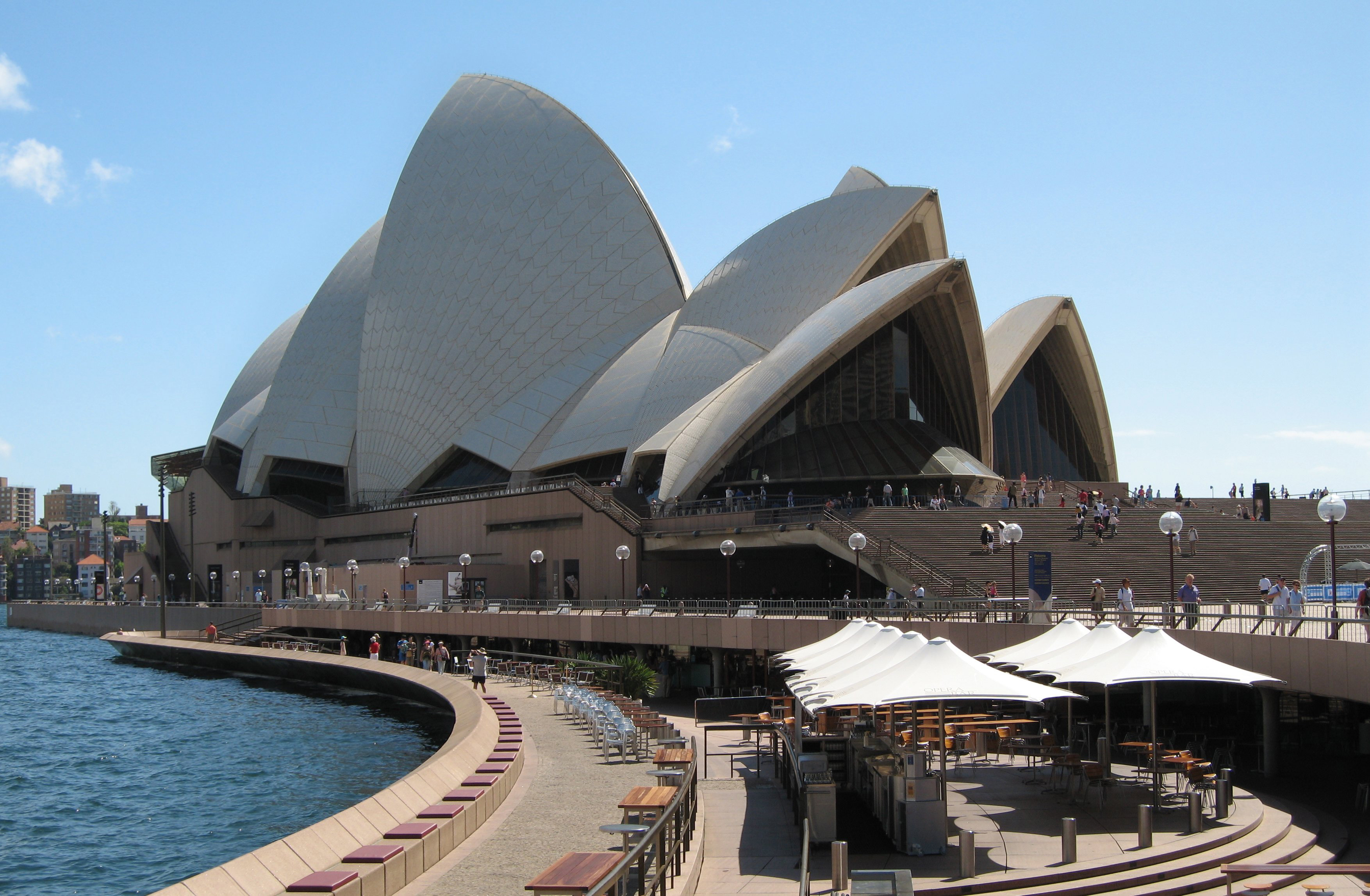
Sydney Opera House

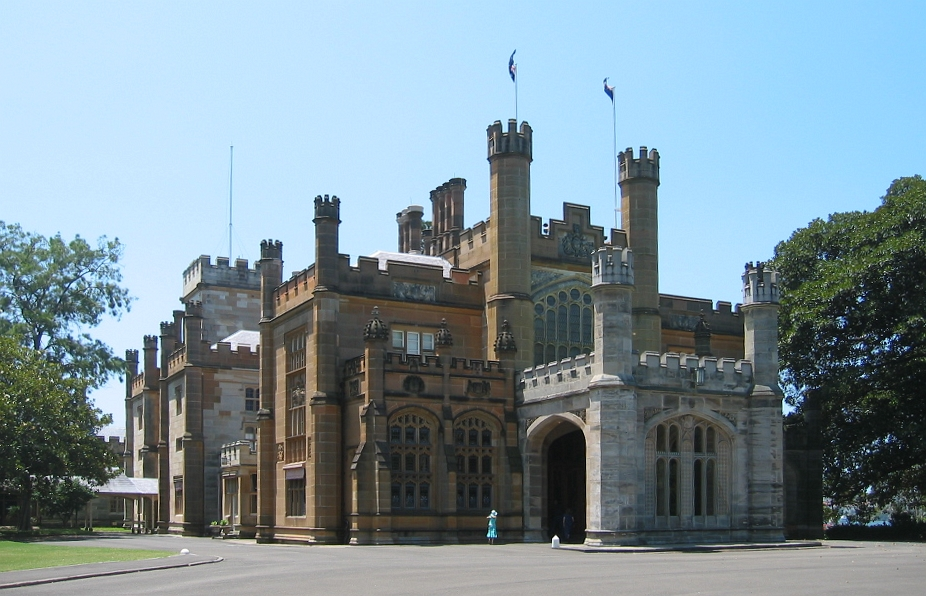
Government House

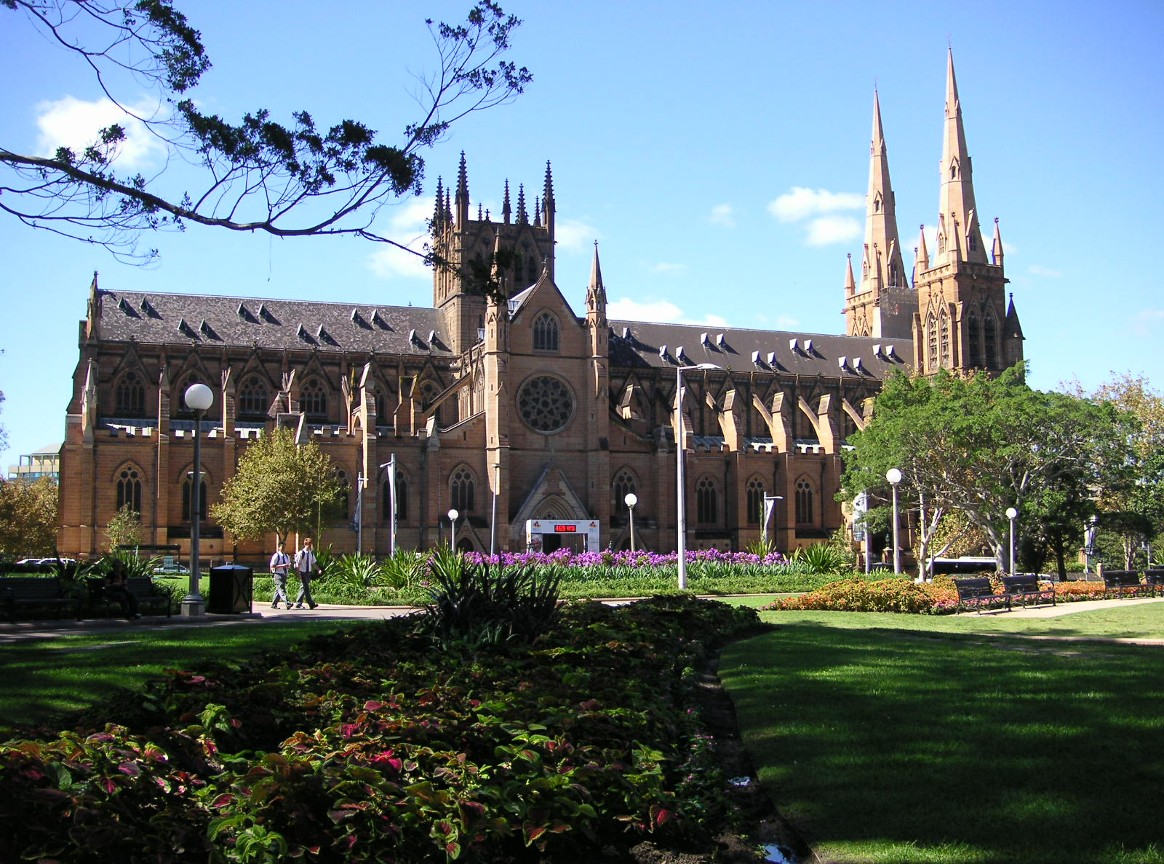
St Mary's Cathedral

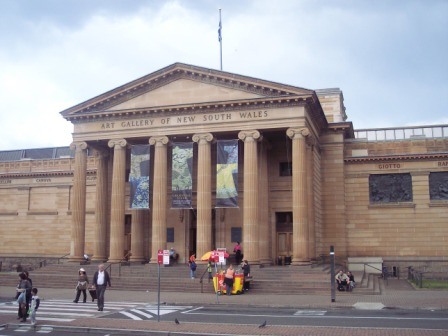
Art Gallery of New South Wales, located near the eastern end of the parish

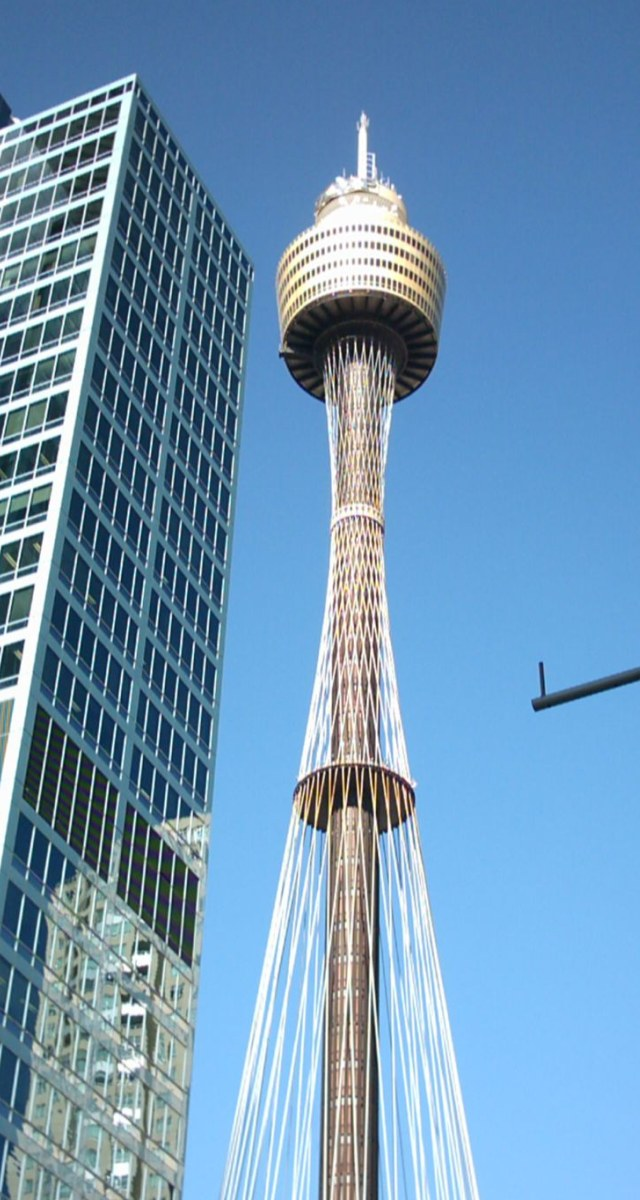
Sydney Tower, near the western end of the parish

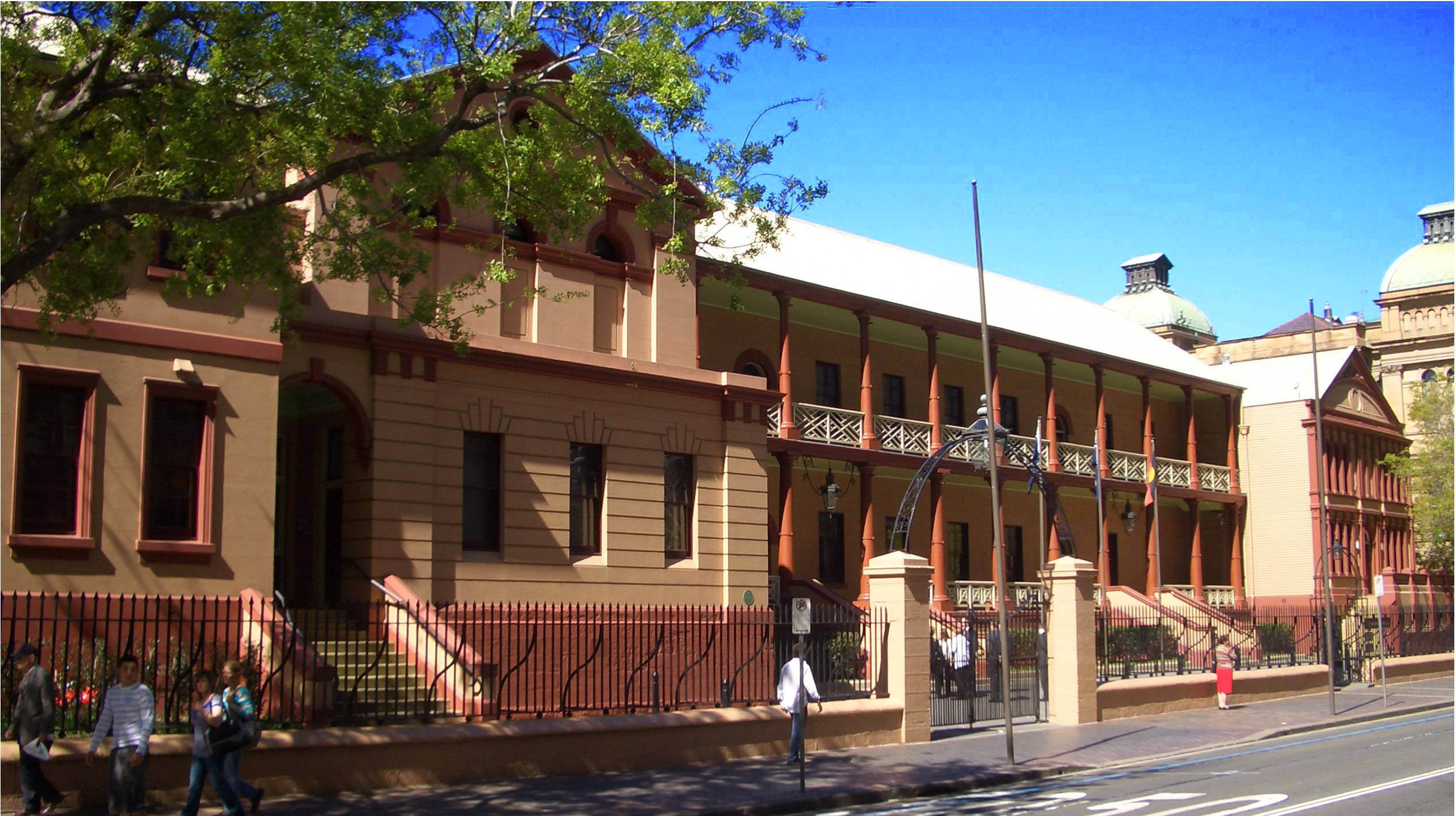
NSW parliament house

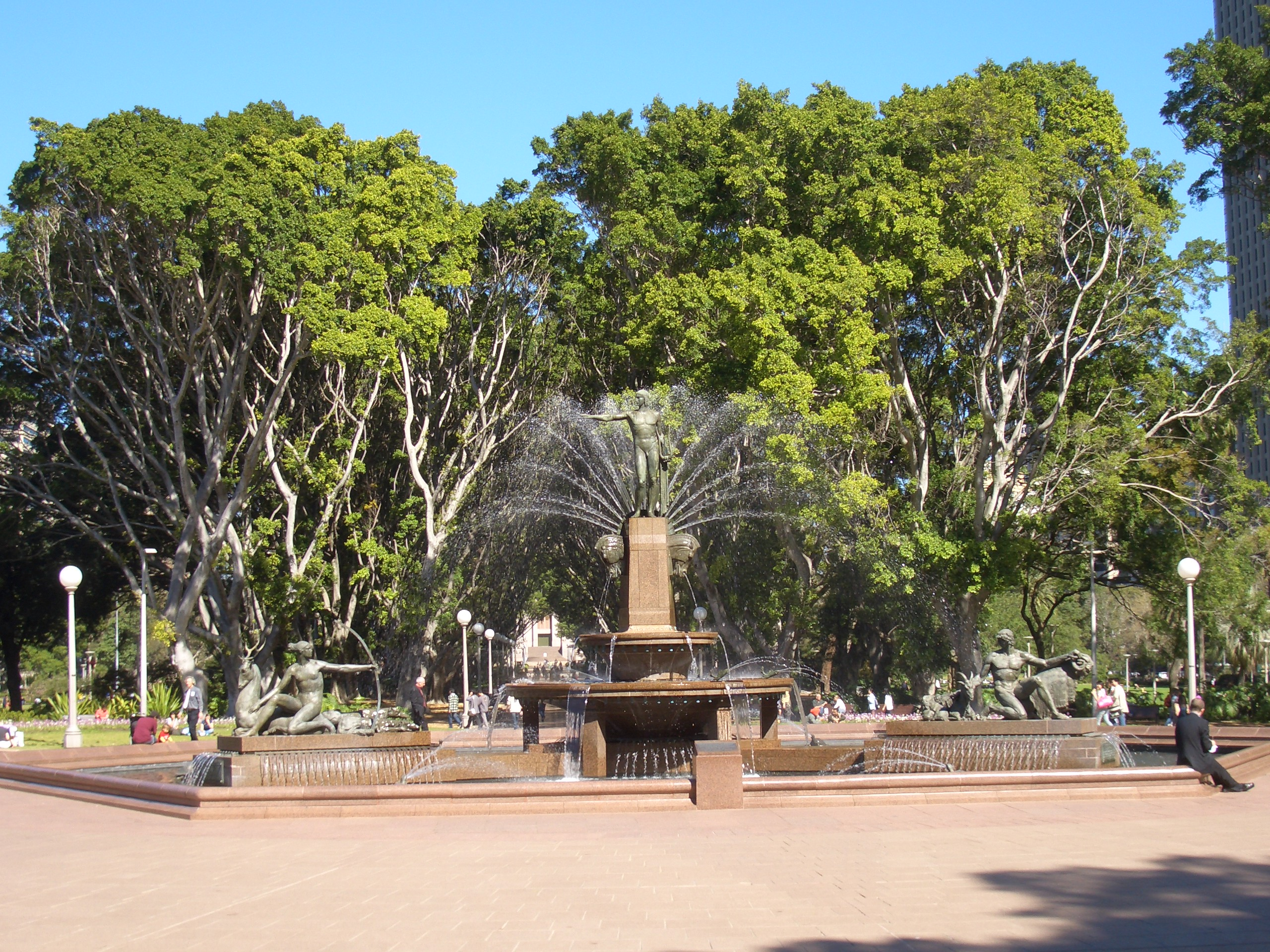
The Archibald Fountain and the surrounding northern part of Hyde Park which is north of Park Street

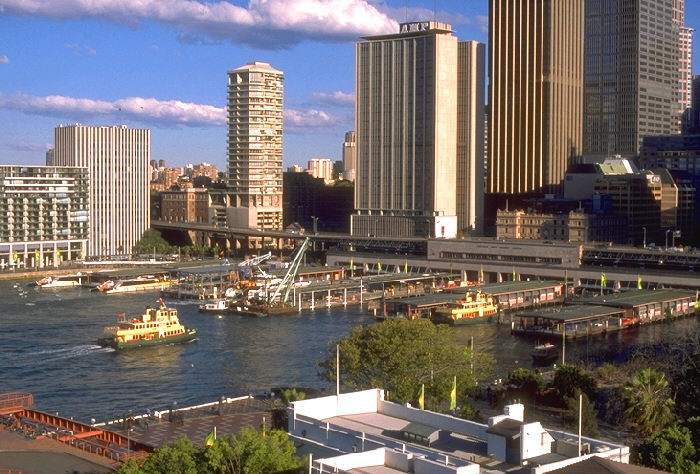
Circular Quay (the quay itself is located in St James parish, while the land this photo was taken from is in the Parish of St Philip)

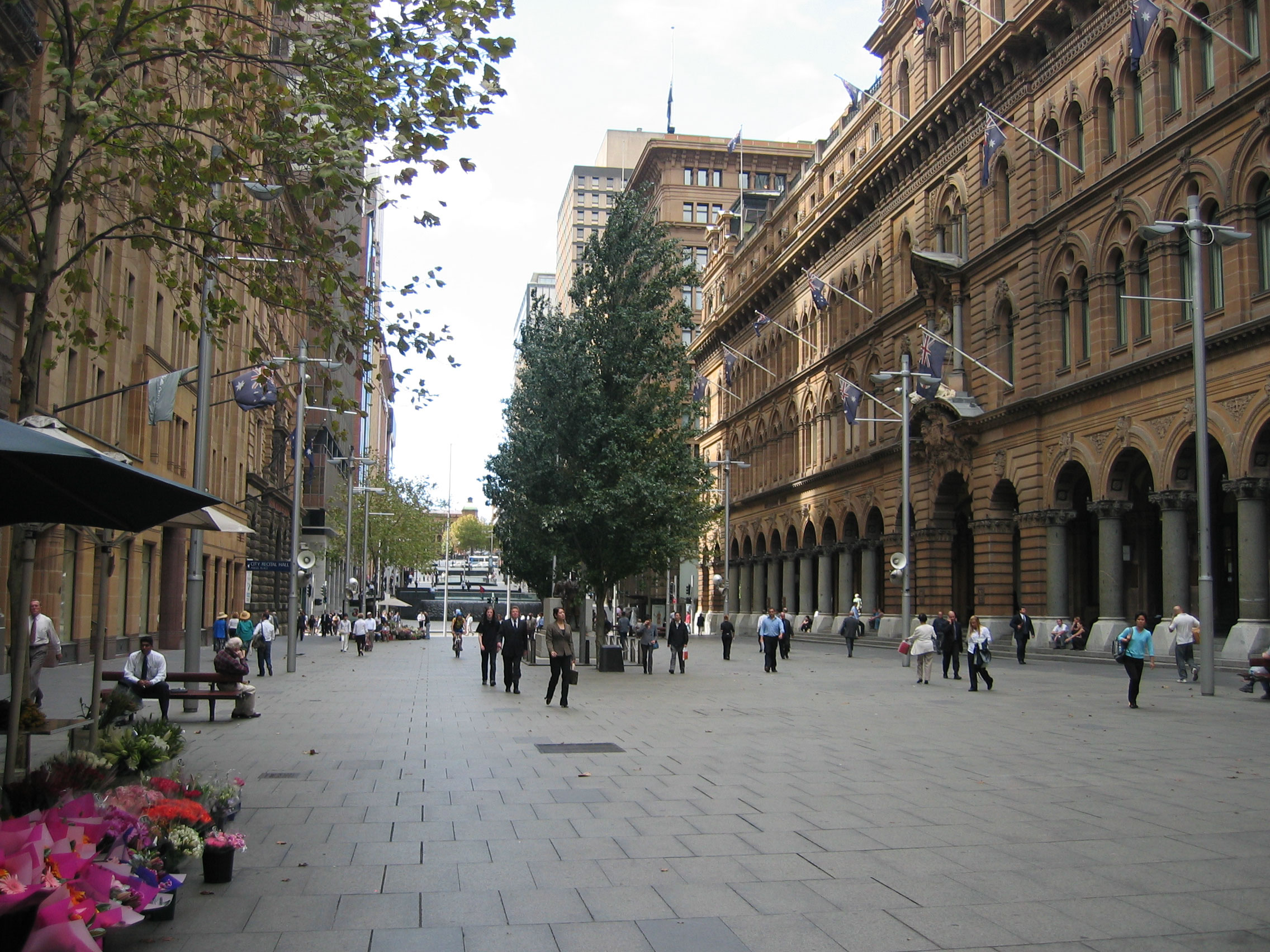
Martin Place

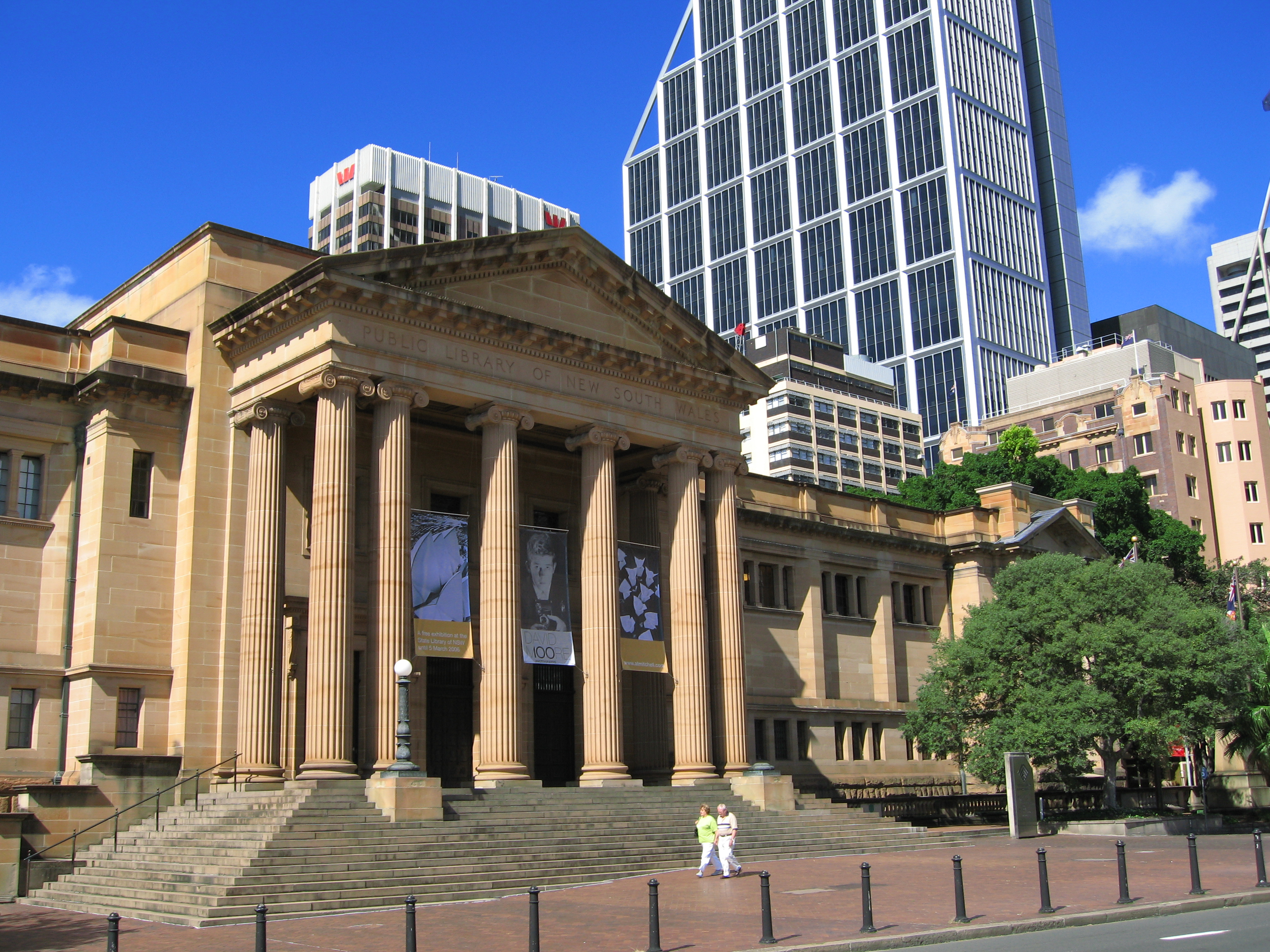
State Library of New South Wales
