= Parish of St Lawrence =

Coordinates: 33°52′26″S 151°12′23″E

St Lawrence
- Cadastral division
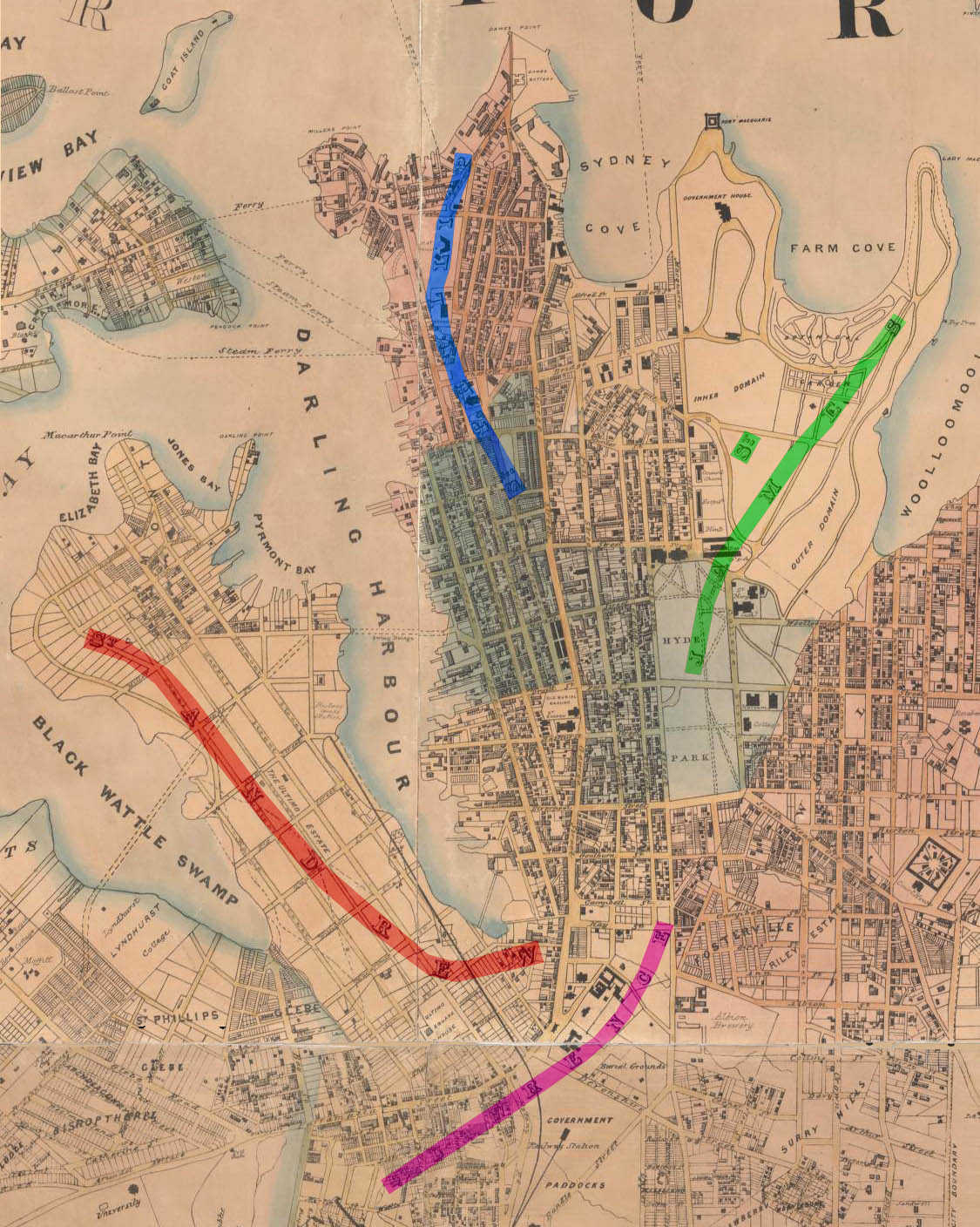
- Location in Sydney city highlighted in magenta
- Country: Australia
- State: New South Wales
- LGA: City of Sydney
- Established: 1835
- County: Cumberland
- Hundred (former): Sydney
Lands administrative divisions around St Lawrence
St Andrew	St James	St James
St Andrew	St Lawrence	Alexandria
Alexandria	Alexandria	Alexandria

St Lawrence Parish is one of the 57 parishes of Cumberland County, New South Wales, Australia, a cadastral unit for use on land titles. It is one of the four small parishes in the Sydney city area. Unlike the other three parishes, St Lawrence was not named after a New Testament saint but after St Lawrence, the second Bishop of Canterbury, successor to St Augustine of Canterbury, presumably very familiar to Bishop Broughton from his time in Canterbury. The church in the parish was dedicated by the bishop as Christ Church. Later, as it became more "tractarian" and Anglo-Catholic, the name of the parish was added to that of the church. However, by then, St Lawrence was understood to refer to the only saint of that name in the Book of Common Prayer, St Lawrence, (in the Prayer Book, Archdeacon) of Rome, and St Laurence of Rome (now spelt with "u") has since been considered the patron saint of the church.

The area of the parish includes Central station, Museum station, the southern part of Hyde Park below Park street, and Prince Alfred Park. The parish is bounded by George Street in the west, Park Street and a small part of William Street in the north, a line from the intersection of Yurong and William streets to the intersection of Albion and Elizabeth streets in the east, also part of Elizabeth Street forms the boundary further south, as well as Chalmers Street. Regent Street is the boundary in the south west. It includes the Anzac Memorial. The parish is relatively thin east-west, so that Central railway station nearly covers the entire width of the parish.

== Images ==
Images of locations in the Parish of St Lawrence:

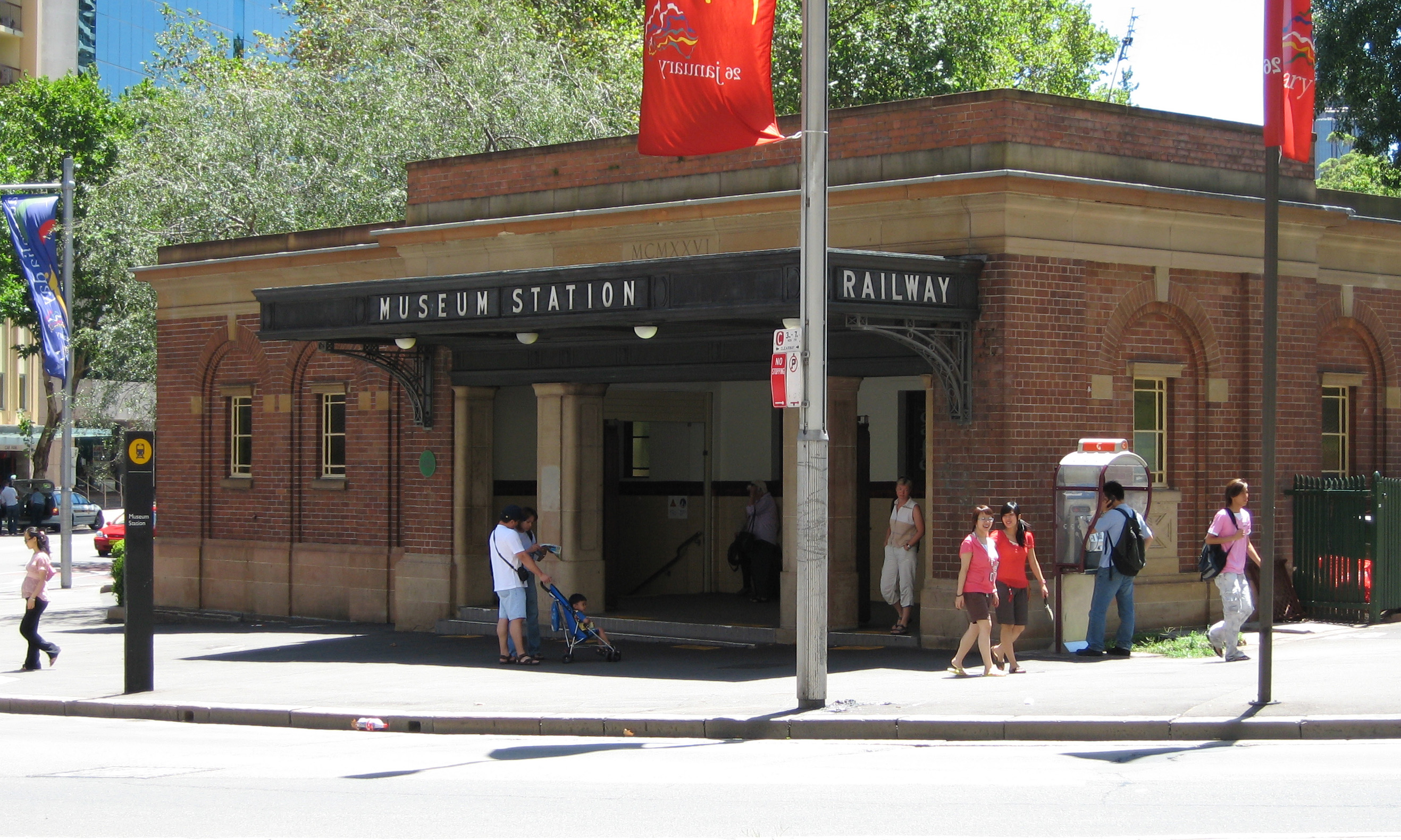
Museum station

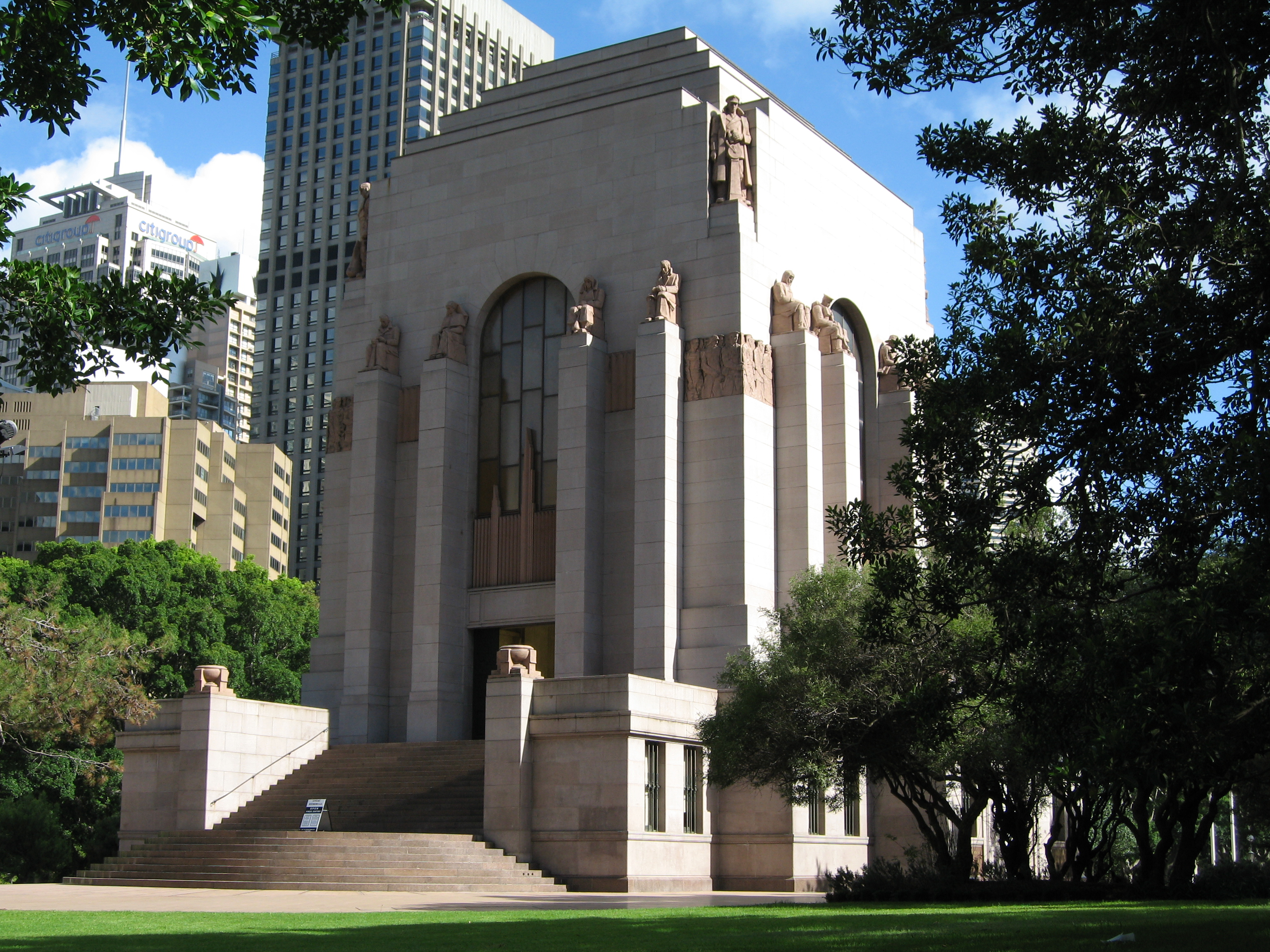
Anzac Memorial, and the surrounding southern part of Hyde Park

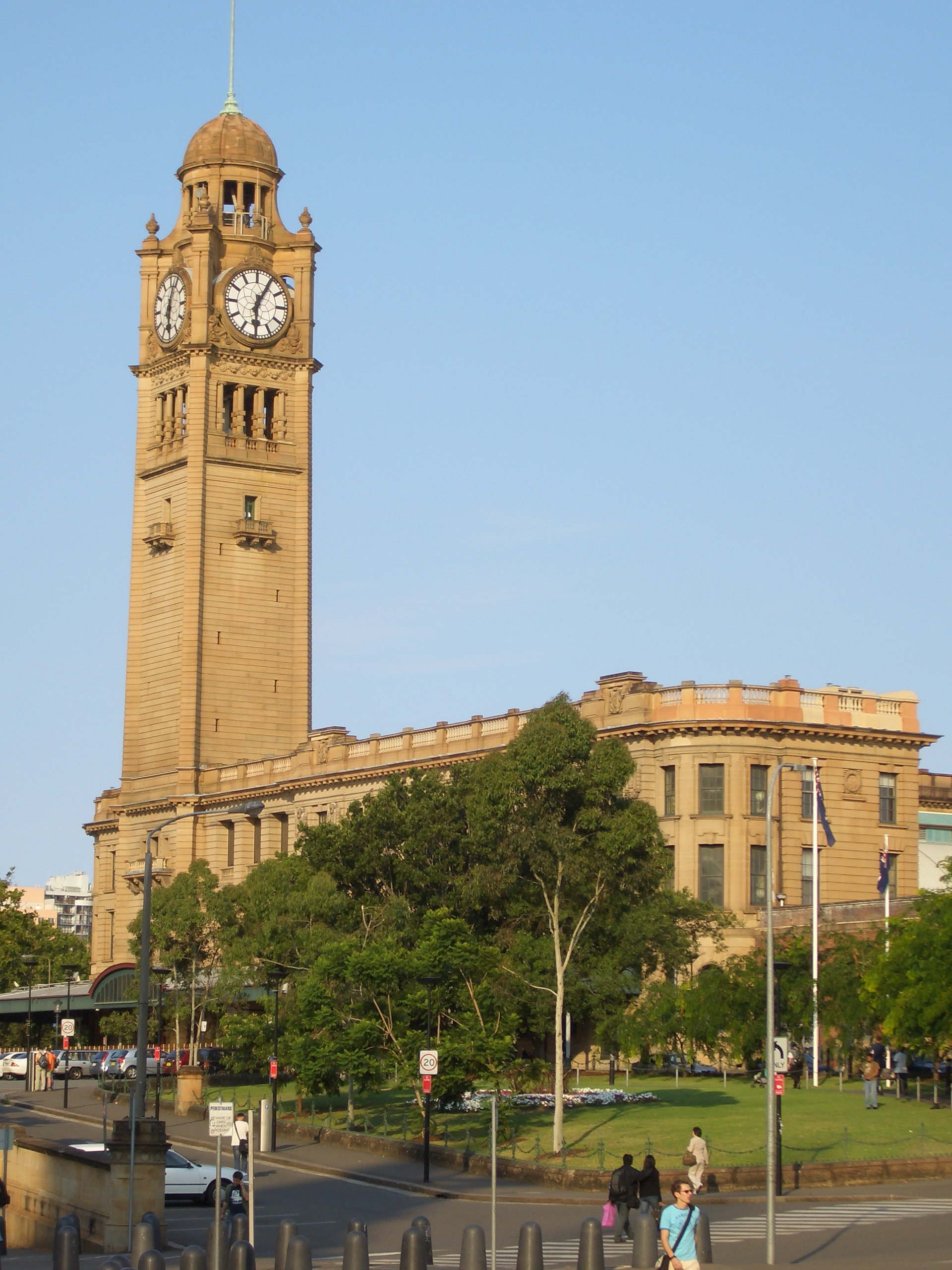
Central railway station

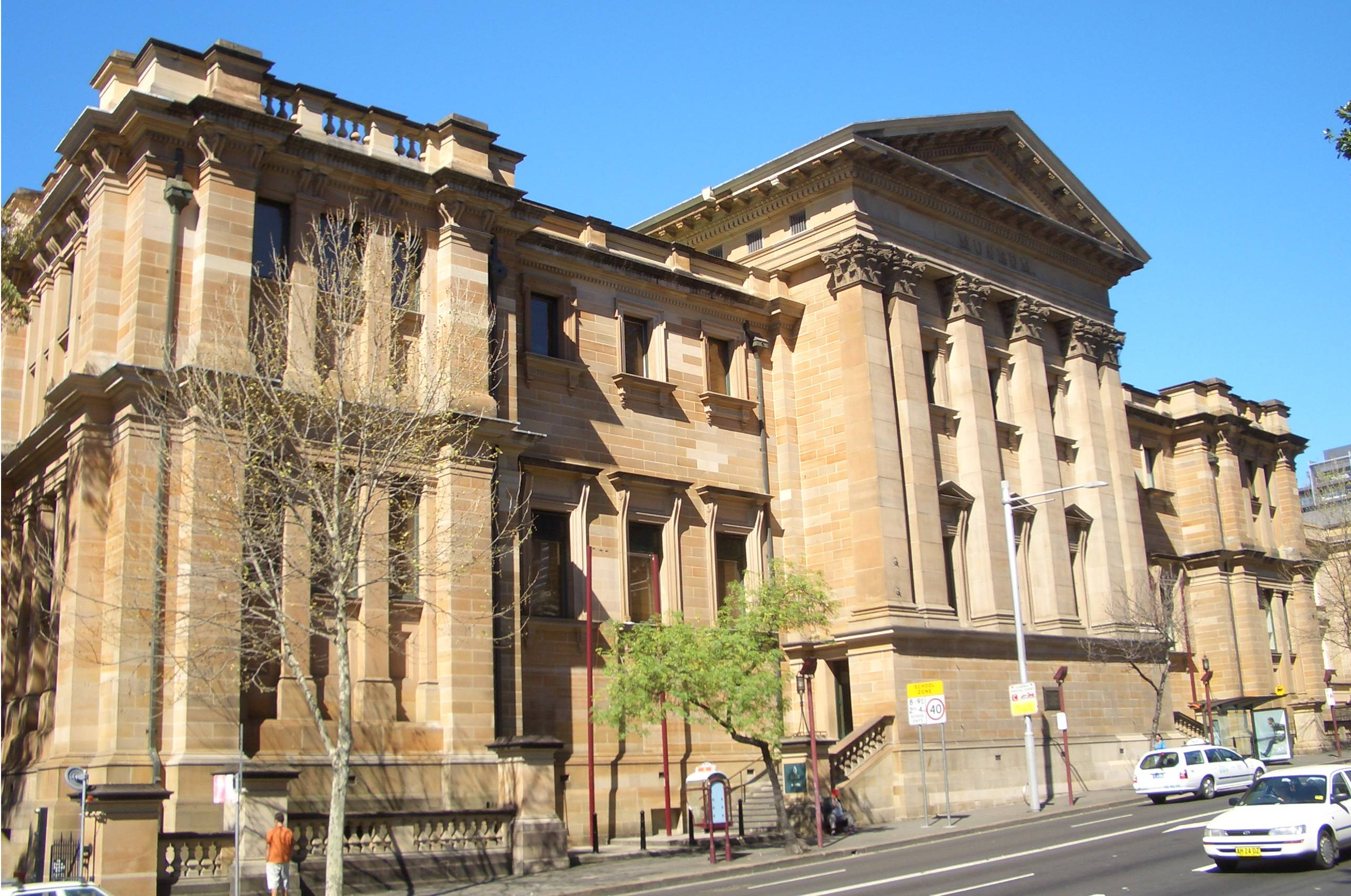
The Australian Museum is at the north-eastern tip of the parish
