= Parish of St George =

Coordinates: 33°56′54″S 151°06′04″E

St George
- Cadastral division
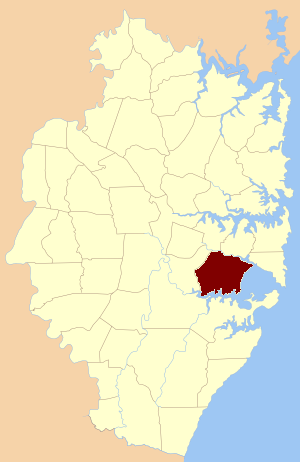
- Location of the parish within Cumberland
- Country: Australia
- State: New South Wales
- LGA: City of Canterbury-Bankstown, Georges River Council, Bayside Council
- Established: 1835
- County: Cumberland
- Hundred (former): Sydney
Lands administrative divisions around St George
Concord	Petersham	Botany
Bankstown	St George	Botany Bay
Holsworthy	Sutherland	Sutherland

St George Parish is one of the 57 parishes of Cumberland County, New South Wales, a cadastral unit for use on land titles. It is bounded in the north by the Cooks River, in the west by Cox's Creek and Salt Pan Creek, and in the south by the Georges River and in the east by Botany Bay.

The parish covers the local government area of Georges River Council (in the southeast), the western part of Bayside Council (formerly the City of Rockdale) in the northeast, and the eastern part of the City of Canterbury-Bankstown (formerly the City of Canterbury) in the north.

The name of the parish is used as the region name today, although most modern customary uses of the region name refer to the part of the parish that lies south of Wolli Creek and The M5 in Georges River Council and Bayside Council which is considered part of Southern Sydney. This excludes the northern part of the parish within the City of Canterbury-Bankstown that is considered part of South-Western Sydney.

In some instances the whole cadastral Parish of St George (both north and south) is grouped together and considered the inner south-west due to its geographical location from Sydney CBD.

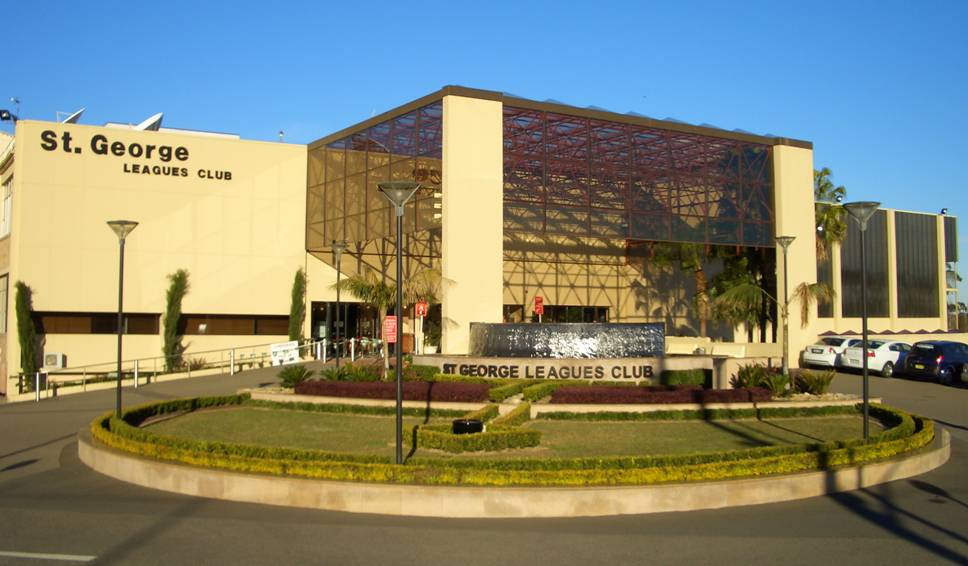
The St George Illawarra Dragons leagues club, the name of the football team came indirectly from the original parish name.

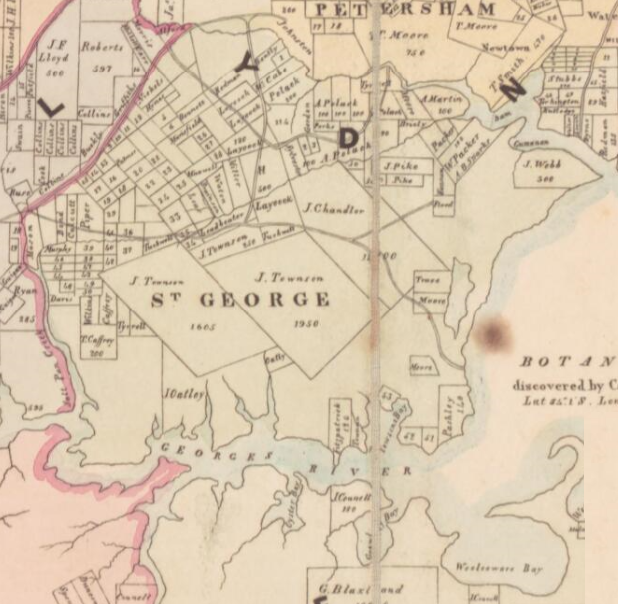
Parish of St George, New South Wales in 1840.
