= Parish of Concord =

Coordinates: 33°51′54″S 151°06′04″E

Concord
- Cadastral division
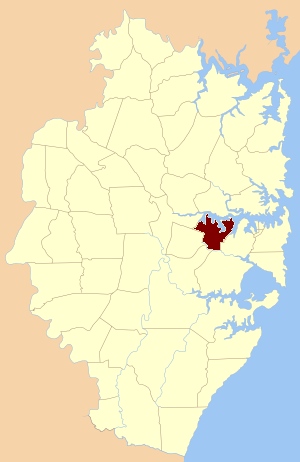
- Location of the parish within Cumberland
- Country: Australia
- State: New South Wales
- LGA: City of Canada Bay, Municipality of Burwood, Municipality of Strathfield
- Established: 1835
- County: Cumberland
- Hundred (former): Sydney
Lands administrative divisions around Concord
| St John | Hunters Hill | Willoughby |
| Liberty Plains | Concord | Petersham |
| Bankstown | St George | St George |

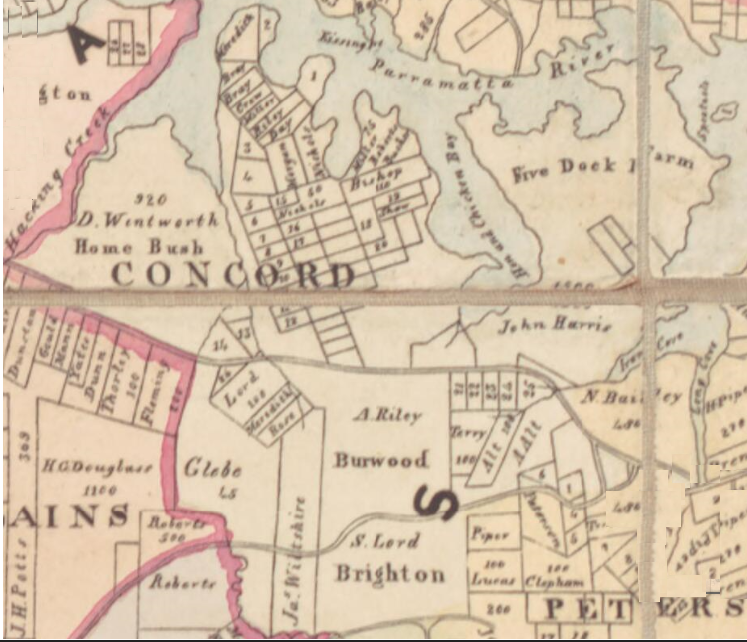
Map of Concord Parish, New South Wales in 1840.

Concord Parish is one of the 57 parishes of Cumberland County, New South Wales, a cadastral unit for use on land titles. It is to the south of the Parramatta River between Homebush Bay and Iron Cove; and to the north of Cooks River. It includes the suburbs of Homebush (but not Flemington), most of Strathfield, Burwood, Croydon, Concord, Canada Bay, Abbotsford and Drummoyne. It covers the local government areas of City of Canada Bay and the Municipality of Burwood and most of the Municipality of Strathfield (excluding the western part of the municipality that was incorporated in 1892). It roughly corresponds to the western half of the Inner West region, with the neighbouring Parish of Petersham making up the eastern half.
