= Parish of Petersham =

Coordinates: 33°51′54″S 151°10′04″E

Petersham
- Cadastral division
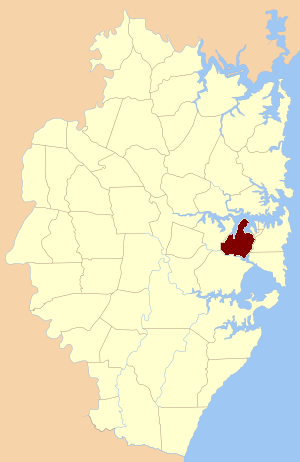
- Location of the parish within Cumberland
- Country: Australia
- State: New South Wales
- LGA: Inner West Council
- Established: 1835
- County: Cumberland
- Hundred (former): Sydney
Lands administrative divisions around Petersham
Hunters Hill	Willoughby	St Andrew
Concord	Petersham	Alexandria
St George	St George	Botany

Petersham Parish is one of the 57 parishes of Cumberland County, New South Wales, a cadastral unit for use on land titles.

== Location ==
It is located to the south of Iron Cove, Rozelle Bay and the Parramatta River, and to the north of Cooks River.

== Characteristics ==
It includes the suburbs of Annandale, Ashfield, Balmain, Camperdown, Canterbury, Glebe, Leichhardt, Marrickville, Newtown, Petersham, St Peters and Tempe . It roughly corresponds to the eastern half of the Inner West region, with the neighbouring Parish of Concord making up the western half.
