= Parish of Botany =

Botany
- Cadastral division
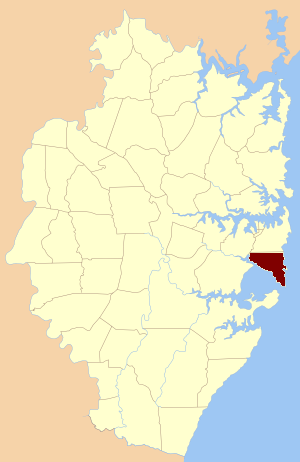
- Location of the parish within Cumberland
- Country: Australia
- State: New South Wales
- LGA: Bayside Council, City of Randwick
- Established: 1835
- County: Cumberland
- Hundred (former): Sydney
Lands administrative divisions around Botany
Petersham	Alexandria	Pacific Ocean
St George	Botany	Pacific Ocean
St George	Sutherland	Pacific Ocean

Botany Parish, Cumberland is one of the 57 parishes of Cumberland County, New South Wales, a cadastral unit for use on land titles. It contains the area to the north of Botany Bay and to the east of part of Cooks River. It includes the suburbs of La Perouse, Hillsdale, Banksmeadow and Maroubra. It also includes Sydney Airport.
