= Bayside Council =

- Local government area
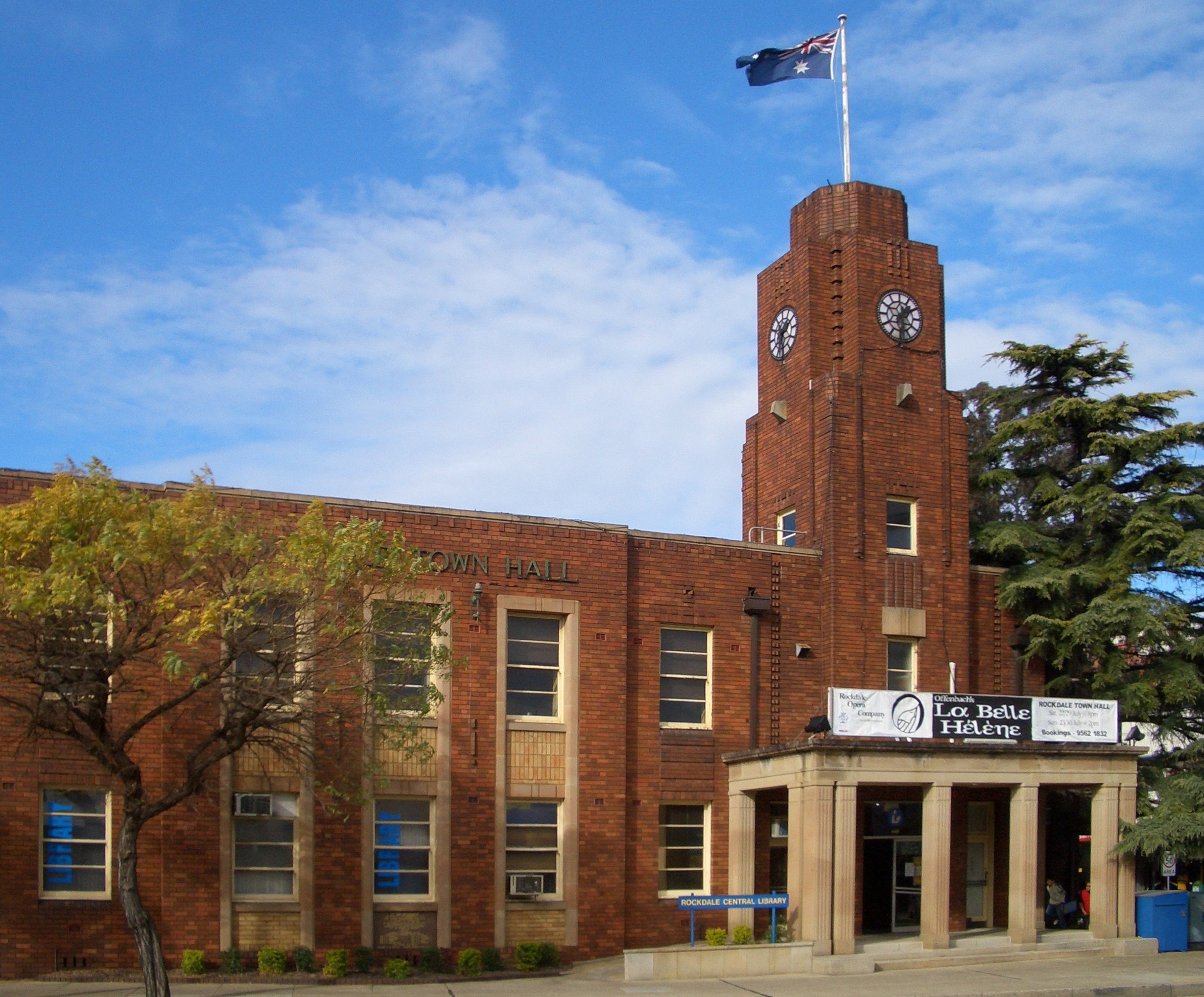
- Rockdale Town Hall

- Interactive map of Bayside Council
- Country: Australia
- State: New South Wales
- Region: Eastern Suburbs; Southern Sydney
- Established: 9 September 2016
- Council seat: Rockdale Town Hall

Government
  - Mayor: Christina Curry
  - State electorates: Heffron; Kogarah; Maroubra; Rockdale
  - Federal divisions: Barton; Cook; Kingsford Smith

Area
  - Total: 50 km^{2} (19 sq mi)

Population
  - Totals: 175,184 (2021 census); 182,987 (2023 est.)
  - Density: 3,500/km^{2} (9,100/sq mi)
- Parish: Botany, St George
- Website: Bayside Council
LGAs around Bayside Council
Inner West	Sydney	Randwick
Canterbury Bankstown	Bayside Council	Randwick
Georges River	Sutherland	Sutherland

Bayside Council is a local government area in Sydney, New South Wales, Australia. It is located around part of Botany Bay, 7 kilometres (4.3 mi) to 12 kilometres (7.5 mi) south of the Sydney CBD. It includes 29 suburbs in Sydney's South. It comprises an area of 50 square kilometres (19 sq mi) and in 2023 had an estimated population of 182,987. The council was formed on 9 September 2016 from the merger of the City of Botany Bay and the City of Rockdale.

The council's mayor is Christina Curry, of the Australian Labor Party, elected by the council on 30 September 2026.

== Suburbs and localities in the local government area ==
Suburbs in the Bayside Council area are:

- Arncliffe
- Banksia
- Banksmeadow
- Bardwell Park
- Bardwell Valley
- Bexley
- Bexley North
- Botany
- Brighton-Le-Sands
- Carlton (parts are located in Georges River Council)
- Daceyville
- Dolls Point
- Eastgardens
- Eastlakes
- Hillsdale
- Kingsgrove (parts are located in Canterbury-Bankstown & Georges River Council)
- Kogarah (parts are located in Georges River Council)
- Kyeemagh
- Matraville (most is located in City of Randwick)
- Mascot (minor part located in Inner West Council)
- Monterey
- Pagewood (minor part is located in City of Randwick)
- Ramsgate (parts are located in Georges River Council)
- Ramsgate Beach
- Rockdale
- Rosebery (parts are located in City of Sydney council)
- Sandringham
- Sans Souci (parts are located in Georges River Council)
- Turrella
- Wolli Creek

Bayside Council also manages and maintains the following localities:

- Bardwell Creek
- Bado-berong Creek
- Cooks Cove
- Lady Robinson Beach
- Landing Lights Wetland (Riverine Park Wetlands)
- Muddy Creek
- Rockdale Bicentennial Park
- Rocky Point
- Sandringham Bay
- St Kilda Point
- Sydney Airport Wetlands
- Wolli Creek Valley

== History ==
=== Early local government history ===
==== Rockdale ====
The City of Rockdale was originally proclaimed as the "Municipal District of West Botany" on 13 January 1871. From 1872, Council met in the first Council Chambers, a small purpose-built stone building on the western side of Rocky Point Road, Arncliffe. It continued in use until 11 December 1888, when a new Town Hall was opened on the corner of Rocky Point Road and Bryant Street, Rockdale. By the time the neighbouring Boroughs of Botany and North Botany (Mascot from 1911) were proclaimed on 29 March 1888, it was clear that a name change was desirable. On 17 May 1888 the Parliament of New South Wales passed the Rockdale Municipality Naming Act (No.33, 1888), and West Botany became the "Municipal District of Rockdale". The 1887 Town Hall was replaced by the current Rockdale Town Hall in 1940, and was designed by Rockdale architect Douglas Gardiner. Under the Local Government (Areas) Act 1948, the Municipality of Bexley, which was located immediately to the West and had separated from Hurstville in 1900, became the First Ward of Rockdale Municipality. Rockdale was declared a city in 1995 as the "City of Rockdale".

==== Botany ====
The City of Botany Bay was first proclaimed on 29 March 1888 as the "Borough of Botany", and met from 1899 to 2016 in the Botany Town Hall. The northern section of the City of Botany Bay was first incorporated as the "Borough of North Botany" on 29 March 1888. From 28 December 1906, following the passing of the Local Government Act, 1906, the councils were renamed as the "Municipality of North Botany" and the "Municipality of Botany". The Municipality of North Botany was renamed as the "Municipality of Mascot" on 31 October 1911. Under the Local Government (Areas) Act 1948, the Municipality of Mascot was amalgamated into Botany, within a reconstituted Municipality of Botany. Botany remained a municipality until 11 May 1996, when it was proclaimed the "City of Botany Bay".

=== Establishment of Bayside Council ===
A 2015 review of local government boundaries by the NSW Government Independent Pricing and Regulatory Tribunal recommended that the City of Botany Bay amalgamate with the City of Rockdale to form a new council with an area of 50 square kilometres (19 sq mi) and support a population of approximately 153,000.

There was significant community opposition to the merger from within both communities. In Botany Bay, residents were given the chance to have their say in a community poll which was held on 27 February 2016. Ultimately 97.8 per cent of Botany Bay residents voted 'no' when asked the question 'Do you agree that the City of Botany Bay should merge with Rockdale City Council?'. Rockdale City Council indicated their preference to merge with the City of Kogarah and the City of Hurstville, forming a single "St George Council". Botany Bay also attempted to seek a compromise by proposing to merge with the City of Randwick and parts of the City of Sydney.

With the proclamation of the majority of council amalgamations on 12 May 2016, the City of Botany Bay Council appealed the decision in the Supreme Court of New South Wales, thereby delaying the proposed amalgamation until a decision was made by the Court. The Supreme Court rejected the appeal in early September 2016, and the Minister for Local Government, Paul Toole, moved quickly to proclaim the formation of Bayside Council on 9 September 2016, with the former administrator of Central Darling Shire, Greg Wright, appointed as the Administrator. On 9 September 2017, the first council consisting of fifteen councillors across 5 wards was elected, and the former mayor of Rockdale, Bill Saravinovski, was elected as the first mayor on 27 September.

The early period of the council was punctuated by revelations of the extent of issues inherited from the former Botany Bay Council, including an antiquated vehicle fleet costing millions of dollars to replace, and the legacy of ICAC investigations that uncovered the significant misappropriation of funds and fraud by former Botany Bay Council employees, which had led to 12 individuals being recommended for prosecution. The first mayor of Bayside Council, Bill Saravinovski, in particular noted that, "The legacy of the misappropriations and costs of remediation result[ed] in a net fund deficit of $17 million, placing Bayside Council at a significant disadvantage".

== Demographics ==
At the 2016 census, there were 156,058 people in the Bayside local government area; of these 49.5 per cent were male and 50.5 per cent were female. Aboriginal and Torres Strait Islander people made up 1.0 per cent of the population; significantly below the NSW and Australian averages of 2.9 and 2.8 per cent respectively. The median age of people in Bayside Council was 35 years; slightly lower than the national median of 38 years. Children aged 0 – 14 years made up 21.4 per cent of the population and people aged 65 years and over made up 13.5 per cent of the population. Of people in the area aged 15 years and over, 61.6 per cent were married and 7.1 per cent were either divorced or separated.

At the 2016 census, the proportion of residents in the Bayside local government area who stated their ancestry as Australian or Anglo-Saxon approached 29 per cent of all residents. In excess of 51 per cent of all residents in Bayside Council nominated a religious affiliation with Christianity at the 2016 census, which was below the national average of 57.7 per cent. Meanwhile, as at the census date, compared to the national average, households in the Bayside local government area had a lower than average proportion (20.7 per cent) where two or more languages are spoken (national average was 22.2 per cent); and a lower proportion (41.1 per cent) where English only was spoken at home (national average was 72.7 per cent).

Selected historical census data for Bayside Council local government area
Census year		2016
Population	Estimated residents on census night	156,058
Population	LGA rank in terms of size within New South Wales	17th
Population	% of New South Wales population	2.09%
Population	% of Australian population	0.67%
Population	Estimated ATSI population on census night	1,555
Population	% of ATSI population to residents	1.00%
Cultural and language diversity		
Ancestry, top responses	English	14.95%
Ancestry, top responses	Australian	14.80%
Ancestry, top responses	Chinese	13.81%
Ancestry, top responses	Greek	8.98%
Ancestry, top responses	Lebanese	5.10%
Language, top responses (other than English)	Greek	7.06%
Language, top responses (other than English)	Mandarin	6.71%
Language, top responses (other than English)	Arabic	5.85%
Language, top responses (other than English)	Cantonese	3.80%
Religious affiliation		
Religious affiliation, top responses	Catholic	23.55%
Religious affiliation, top responses	No religion, as described	20.49%
Religious affiliation, top responses	Eastern Orthodox	12.54%
Religious affiliation, top responses	Not stated	9.44%
Religious affiliation, top responses	Islam	8.72%
Median weekly incomes		
Personal income	Median weekly personal income	A$693
Personal income	% of Australian median income	104.68%
Family income	Median weekly family income	A$1,833
Family income	% of Australian median income	105.71%
Household income	Median weekly household income	A$1,601
Household income	% of Australian median income	111.34%

== Council ==
Bayside Council has fifteen councillors, with three councillors elected in each of five wards by a preferential voting system. On 9 September 2017 the first council was elected. The mayor is appointed biennially and deputy mayor annually by the councillors at the first meeting of the council.

Mayor	Term	Notes
Greg Wright (Administrator)	9 September 2016 – 27 September 2017	GM Camden 2004–12, Broken Hill 2013, Administrator Central Darling 2013–16.
Bill Saravinovski (ALP)	27 September 2017 – 25 September 2019	Mayor of Rockdale 1995–1996, 2006–2007, 2008–2009, 2010–2012, 2015–2016. Deputy Mayor 2005–2006 Sep-Dec 2009. Rockdale Third Ward Councillor 1983-2016
Joe Awada (ALP)	25 September 2019 – 29 September 2021	
Bill Saravinovski (ALP)	29 September 2021 – 4 December 2021	
Christina Curry (ALP)	5 January 2022 – 20 September 2023	
Bill Saravinovski (ALP)	20 September 2023 – 14 September 2024	
Ed McDougall (ALP)	9 October 2024 – 30 September 2024	
Christina Curry (ALP)	1 October 2026 – present	
Deputy Mayor	Term	Notes
Joe Awada (ALP)	27 September 2017 – 25 September 2019	Rockdale Fourth Ward Councillor 2004–2016
James Macdonald (IND)	25 September 2019 – 29 September 2021	
Michael Nagi (IND)	29 September 2021 – 4 December 2021	
Scott Morrissey (ALP)	5 January 2022 – 20 September 2023	
Joe Awada (ALP)	20 September 2023 – 14 September	
Heidi Douglas (PBAY)	9 October 2024 – 30 September 2026	
Scott Morrissey (ALP)	1 October 2026 – present	
General Manager	Term	Notes
Meredith Wallace	9 September 2016 – present	General Manager of Rockdale 2011–2016

=== Current composition ===
The most recent election was held on 14 September 2024, and the makeup of the council, by order of election, is as follows:

Party	Councillors
Australian Labor Party	6
Liberal Party of Australia	5
Peaceful Bayside	2
The Greens	1
Independents	1
Total	15

Ward	Councillor	Party	Notes
Ward 1	Christina Curry	Labor	Elected 2017; Botany Bay Ward Three Councillor 2012–2016; Mayor 2022–2023 and from 2026.
Ward 1	Scott Morrissey	Labor	Elected 2017; Deputy Mayor 2022–2023 and from 2026.
Ward 1	Ron Bezic	Liberal	Ward 4 Councillor 2017–2021; Rockdale Fifth Ward Councillor 2012–2016.
Ward 2	Soraya Kassim	Labor	
Ward 2	Jerome Boutelet	Liberal	
Ward 2	Peter Strong	The Greens	
Ward 3	Michael Nagi	Liberal	Elected 2017; Ward 2 Councillor 2017–2024; Rockdale Deputy Mayor 2015–2016; Deputy Mayor 2021–2022.
Ward 3	Chris Saravinovski	Labor	
Ward 3	Janin Bredehoft	Peaceful Bayside	
Ward 4	Joe Awada	Labor	Elected 2017; Mayor 2019–2021; Deputy Mayor 2017–2019, 2023–2024.
Ward 4	Fiona Douskou	Liberal	
Ward 4	Liza Barlow	Independent	Elected 2017; Rockdale Deputy Mayor 2012–2015.
Ward 5	Vicki Poulos	Liberal	Ward 5 Councillor 2017–2021.
Ward 5	Edward McDougall	Labor	Mayor 2024-2026
Ward 5	Heidi Douglas	Peaceful Bayside	Deputy Mayor 2024-2026

=== Ward names ===
Owing to a perceived confusion over the ward names, particularly from members of the public not able to distinguish between their ward and their suburb, at its meeting on 14 November 2018, Bayside Council voted to exhibit changes to the ward names: "Port Botany Ward" to Ward 1, "Mascot Ward" to Ward 2, "Rockdale Ward" to Ward 3, "Bexley Ward" to Ward 4, and "Botany Bay Ward" to Ward 5. At the subsequent meeting on 13 February 2019, Bayside Council voted to adopt these changes, despite the public consultation resulting in 69% of 83 submissions not supporting the change of ward names to numbers.

== Election results ==
=== 2024 ===
2024 New South Wales local elections: Bayside
Party	Votes	%	Swing	Seats	Change
Labor	28,136	34.6%	−11.1%	6	▼1
Liberal	22,088	27.2%	+17.9% (Note: Compared to the Independent Liberal result in 2021.)	5	▲3
Peaceful Bayside	11,536	14.2%	+10.5%	2	▲1
Greens	10,281	12.7%	−0.8%	1	Steady
Independents	9,192	11.3%	−16.5%	1	▼3
Formal votes	81,233				
Informal votes					
Total				15	

=== 2021 ===
The Liberal Party did not endorse any candidates, including its five councillors elected in 2017.

2021 New South Wales local elections: Bayside
Party	Votes	%	Swing	Seats	Change
Labor	37,157	45.7	−0.3	7	Steady
Independent	22,563	27.8	+7.8	4	▲1
Independent Liberal	7,564	9.3	−17.9 (Note: Compared with the Liberal Party result at the 2017 election.)	2	▼5
Peaceful Bayside	3,015	3.7		1	▲1
Greens	10,969	13.5	+6.8	1	▲1
Formal votes	81,268				

== Council logo ==
In August 2017, Bayside Council selected its new logo via a public competition and vote, with Mascot resident, Ray Kurniawan's design winning. The logo depicts a sailing boat above water, with Kurniawan describing its symbolism: "The concept to use the boat came from the idea that to move forward in a boat everyone has to row together. Bayside is a new community and to move forward everyone needs to work together".

== See also ==
- Local government areas of New South Wales
