= Parish of Alexandria =

Coordinates: 33°50′54″S 151°17′04″E

Alexandria
- Cadastral division
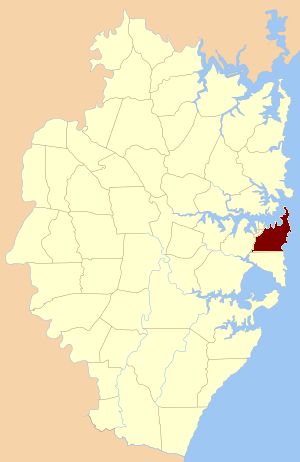
- Location of the parish within Cumberland
- Country: Australia
- State: New South Wales
- LGA: Randwick, Sydney, Woollahra, Waverley
- Established: 1835
- County: Cumberland
- Hundred (former): Sydney
Lands administrative divisions around Alexandria
St Lawrence	Willoughby	Pacific Ocean
Petersham	Alexandria	Pacific Ocean
Petersham	Botany	Pacific Ocean

Alexandria Parish is one of the 57 parishes of Cumberland County, New South Wales, a cadastral unit for use on land titles. It contains the area to the south and east of Sydney city including Bondi, Paddington and Clovelly. It was probably named after the Battle of Alexandria fought in 1801. The Parish of Alexandria roughly corresponds with the "Eastern Suburbs" in the traditional narrow sense of that term. The "Eastern Suburbs" in a wide sense also includes the suburbs immediately to the south, in the Parish of Botany.
