= Parish of Marramarra =

Coordinates: 33°29′54″S 151°17′04″E

Marramarra
- Cadastral division
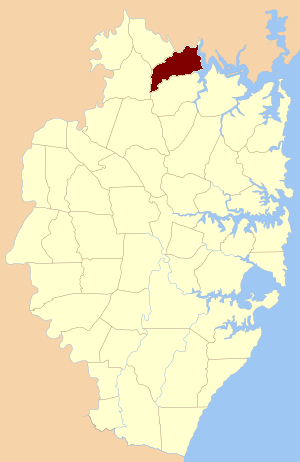
- Location of the parish within Cumberland
- Country: Australia
- State: New South Wales
- LGA: Hornsby Shire
- Established: 1835
- County: Cumberland
- Hundred (former): Dundas
Lands administrative divisions around Marramarra
Frederick	Northumberland	Northumberland
Maroota	Marramarra	Northumberland
Maroota	Berowra	Cowan

Marramarra Parish, Cumberland is one of the 57 parishes of Cumberland County, New South Wales, a cadastral unit for use on land titles.

The first landholding in the Parish of Marramarra was of 6 acres (24,000 m^{2}) on the northern side of Marramarra Creek below Mount Blake. It was purchased by John Blake for One Pound Ten Shillings Sterling on 6 June 1835. The land had been advertised for sale by auction in an advertisement dated 13 December 1834.
