= Wilton Parish =

Coordinates: 34°14′S 150°42′E

- Cadastral division
- Country: Australia
- State: New South Wales
- LGA: Wollondilly
- County: Camden
- Division: Eastern
Lands administrative divisions around Wilton Parish
Picton	Camden	Appin (Cumberland)
Couridjah	Wilton Parish	Wallandoola
Bargo	Dendrobium	Wallandoola

The Parish of Wilton is a parish of the County of Camden in New South Wales, Australia. It is located in the area around where Picton Road crosses the Hume Highway, and the area around nearby Wilton.

It is bounded by the Cataract River in the east, the Nepean River in the west and north, and the Cordeaux River in the south-west. Almost the entire boundary of the parish uses rivers, except for a small area in the south-east. The parish extends as far south as Cordeaux Dam.
