= Parish of Manangle =

Coordinates: 34°07′S 150°47′E

Manangle
- Cadastral division
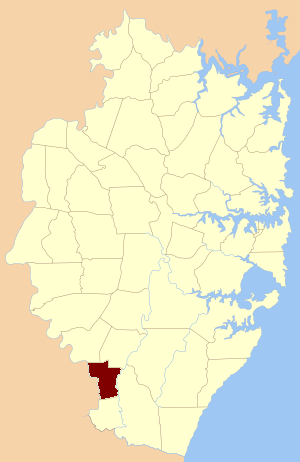
- Location of the parish within Cumberland
- Country: Australia
- State: New South Wales
- LGA: City of Campbelltown
- Established: 1835
- County: Cumberland
- Hundred (former): Campbelltown
Lands administrative divisions around Manangle
Cabramatta	St Peter	Eckersley
Camden(Camden)	Manangle	Wedderburn
Camden (Camden)	Appin	Wedderburn

Manangle Parish, Cumberland (also spelled Menangle) is one of the 57 parishes of Cumberland County, New South Wales, a cadastral unit for use on land titles. Its eastern boundary is the Georges River, and western boundary the Nepean River. It includes the southern Sydney suburbs of Menangle Park (including its railway station), Gilead, Rosemeadow and part of Glen Alpine. Major roads in the area include the South Western Freeway, Menangle Road and Appin Road.
