= North Shore (Sydney) =

Region of Sydney, New South Wales, Australia

- Region
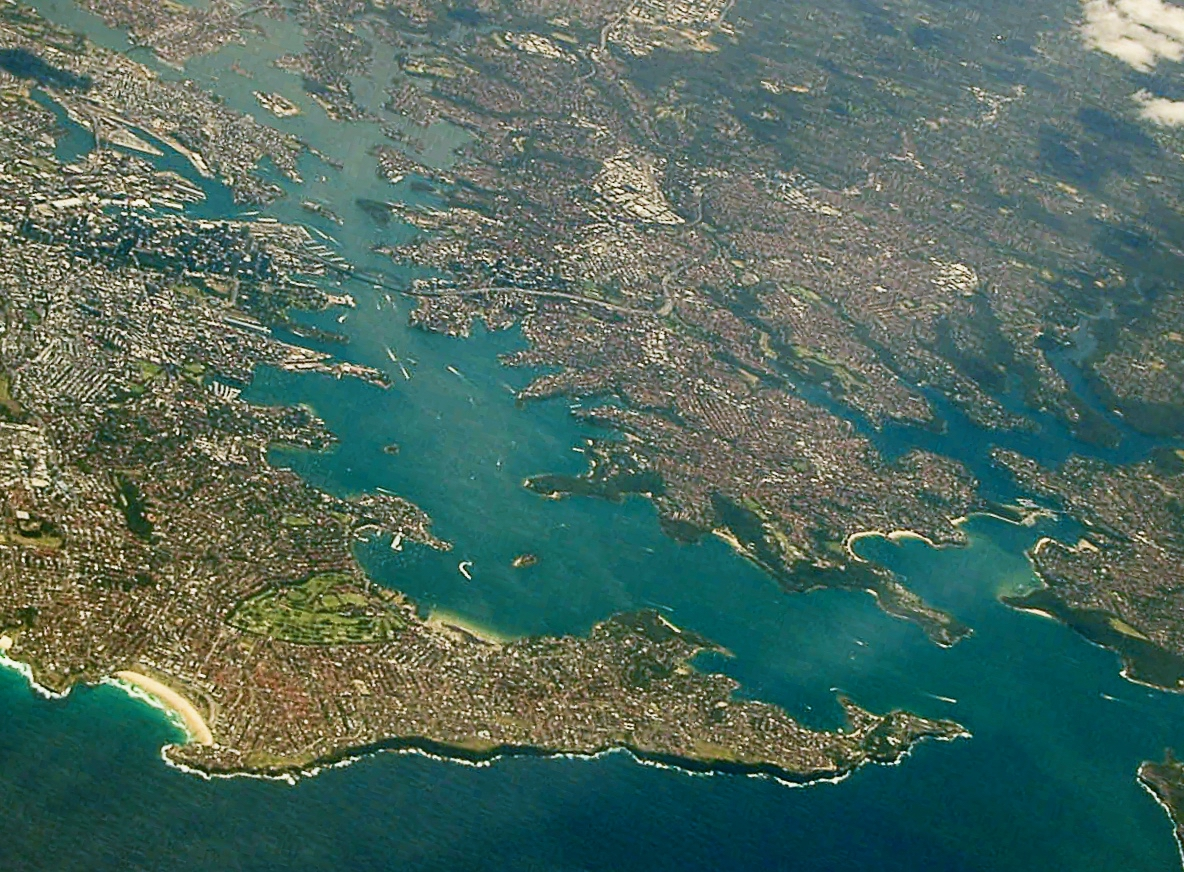
- Sydney Harbour with the North Shore extending from its northern side (right) with Sydney CBD (left) and Eastern Suburbs (bottom) on its southern shore.

- Coordinates: 33°47′S 151°10′E
- Country: Australia
- State: New South Wales
- City: Sydney
- LGA: City of Willoughby; Ku-ring-gai Council; Municipality of Lane Cove; Mosman Council; North Sydney Council; City of Ryde (parts of); Hornsby Shire; Municipality of Hunter's Hill (parts of)

Government
  - State electorate: North Shore; Willoughby; Wahroonga; Lane Cove; Epping (parts of); Hornsby (parts of); Ryde (parts of); Davidson (parts of)
  - Federal division: Bradfield; Warringah (parts of); Berowra (parts of); Bennelong (parts of)
- Time zone: UTC+10 (AEST)
  - Summer (DST): UTC+11 (AEDT)
Regions around North Shore
Hawkesbury River	Central Coast	Forest District
Hills District; Northern Sydney	North Shore	Northern Beaches
Greater Western Sydney	Inner West	Sydney CBD

The North Shore is a region within Northern Sydney, in New South Wales, Australia, generally referring to suburbs located on the northern side of Sydney Harbour up to Hornsby, and suburbs between Middle Harbour and the Lane Cove River. The term "North Shore", used to describe this region of Sydney is customary, not legal or administrative, and is often subjective.

Due to the area's greenery and manicured lawns, it has earned the nickname the 'Leafy North Shore'.

== History ==
The region now referred to as the North Shore was home to a number of clans of the Eora. These included the Cammeraygal people whose traditional lands were located within what are now the Lower North Shore local government areas of North Sydney, Willoughby, Mosman, Manly and Warringah local government areas. The Cammeraygal people lived in the area until the 1820s and are recorded as being in the northern parts of the Sydney region for approximately 5,800 years. The Lower North Shore suburb of Cammeray takes its name from the clan, although the Cameragal clan was centred around, Kayyeemy, or Manly Cove.

Other clans included:

- Boregegal at Bradleys Head
- Cannalgal at Manly Beach
- Birrabirrigal at The Spit
- Gorualgal at Georges Head in Mosman

After the British establishment of Sydney in 1788, settlement on the North Shore of the harbour was quite limited. One of the first settlers was James Milson who lived in the vicinity of Jeffrey Street in Kirribilli, directly opposite Sydney Cove. The north shore was more rugged than the southern shore and western areas of the harbour and had limited agricultural potential. The early activities in the area included tree felling, boatbuilding and some orchard farming in the limited areas of good soil. The North Shore railway line was built in the 1890s. Access to the Sydney CBD, located on the southern shore of the harbour remained difficult until the completion of the Sydney Harbour Bridge in 1932. This led to the commencement of the development of suburbs on the North Shore.

Four of the five local government areas that form the Lower North Shore (the City of Willoughby and the municipalities of Mosman, Lane Cove and North Sydney) were created from the Parish of Willoughby, a cadastral unit used for land titles that was created in the early years of European settlement. "North Sydney" was formerly known as St. Leonards.

== Geography ==
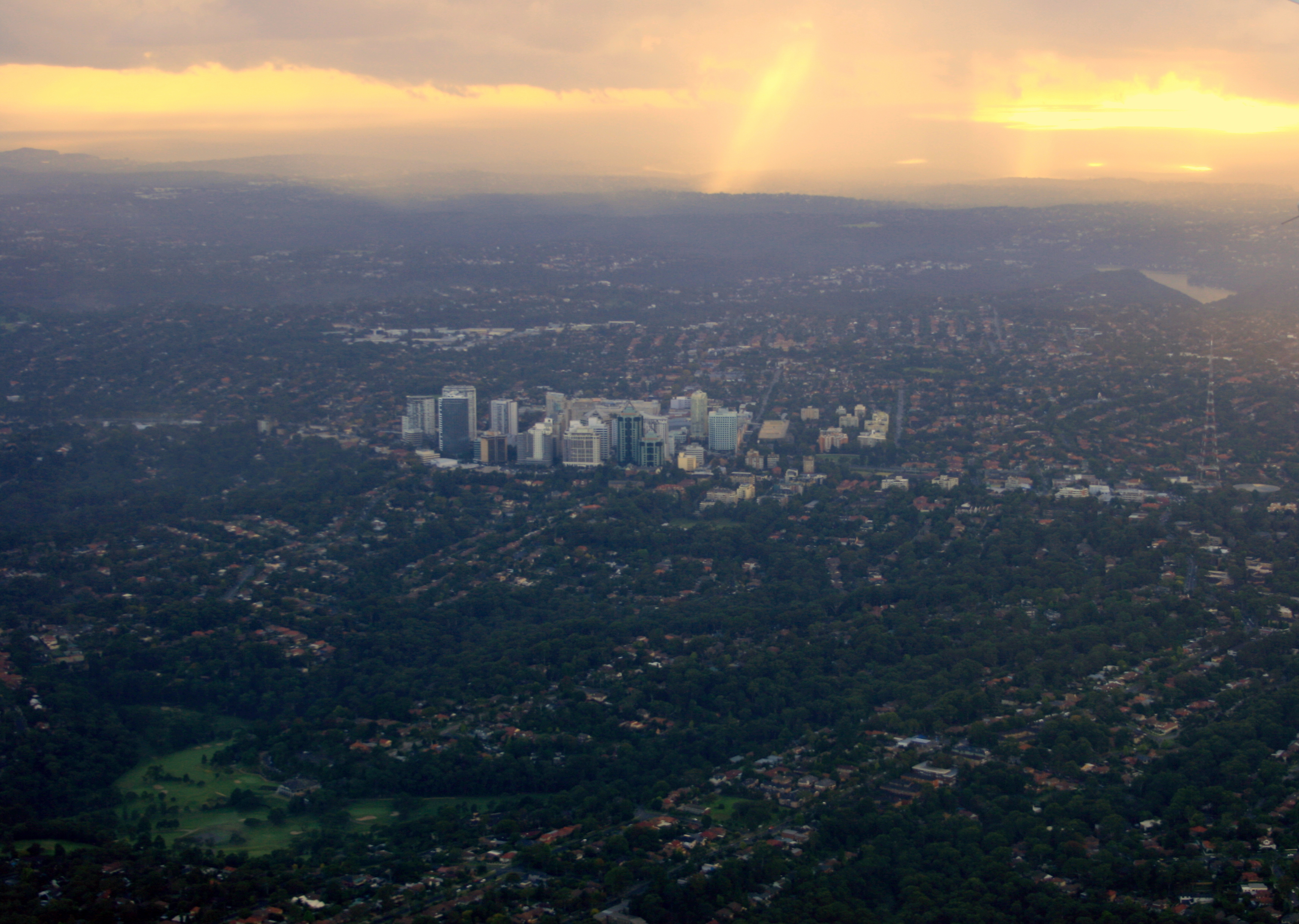
The suburb of Chatswood is a regional administrative and shopping district in the North Shore

The "North Shore" is a term used to describe a region of Northern Sydney. It is a customary term, not administrative or legal, and its boundaries are not definitive. Generally, the "North Shore" includes the peninsula north of Sydney Harbour and is bounded in the west by the Lane Cove River and National Park, in the north west by the M1 motorway to Newcastle, in the southeast by Middle Harbour, and in the northeast by Ku-ring-gai Chase National Park. East and north of this boundary are the Northern Beaches region and to the west is the general Northern Sydney region.

Local government areas within the North Shore include City of Willoughby, Municipality of Lane Cove, North Sydney Council, Municipality of Mosman, Ku-ring-gai Council, Municipality of Hunter's Hill, and some suburbs of City of Ryde and Hornsby Shire.

In this conception, the North Shore roughly corresponds with the cadastral parishes (used for land title purposes) of the Willoughby (in the south) and Gordon (in the north).

However, these boundaries are not fixed, and those suburbs that sit close to the boundary between, for example, the cadastral Parish of Gordon and the neighbouring Parish of Manly Cove in the east, may be identified in different contexts as part of either the Upper North Shore region or the Northern Beaches region. The entirety of the Lane Cove National Park and its adjoining suburbs to the north are generally regarded as part of the North Shore region, such as the suburbs of Thornleigh, Pennant Hills and Beecroft. Likewise, while the Municipality of Hunters Hill is west of the Lane Cove River and in the Parish of Hunters Hill, the suburbs in that parish along the northern shore of the Parramatta River are sometimes referred (especially in commercial contexts) as part of the Lower North Shore.

Most of the North Shore suburbs are part of the Hornsby Plateau, a large sandstone plateau overlaid by a system of ridges and gullies. The Plateau begins north of the Port Jackson and runs up until the Hawkesbury River. Thus much of the North Shore is hilly with many steep valleys running down into the harbour and the rivers on either side.

Parks and areas of sclerophyll forest are present throughout the area. The Lane Cove National Park, Garigal National Park and Sydney Harbour National Park contain remnant bushland along the Lane Cove River, Middle Harbour and Sydney Harbour respectively. Bushwalking, abseiling and bouldering opportunities can be found around Lindfield and North Turramurra. Gordon has one of Sydney's largest bat colonies in a bat reserve leading to Middle Harbour.

=== Upper North Shore ===
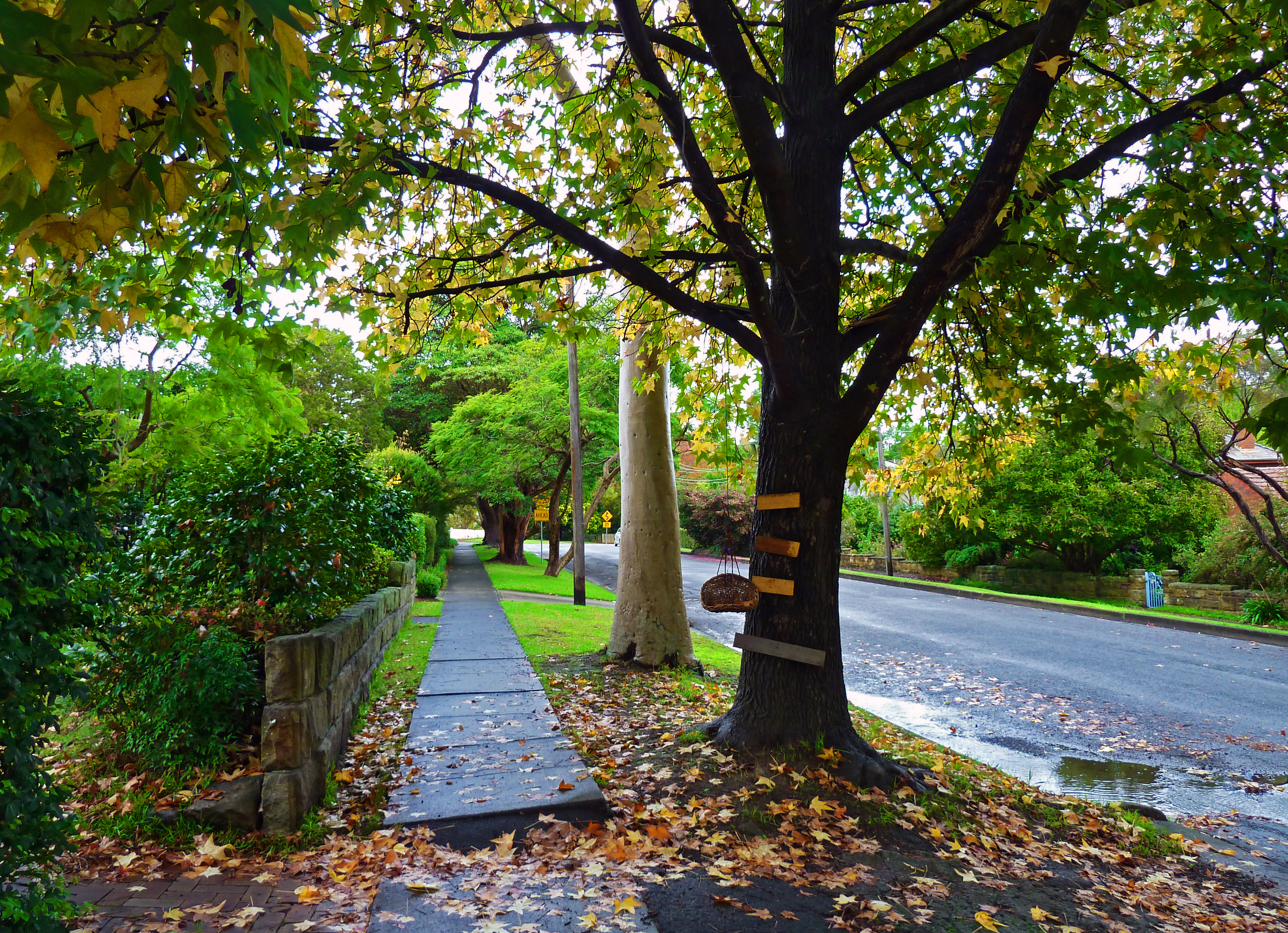
Suburban street in Lindfield, a suburb of the Upper North Shore

The "Upper North Shore" usually refers to all suburbs within the local government area of Ku-ring-gai, and a small area of Hornsby Shire, situated between Lane Cove National Park and Ku-ring-gai National Park, or suburbs between Boundary Street, Roseville and the M1 Motorway in Wahroonga. It is located to the north-west of the Sydney CBD. It roughly corresponds with the cadastral Parish of Gordon. Sometimes, all suburbs adjoining the upper section of Lane Cove National Park are considered part of the Upper North Shore.

According to Australian Bureau of Statistics data collected from the Australian census of 2016, the local government area of Ku-ring-gai Council, which makes up almost the entirety of the Upper North Shore region, is the wealthiest local government area in Australia.

In 2015, the NSW government proposed merging Ku-ring-gai Council and Hornsby Council. In July 2017, the Berejiklian government decided to abandon the forced merger of the Hornsby and Ku-ring-gai local government areas, along with several other proposed forced mergers on the North Shore following backlash from members of the community and court proceedings.

=== Lower North Shore ===
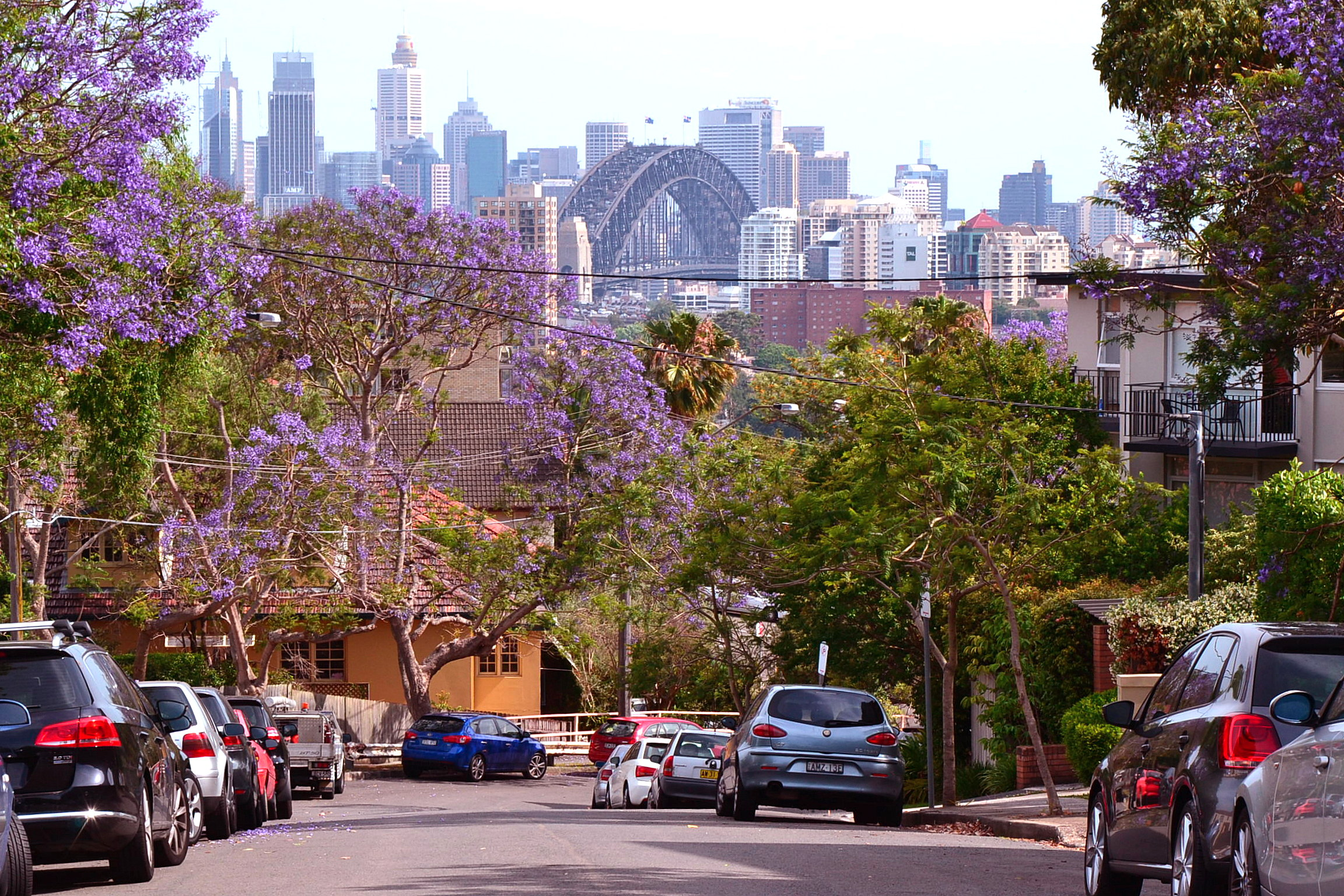
Suburban street in Neutral Bay, a suburb of the Lower North Shore

The "Lower North Shore" usually refers to the land that is located to the north of the Sydney Harbour Bridge, between Lane Cove River and Middle Harbour and as far north as Boundary Street, Roseville, or all suburbs within the local government areas of Mosman Council, City of Willoughby, Municipality of Lane Cove, North Sydney Council, Municipality of Hunter's Hill and some suburbs of City of Ryde. The Lower North Shore roughly corresponds with the Parish of Willoughby, a cadastral unit used for land title purposes. When the regional name is used in a wider sense, the suburbs of Hunters Hill, Gladesville, Woolwich and Huntleys Point, which lie west of the Lane Cove River, are sometimes also considered part of the Lower North Shore, although more often the term North Shore applies to the suburbs between Middle Harbour and the Lane Cove River.

In 2016, the NSW government proposed merging three of the four lower north shore councils (Mosman, Willoughby, and North Sydney councils). In July 2017, the Berejiklian government decided to abandon the forced merger of the North Sydney, Willoughby and Mosman local government areas. The other lower north shore council, Lane Cove, was similarly proposed to be merged with nearby Hunters Hill and Ryde councils, but that plan was also eventually abandoned.

The Lower North Shore suburbs adjacent to Sydney Harbour include Mosman, Cremorne Point, Neutral Bay, Kirribilli, Milsons Point, Lavender Bay, McMahons Point, Waverton, Wollstonecraft, Woolwich and Greenwich.

Port Jackson, including the Parramatta River, Lane Cove River, Sydney Harbour, and Middle Harbour, defines the region's southernmost extent.

== Transport ==
The main road routes on the North Shore are Military Road, the Pacific Highway, the Warringah Expressway as well as parts of the Pennant Hills Road, Ryde Road, Epping Road and Mona Vale Road. Smaller but major arterial roads on the Upper North Shore include the Eastern Arterial Road/Archbold Road at St Ives, East Killara and East Lindfield, the Comenarra Parkway at Thornleigh, Wahroonga, Turramurra, South Turramurra and West Pymble, as well as Lady Game Drive at West Pymble, Gordon, Killara, Lindfield and West Chastwood, providing access to major commercial hubs such as Chatswood.

Much of the North Shore is accessible to railway transport with the North Shore railway line providing rail services between the Sydney central business district, North Sydney and Hornsby via Chatswood. The Sydney Metro Northwest serves the suburbs of Chatswood, North Ryde, Macquarie Park, Macquarie University and Epping before continuing to Tallawong in the Hills District, replacing the previous Epping to Chatswood railway line after almost 10 years of service. The remaining Sydney Metro City & Southwest serves the Lower North Shore continuing through the Sydney central business district to Sydenham, with the line's further extension to Bankstown expected to be completed in 2026. The completed metro line will provide rapid transit between North West Sydney and South West Sydney via the Lower North Shore.

Many bus routes also serve the area, particularly the lower North Shore, and ferries connect many of the harbourside suburbs with Circular Quay in the central business district. CDC NSW provide frequent bus services to the Upper North Shore. Buses on the Lower North Shore are mainly operated by the Busways out of Willoughby Bus Depot.

== Commercial areas ==
Significant commercial and retail centres on the North Shore include North Sydney, Crows Nest, Chatswood, St Leonards, Neutral Bay, St Ives and Hornsby.

The North Shore's largest commercial centres are at North Sydney and Chatswood. A number of international companies have their Australian or Asia–Pacific Headquarters in this part of Sydney. North Sydney does not have any of Sydney's major shopping centres, however, it has a number of speciality stores and cafés. Chatswood is one of the largest retail precincts in Sydney, and has a large amount of high-density residential buildings. It is home to large shopping centres such as Westfield Chatswood and Chatswood Chase. Adjacent to Lane Cove National Park, Macquarie Park is home to one of Sydney's largest shopping centres, Macquarie Centre. Macquarie Park also has a substantial amount of high density residential buildings and office space. St Leonards is another large commercial area featuring mostly office space and apartments.

== Attractions ==
The Lower North Shore has many unique landmarks such as: the Sydney Harbour Bridge, Taronga Zoo in Mosman, Admiralty House (Sydney residence of the Governor-General of Australia), Kirribilli House (Sydney residence of the Prime Minister of Australia), Luna Park, and Balmoral Beach. At a Sydney or local level, however, landmarks are more plentiful and include: the Lane Cove Azalea Beds, Blues Point Tower, Eden Gardens, the Balmoral Rotunda, the Stanton Library in North Sydney, Lane Cove Plaza, Zenith Towers at Chatswood, Northpoint Tower in North Sydney, Cammeray suspension bridge at Cammeray, Echo Point Park in Roseville Chase, the Royal North Shore Hospital, the Hornsby Water Clock, and 'The Forum' in St Leonards.

The region is home to hundreds of parks and reserves, including Sydney Harbour National Park and the Lane Cove National Park. Major local sports grounds include North Sydney Oval, the region's largest in capacity, and Chatswood Oval.

== Events and celebrations ==
The North Shore holds a number of festivals/events throughout the year, including: Tartan Day at Lane Cove, the Guringgai Festival honouring northern Sydney's Aboriginal people, the Moocooboola Festival at Hunters Hill, the Mosman Festival, Lane Cove's Cammeraygal Festival, and Chinese New Year at Chatswood. Mosman, North Sydney, Willoughby also hold an annual art prize. All local government areas in the region and around the country celebrate Australia Day, which is on 26 January.

The Willoughby Spring Festival is held throughout the Willoughby local government area, in September each year. The festival lasts for a month and features over 40 events including live music/entertainment, exhibitions, cultural celebrations, business events and many more community activities. The highlight is the annual Willoughby Street Fair where the Chatswood CBD is taken over by market stalls, performers, dancers and musicians. The StreetFair features the Willoughby Street Parade which included over 1,000 participants in 2007.

== Media ==
The local newspapers are the Sydney Observer, Hornsby and Upper North Shore Advocate, The North Shore Times, The Mosman Daily, Northern District Times and the North Shores' local lifestyle publication Northside.

== Sport ==
The North Shore is represented by Rugby League club, the North Sydney Bears, officially the North Sydney District Rugby League Football Club. The Bears are the only team in the Sydney Metropolitan Area without NRL representation to have a Junior Rugby League District. There have been on going efforts to return the Bears to the top flight, either as the Central Coast Bears, in Perth, or as simply "Bears". In Rugby union, the area is represented in the Shute Shield by the Northern Suburbs Rugby Club, and the Gordon Rugby Football Club. In the NSW Premier Cricket, the North Shore is represented by the Gordon District Cricket Club who play home games at Chatswood Oval, the Mosman Cricket Club who play home games at Allan Border Oval in Mosman, the Northern District Cricket Club who play home games at Mark Taylor Oval in Waitara, and UTS North Sydney Cricket Club who play home games at North Sydney Oval.

== Politics ==
Throughout history and on all three levels of politics (federal, state and local), the North Shore has been a stronghold for the Liberal Party, the main centre-right, liberal conservative party in Australia. However, in recent years, teal independents (centrist or centre-left independents who are economically liberal, but environmentally and socially progressive, most of whom are women, whose campaigns are mostly funded by Climate 200, an organisation founded and headed by businessman Simon Holmes à Court that advocates for climate action) have won gained support in the area. However, on the state level, the Liberal Party has managed to hold off challenges from teal candidates. Similar trends are present in Sydney's Eastern Suburbs and on the Northern Beaches, as well as in some parts of Melbourne.

=== Federal ===
- Division of Bradfield (held by independent)
- Division of Warringah (held by independent)
- Division of Berowra (held by Liberal)
- Division of Bennelong (held by Labor)

=== State ===
- Electoral district of North Shore (Held by Liberal)
- Electoral district of Willoughby (Held by Liberal)
- Electoral district of Wahroonga (Held by Liberal)
- Electoral district of Lane Cove (Held by Liberal)
- Electoral district of Epping (Held by Liberal)
- Electoral district of Hornsby (Held by Liberal)
- Electoral district of Ryde (Held by Liberal)
- Electoral district of Davidson (Held by Liberal)

== Climate ==
Like the rest of the Sydney basin, the North Shore has a humid subtropical climate (Köppen Cfa). Turramurra receives one of the highest rainfalls in the Sydney area, with an average of 1,400 millimetres (55 in) per year. The inland parts of the North Shore are somewhat cooler than other areas of the surrounding Sydney basin in the winter months, particularly the CBD, and the further inland the area (particularly the Upper North Shore), the cooler the weather.

== List of suburbs ==
This list is not exhaustive. The North Shore is not strictly defined by government authorities.

The suburbs and localities of the region generally known as North Shore are:

=== Upper North Shore ===
- Asquith
- Berowra
- Berowra Heights
- East Killara
- East Lindfield
- Gordon
- Hornsby
- Hornsby Heights
- Killara
- Lindfield
- Mount Colah
- Mount Ku-ring-gai
- Normanhurst
- North Turramurra
- North Wahroonga
- Pymble
- Roseville
- Roseville Chase
- St Ives
- St Ives Chase
- South Turramurra
- Turramurra
- Wahroonga
- Waitara
- Warrawee
- West Pymble

=== Lower North Shore ===
- Artarmon
- Cammeray
- Castle Cove
- Castlecrag
- Chatswood
- Chatswood West
- Cremorne
- Cremorne Point
- Crows Nest
- Gladesville
- Greenwich
- Hunters Hill
- Kirribilli
- Lane Cove
- Lane Cove North
- Lane Cove West
- Lavender Bay
- Longueville
- McMahons Point
- Middle Cove
- Milsons Point
- Mosman
- Naremburn
- Neutral Bay
- North Ryde
- North Sydney
- North Willoughby
- Northbridge
- Northwood
- Riverview
- St Leonards
- Waverton
- Willoughby
- Willoughby East
- Woolwich
- Wollstonecraft
