= Parish of St Philip =

Coordinates: 33°51′51″S 151°12′22″E

St Philip
- Cadastral division
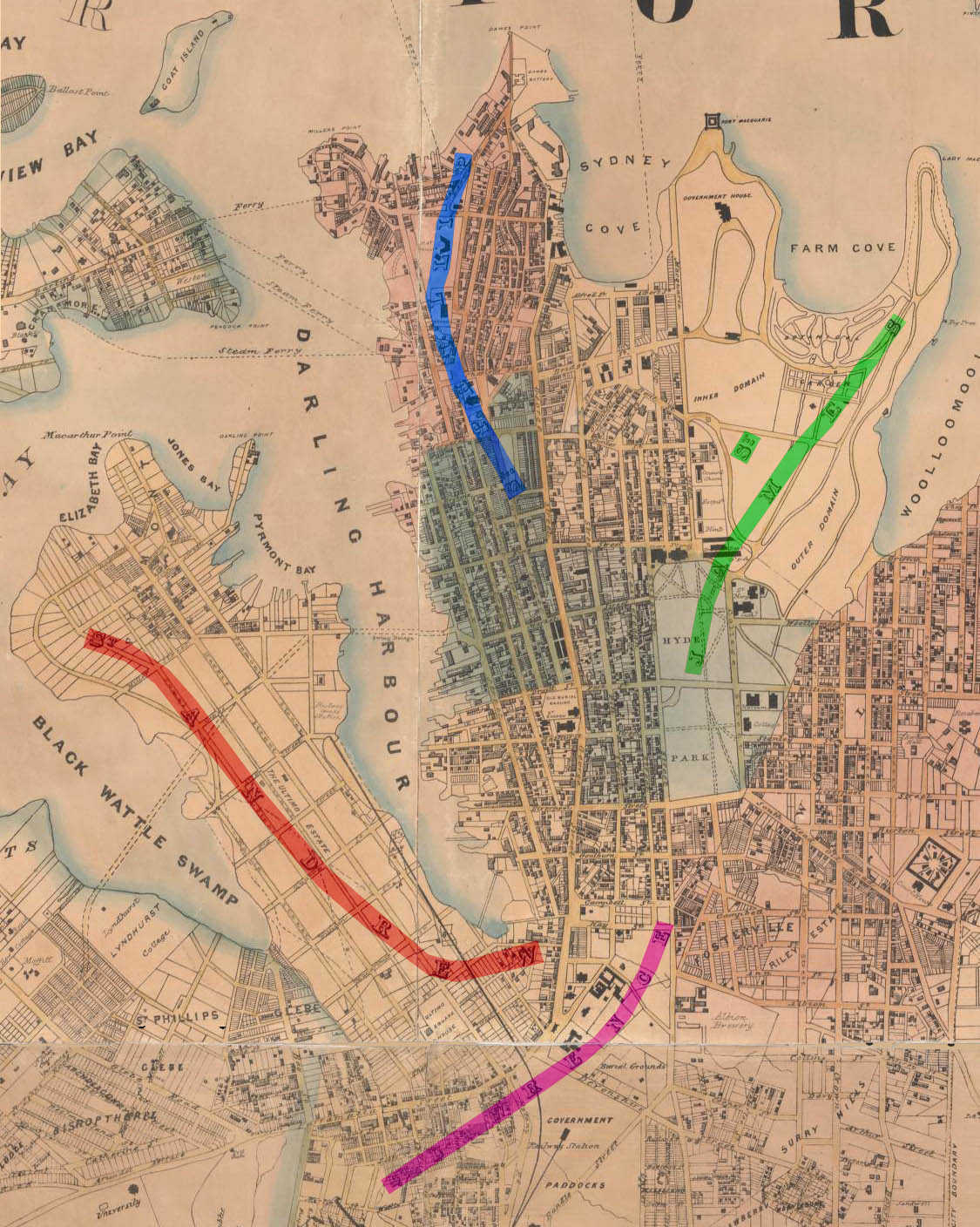
- Location in Sydney city highlighted in blue
- Country: Australia
- State: New South Wales
- LGA: City of Sydney
- Established: 1835
- County: Cumberland
- Hundred (former): Sydney
Lands administrative divisions around St Philip
Willoughby	Willoughby	Willoughby
Petersham	St Philip	St James
St Andrew	St Andrew	St James

St Philip Parish is one of the 57 parishes of Cumberland County, New South Wales, a cadastral division formerly used for the administration of land titles. It is located on the western side of the original settlement at Sydney Cove, to the west of the Tank Stream. It is one of the four small parishes in the Sydney city centre (together with St Andrew, St Lawrence and St James) and is named after the church of St Philip's. It includes the southern end of the Sydney Harbour Bridge, The Rocks, Dawes Point and Millers Point. It is bounded by Sydney Harbour to the north, King Street to the south, George Street to the south-east, and what was once the Tank Stream to the east (now near a small part of Hunter Street, Milton street and part of Pitt Street in the east, near but not including Circular Quay). The northern end of Darling Harbour forms the boundary in the west. It includes Wynyard railway station.

== Locations ==
Images of locations in the Parish of St Philip:

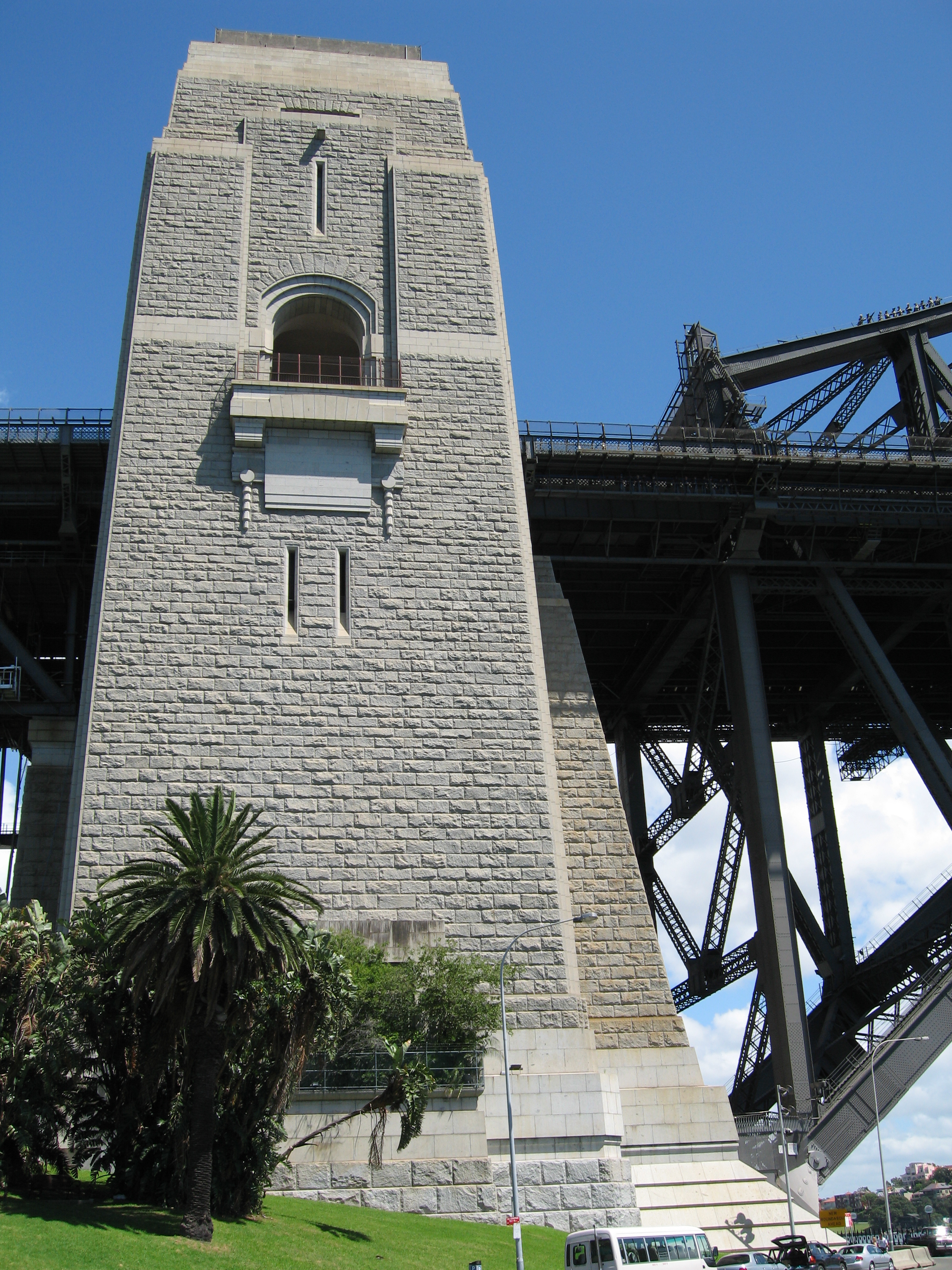
The Dawes Point (southern) end of the Sydney Harbour Bridge

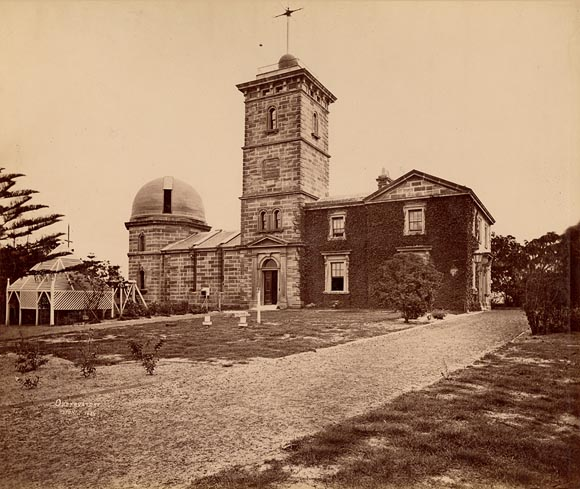
Sydney Observatory

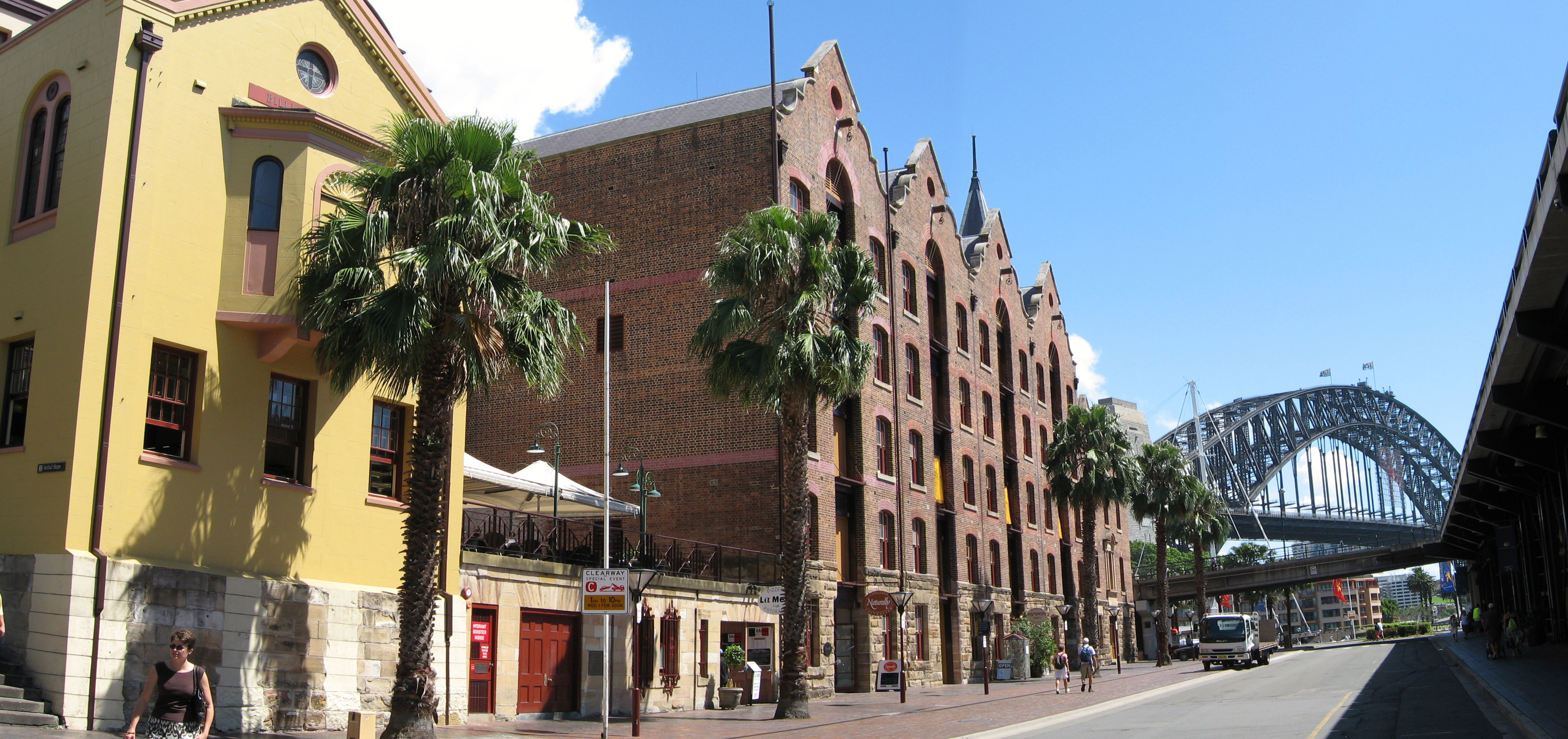
The Rocks

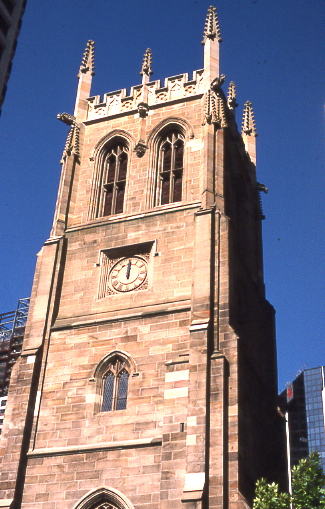
The tower of St Philip's Church, Sydney, (1848–58)

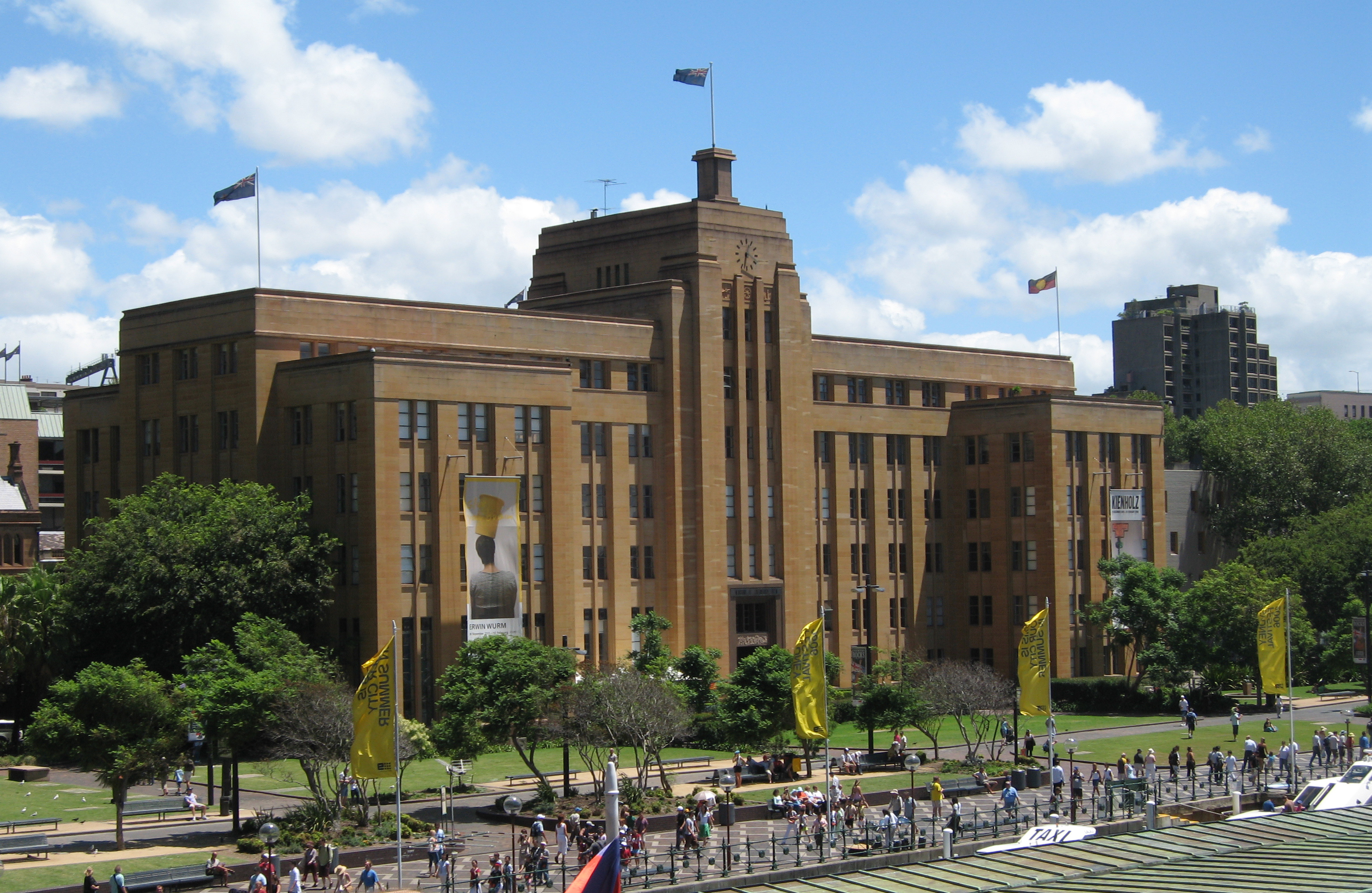
Museum of Contemporary Art on the eastern end of the parish.

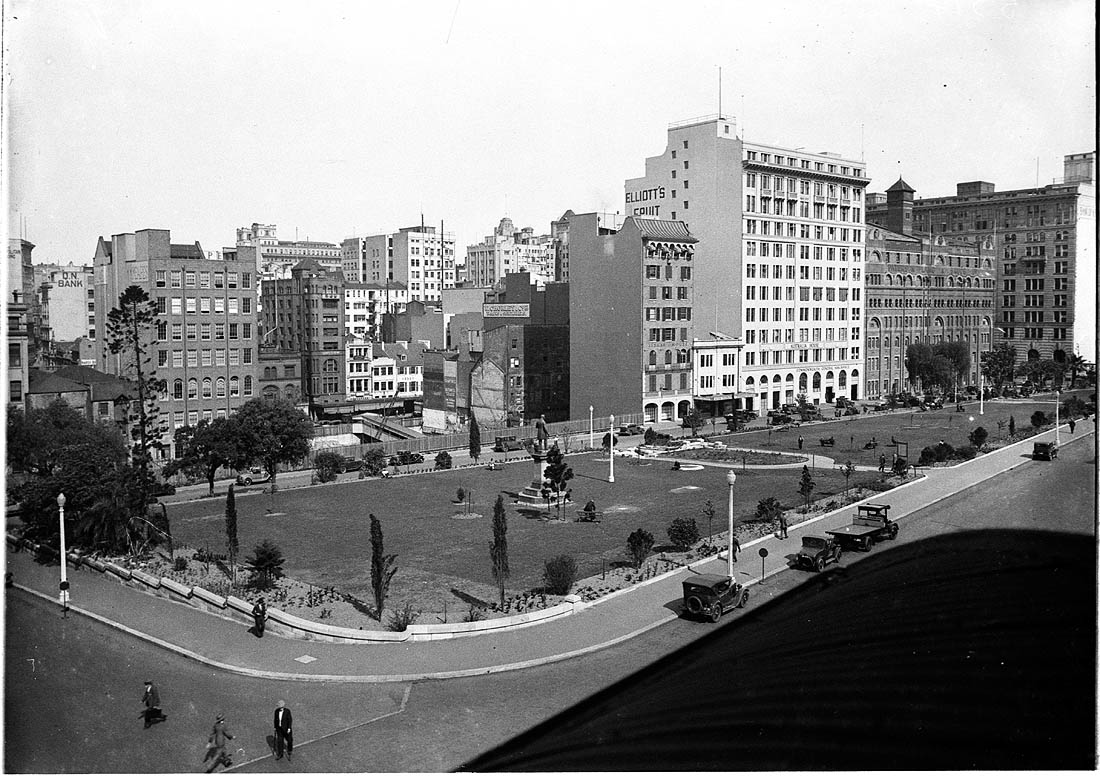
Wynyard Park and the block behind it is in the Parish of Philip, with the buildings in the distance in St James

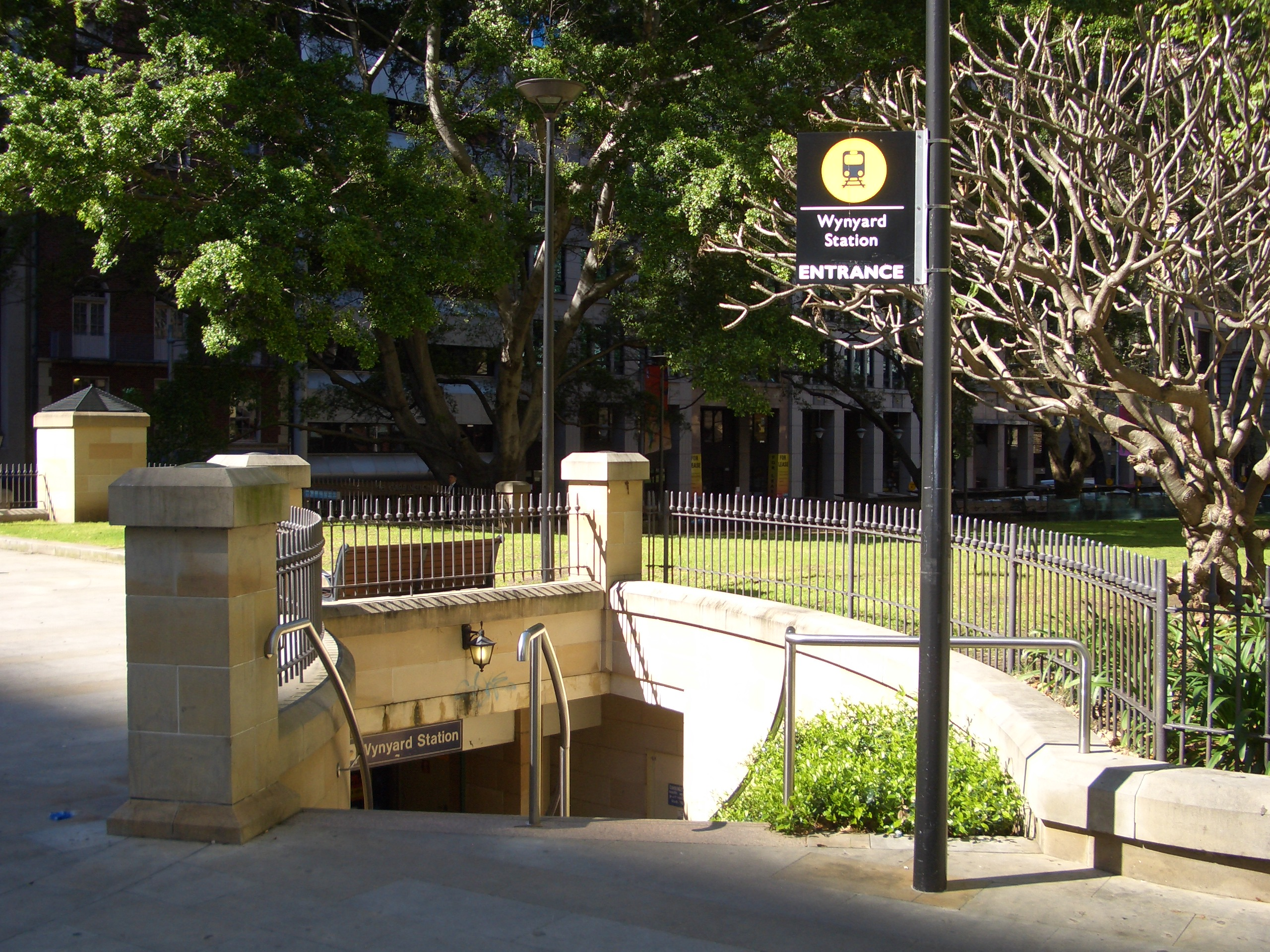
Wynyard station
