= Parish of North Colah =

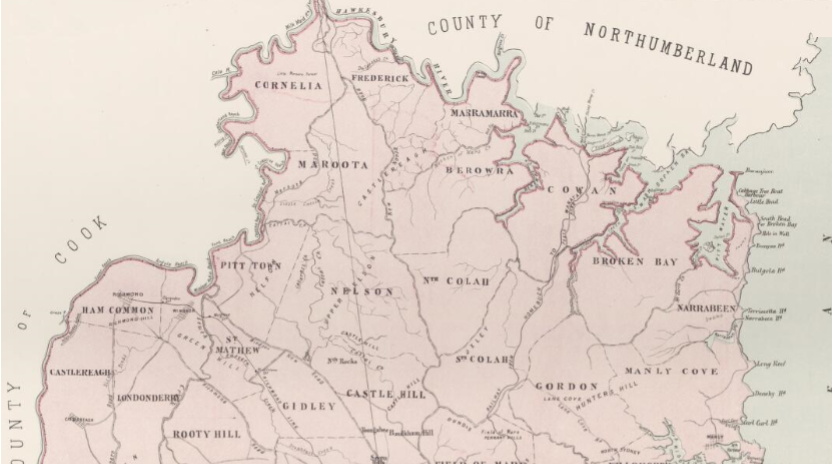
Map showing the Parish of Cowan, 1886.

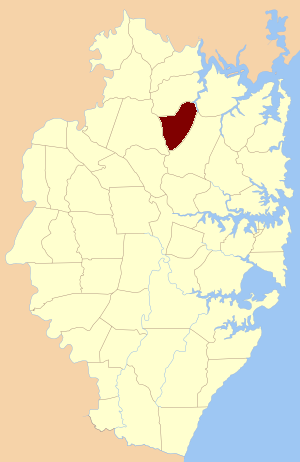
Parish of North Colah.

The Parish of North Colah is a civil parish of the County of Cumberland, New South Wales, Australia.

The Parish is in the Hundred of Dundas and Hornsby Shire Council. Much of the parish is National Park, the main town of the parish is Mount Colah, and the Sydney to Newcastle Freeway and Central Coast and Sydney to Newcastle Railway Lines pass through the Parish.
