= Parish of St Peter =

Coordinates: 34°03′S 150°49′E

St Peter
- Cadastral division
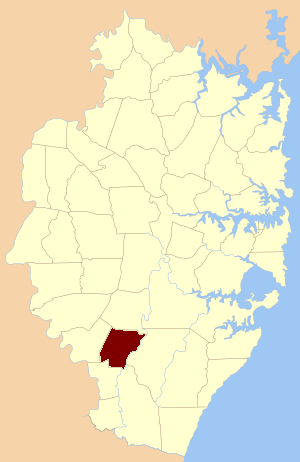
- Location of the parish within Cumberland
- Country: Australia
- State: New South Wales
- LGA: City of Campbelltown
- Established: 1835
- County: Cumberland
- Hundred (former): Campbelltown
Lands administrative divisions around St Peter
Narellan	Minto	Holsworthy
Narellan	St Peter	Eckersley
Manangle	Wedderburn	Eckersley

St Peter Parish is one of the 57 parishes of Cumberland County, New South Wales, a cadastral unit for use on land titles. Its eastern boundary is the Georges River. It is named after St Peters Anglican church, the oldest building in Campbelltown.
