= Parish of Nelson (Cumberland County) =

Parish of Nelson, is a civil parish of the County of Cumberland, north west of Sydney, Australia.

It is in the Land District of Windsor, and the parish is centered on the suburbs of Nelson, New South Wales, and Box Hill, New South Wales.

The parish is one of the oldest cadasteral divisions in Australia.

The dominant land use of the area is rural allotments; however, in 2017 the district was released of residential purposes and it is expected the within a few years the parish will be added to the urban sprawl of Western Sydney.

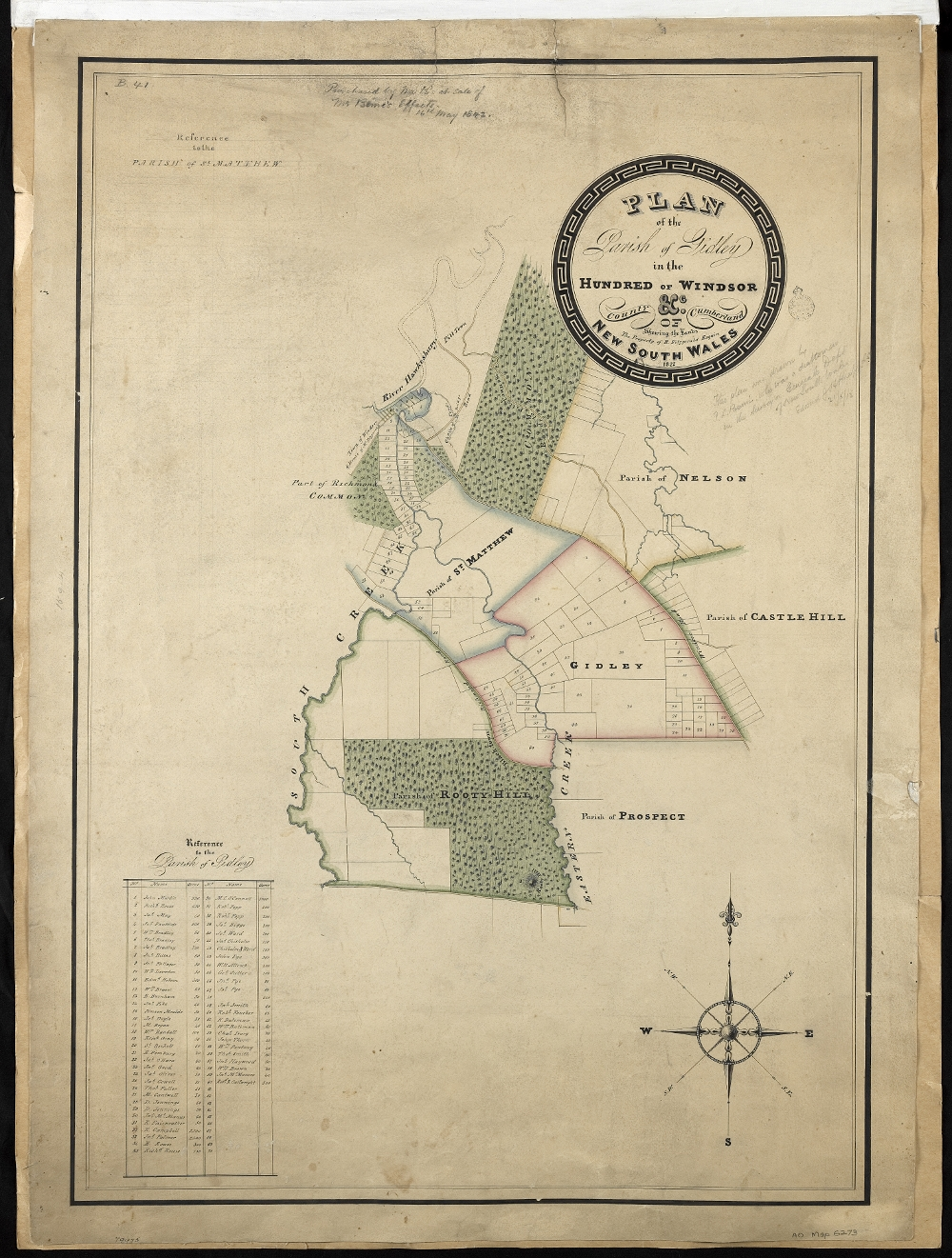
Map of the Parish of Nelson, 1822.

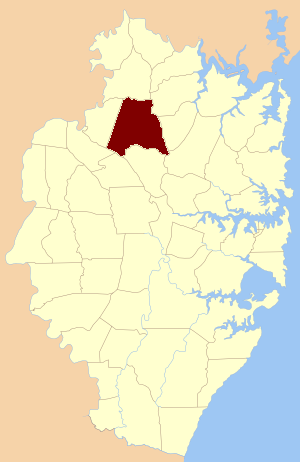
Nelson Parish Cumberland county.

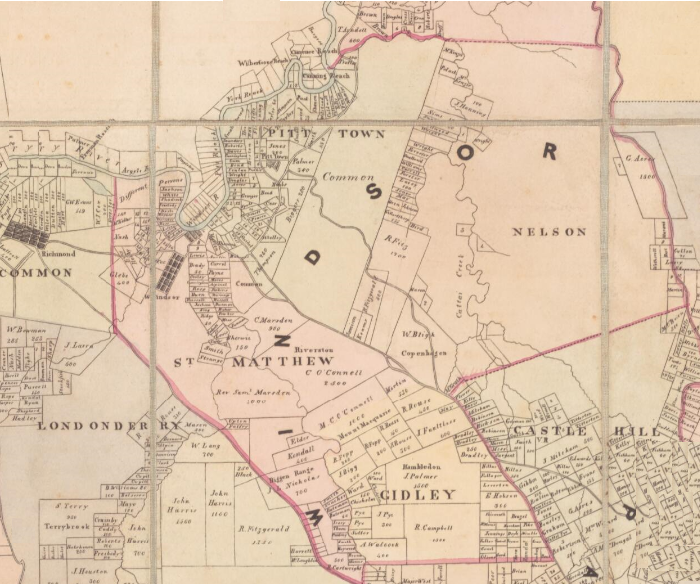
Map of the Parish in Windsor.
