= Parish of Willoughby =

Coordinates: 33°49′54″S 151°15′04″E

Willoughby
- Cadastral division
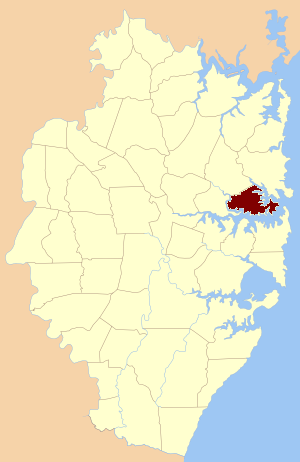
- Location of the parish within Cumberland
- Country: Australia
- State: New South Wales
- LGA: Lane Cove Council Municipality of Mosman North Sydney Council City of Willoughby
- Established: 1835
- County: Cumberland
- Hundred (former): Packenham
Lands administrative divisions around Willoughby
Gordon	Gordon	Manly Cove
Hunters Hill	Willoughby	Pacific Ocean
Concord	Petersham	Alexandria

Willoughby Parish, Cumberland is one of the 57 parishes of Cumberland County, New South Wales, Australia, a cadastral unit for use on land titles. The suburb of Willoughby and the City of Willoughby LGA are in a similar area. Willoughby Parish roughly covers the peninsula formed by the Lane Cove River, Sydney Harbour and Middle Harbour on three sides, with the northern boundary of the Parish roughly across the narrowest point of the peninsula (where the Lane Cove River comes closest to Middle Harbour). It roughly correlates with the region traditionally known as the "Lower North Shore", although that term is also sometimes used in a wider sense that includes land in neighbouring Hunters Hill Parish.
