= Parish of Ham Common =

Parish in New South Wales

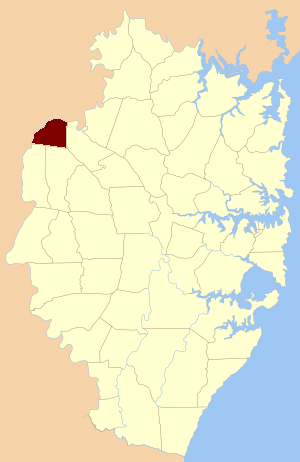
Ham common Parish Cumberland county locator.

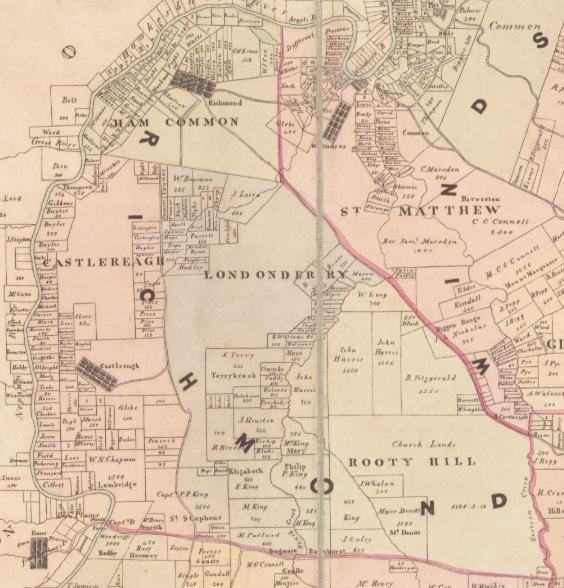
Map of the Parish in 1840.

The parish of Ham Common is one of the 57 civil parishes of the County of Cumberland, New South Wales.

The Parish of Ham Common is in the Land District of Windsor, and Hawkesbury Council. The parish is centered on the suburbs of Richmond, New South Wales and Clarendon, New South Wales on the Hawkesbury River and the foothills of the Blue Mountains.
