= Parish of Claremont (Cumberland County) =

Civil parish of the Cumberland County, New South Wales

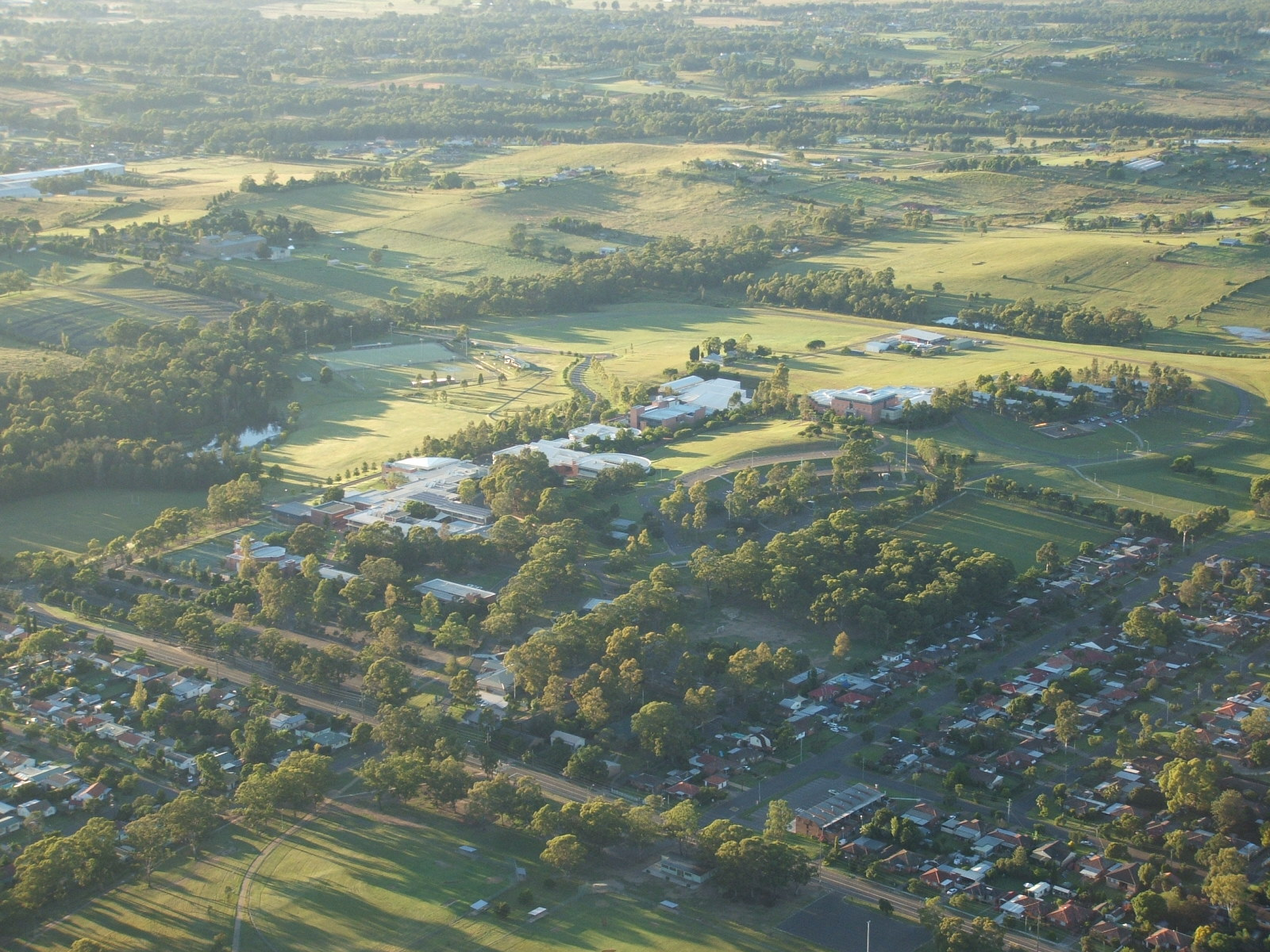
air photo of Parish of Claremont

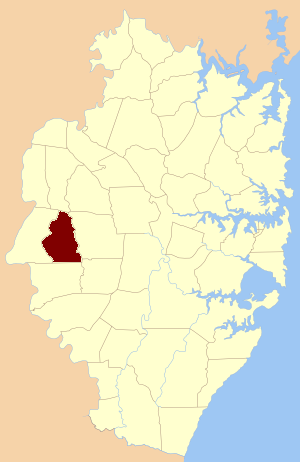
Parish of Claremont

The Parish of Claremont, is a civil parish of the Cumberland County.

It included the suburbs of St Marys, New South Wales, Kingswood, and Badgeries Creek.

The southern boundary of the parish is Orphan School Road in Fairfield, the western boundary Bringillley Road, the eastern boundary is South Creek (New South Wales), the western boundary was South Creek, New South Wales and the northern boundary was the Great Western Highway.
