= Hundred of Evan, New South Wales =

Hundred of Evan
- Cadastral division
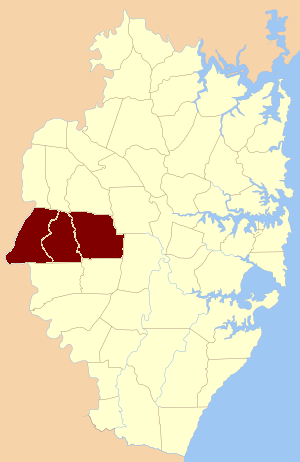
- The parishes which were part of the Hundred of Evan
- Country: Australia
- State: New South Wales
- LGA: City of Penrith
- Established: 1835
- Abolished: 1888
- County: Cumberland
Lands administrative divisions around Hundred of Evan
Blue Mountains	Richmond	Parramatta
Blue Mountains	Hundred of Evan	Parramatta & Liverpool
Blue Mountains	Bringelly	Liverpool

The Hundred of Evan was a former lands administrative division located on the western edge of Greater Sydney, corresponding approximately to the modern City of Penrith. It was one of the thirteen hundreds in the County of Cumberland, which were published in the government gazette of May 27, 1835, and repealed on January 21, 1888.

Upon its creation as a Hundred in 1835, Evan was divided into three parishes, being (from east to west) Melville, Claremont, and Mulgoa.

== Evan District ==
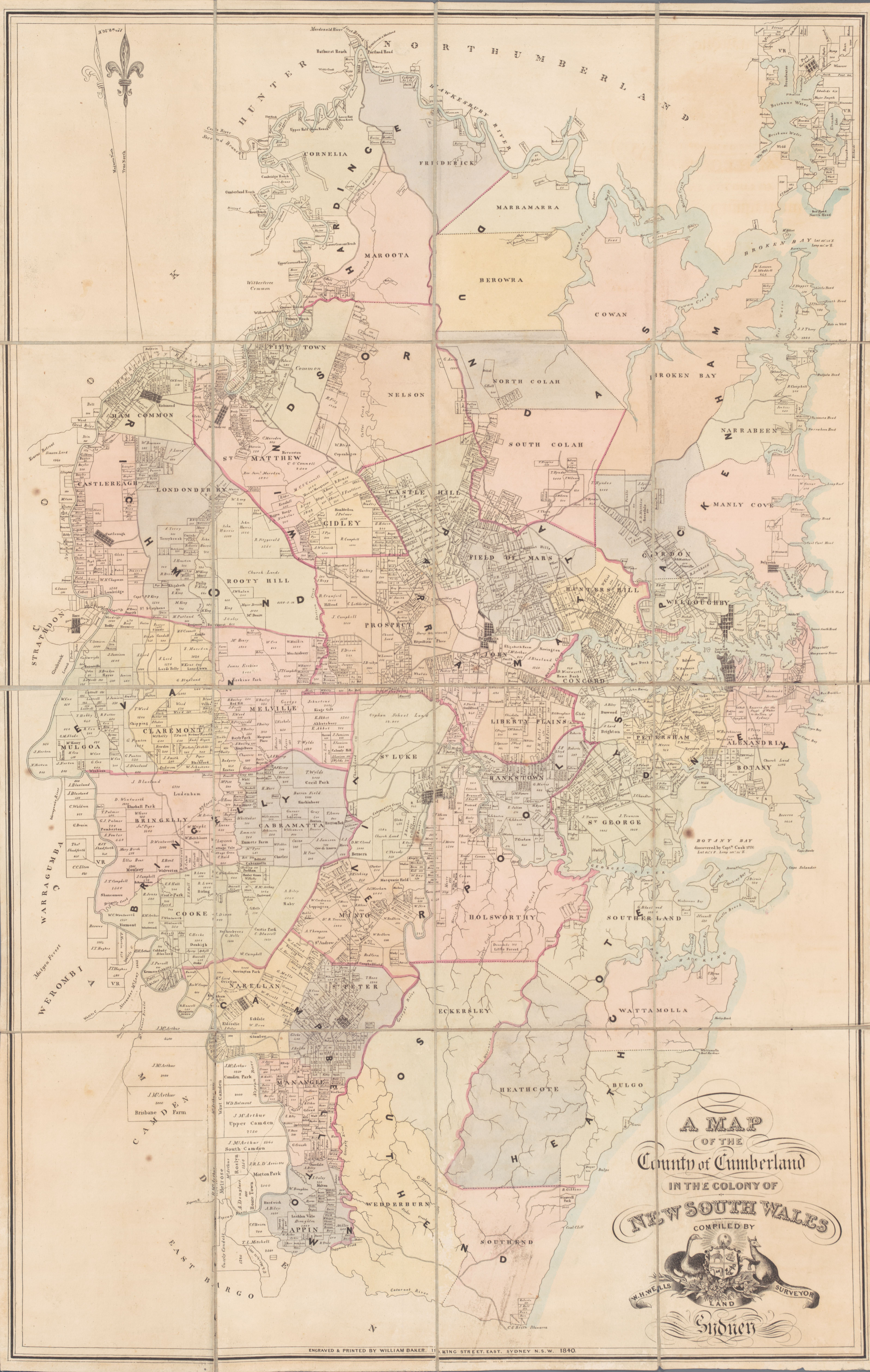
Map of Cumberland County, 1840

The area had been settled for several decades, and was originally known as the District of Evan, and was founded on the eastern side of the Nepean River. It was named in honour of Sir Evan Nepean. The earliest known newspaper reference to the Evan District dates to 1803, when the first grants of land were issued there.

Evan District's first town, Castlereagh, was one of the five Macquarie Towns, planned by Governor Macquarie in 1810.

However, over time, Castlereagh became overshadowed by the area's other significant town, Penrith, which grew up at the crossing-point of the road over the Nepean River, leading to the way over the Blue Mountains. The gradual disappearance of the district's name, Evan, was helped by its often being displaced by the more popularly used name of the nearby river, the Nepean.
