= Parish of St Matthew =

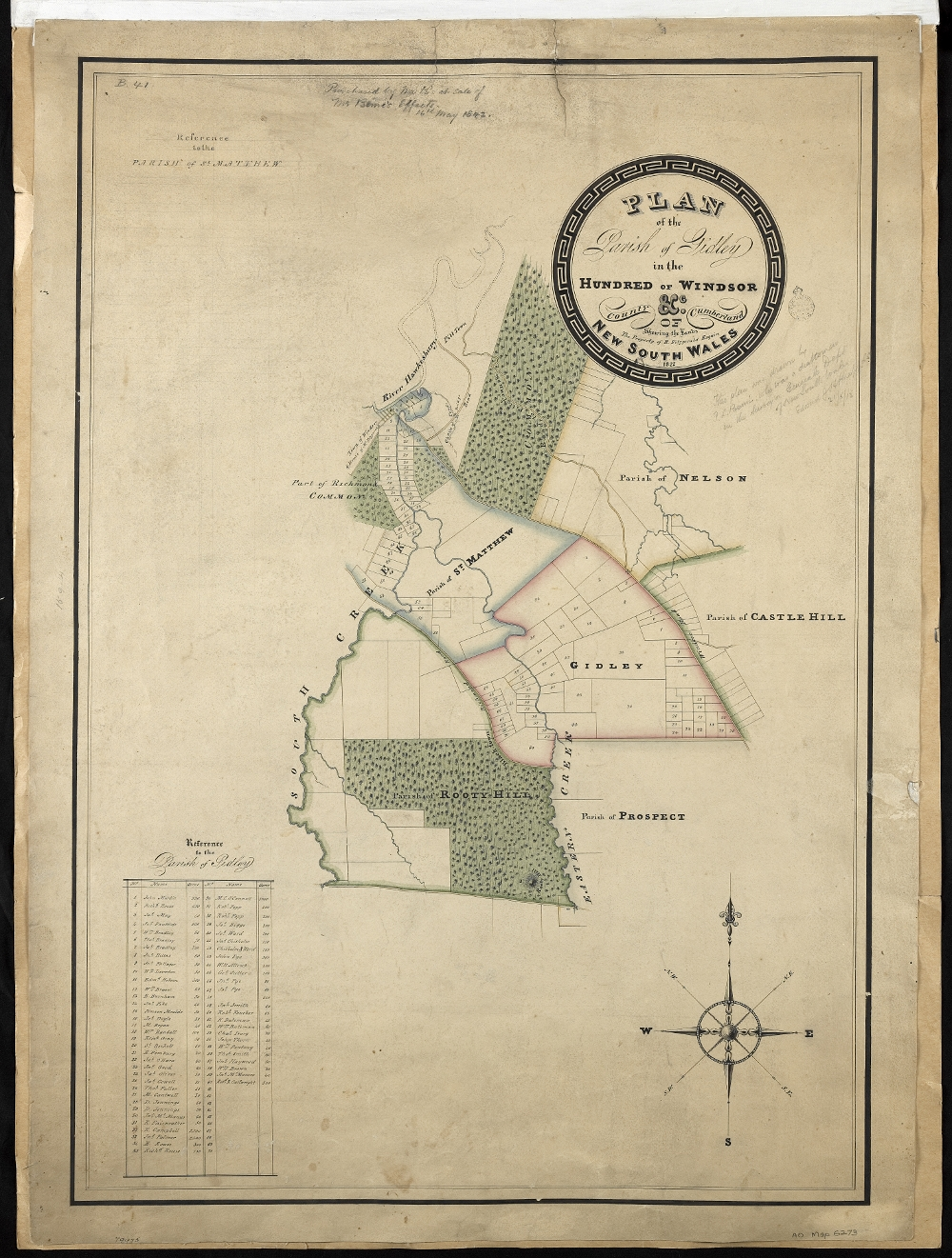
Map of the Parish of St Matthews (Australia), 1822.

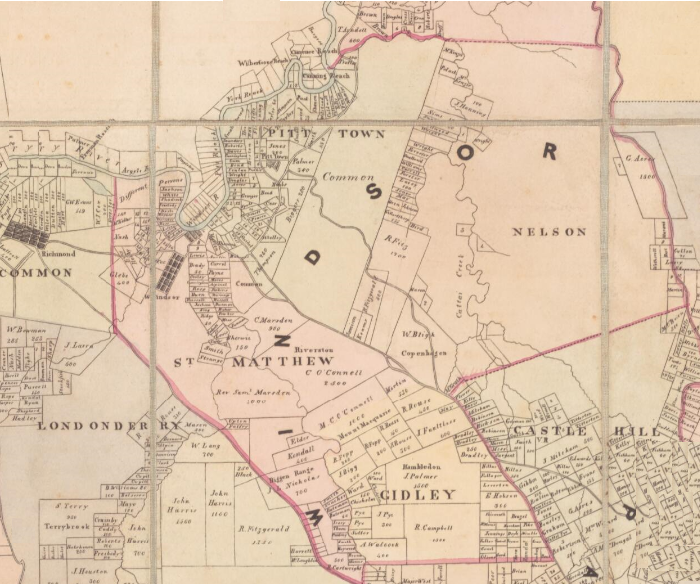
Map of the Parish in Windsor.

Parish of St Matthews, is one of the 57 civil parishes of the County of Cumberland, New South Wales.

The Parish of St Matthews is in the Land District of Windsor, and Hawkesbury City. The parish is centered on the suburbs of Vineyard and Windsor, New South Wales.

The parish is one of the oldest cadasteral divisions in Australia.
