= Parish of Rooty Hill =

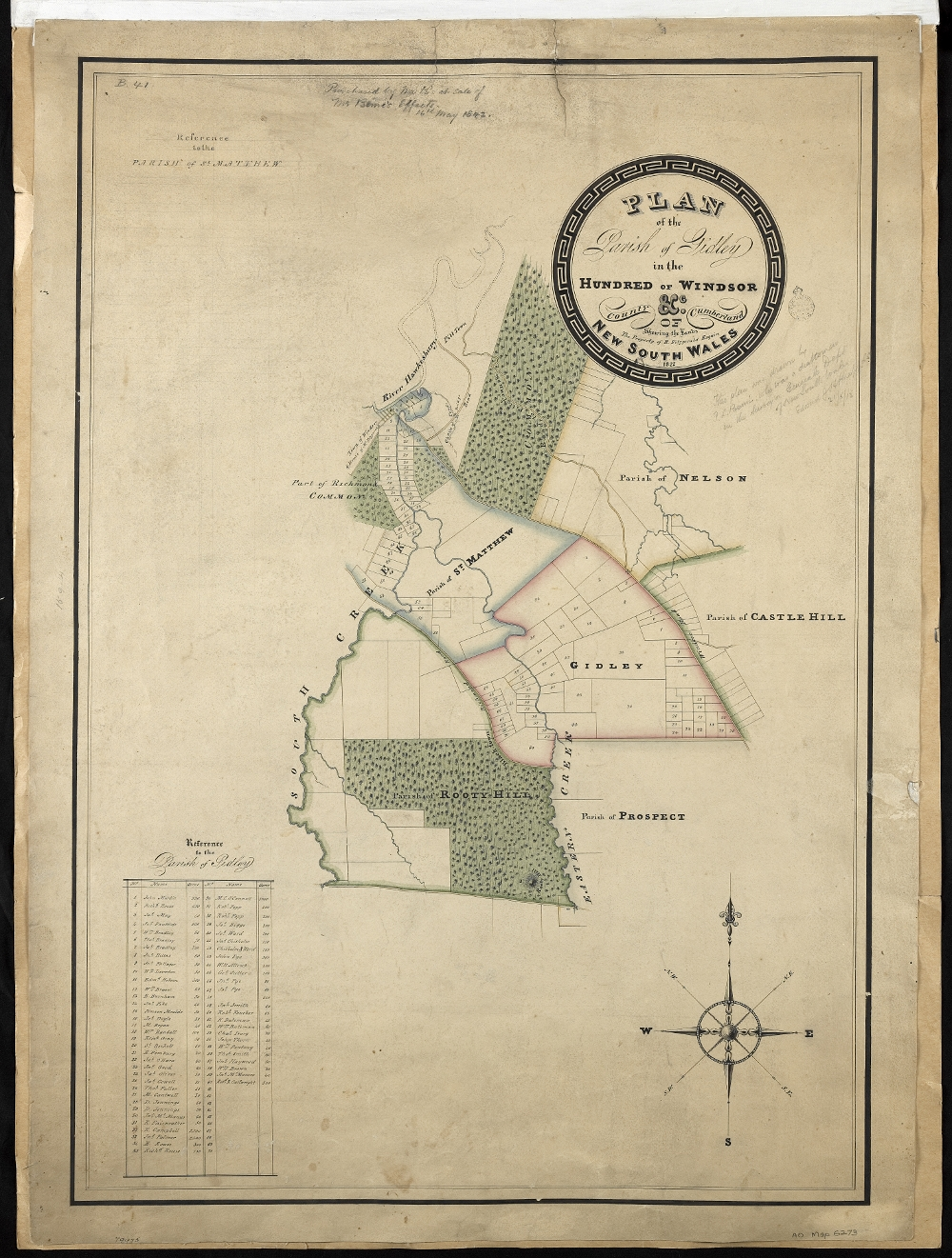
Map of the Parish of Rooty Hill, 1822.

The Parish of Rooty Hill, is a civil parish of Cumberland County in New South Wales, Australia.

The parish is centered on the suburbs of Doonside, Mount Druitt and Rooty Hill. The boundaries of the parish are Eastern and South Creeks, and Richmond railway line on the north.

The Great Western Highway and Western Railway Line transect the parish.

The parish is one of the oldest cadasteral divisions in Australia with the administrative arrangements that would eventually become the parish existing as early as 1810. The name derives from a specific hill still known as the Rooty Hill, that is near Doonside railway station known for an abundance of roots.

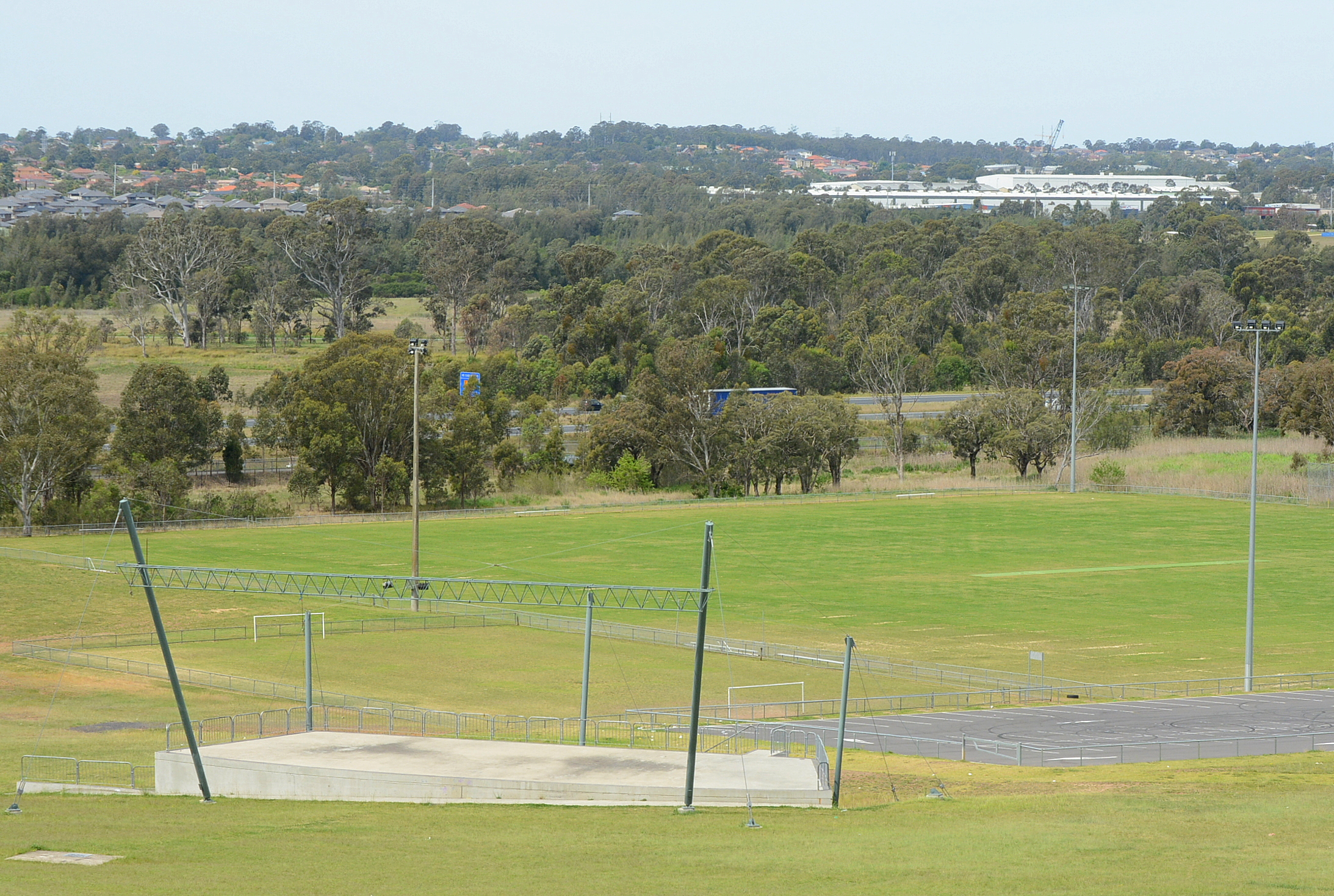
View from the Rooty Hill, Rooty Hill, Sydney, looking across Morreau Reserve

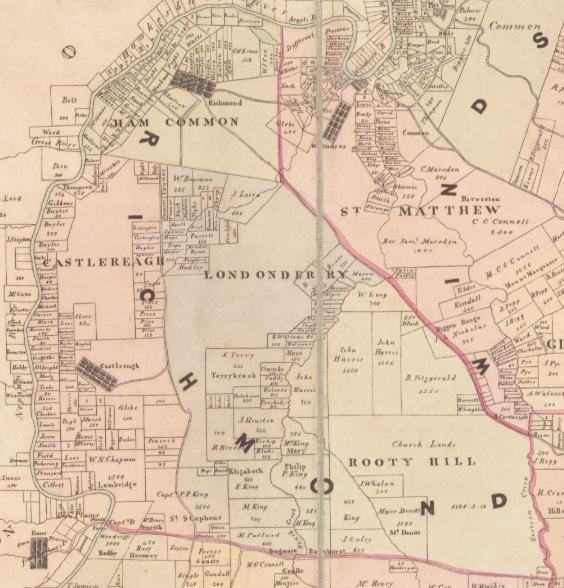
Map of the Parish in 1840.
