= Parish of Gidley =

Parish of New South Wales, Australia

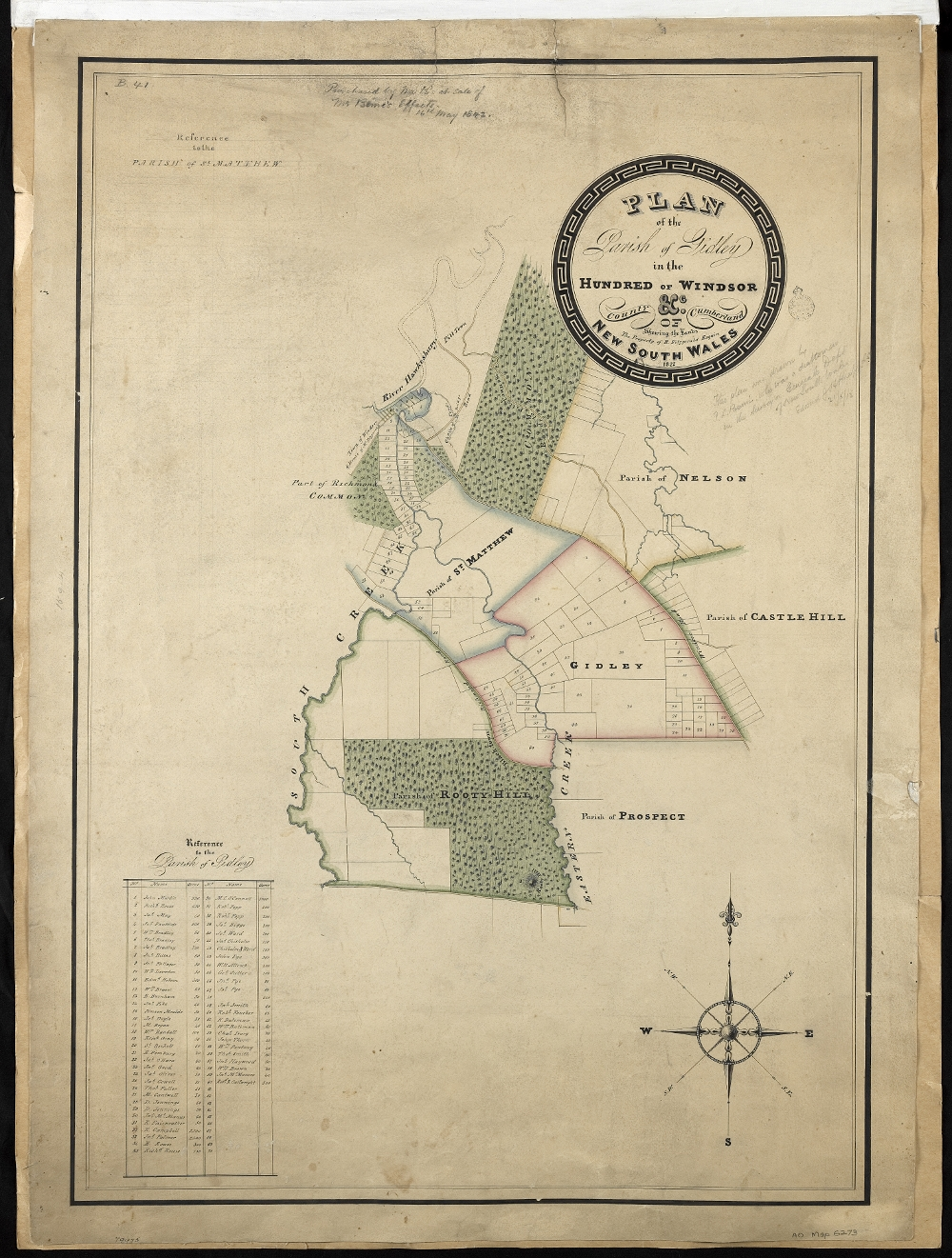
Map of the Parish of Gidley, 1822.

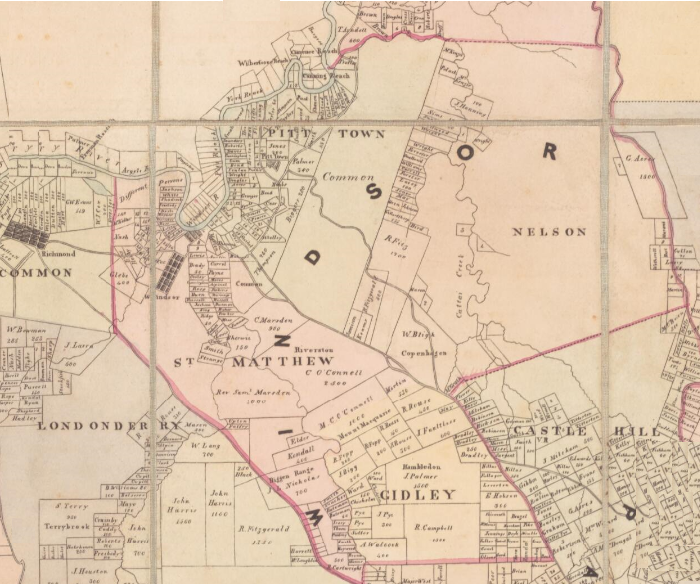
Map of the Parish in Windsor.

Parish of Gidley, is one of the 57 civil parishes of the County of Cumberland.

Parish of Gidley is in the Land District of Windsor, and Blacktown Municipality. The parish follows the Richmond Railway Line and lies between Old Windsor Road on the east and Richmond Road on the west. The Westlink M7 motorway forms the southern boundary of the parish and the parish covers the suburbs of Quakers Hill, New South Wales, Schoefeild, Riverstone and Glenwood, New South Wales.

The parish is one of the oldest cadasteral divisions in Australia. Since the introduction of the Torrens Title system in New South Wales the importance of the parish in conveyancing has been reduced somewhat.
