= Parish of Appin =

Coordinates: 34°12′S 150°46′E

Appin
- Cadastral division
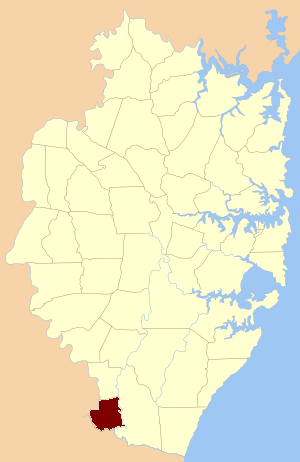
- Location of the parish within Cumberland
- Country: Australia
- State: New South Wales
- LGA: Wollondilly Shire
- Established: 1835
- County: Cumberland
- Hundred (former): Campbelltown
Lands administrative divisions around Appin
Camden (Camden)	Manangle	Wedderburn
Camden(Camden)	Appin	Wedderburn
Wilton(Camden)	Wallandoola(Camden)	Wedderburn

Appin Parish, Cumberland is one of the 57 parishes of Cumberland County, New South Wales, a cadastral unit for use on land titles. Its eastern boundary is the Georges River, and western boundary the Nepean River and Cataract River. It is centred on Appin.
