= Parish of Castlereagh =

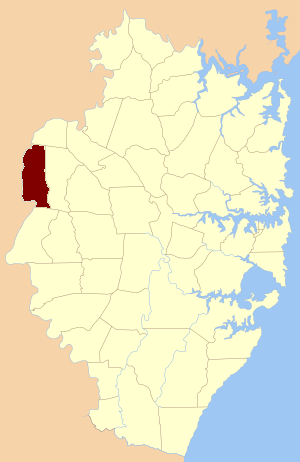
Castlereagh Parish in Cumberland county

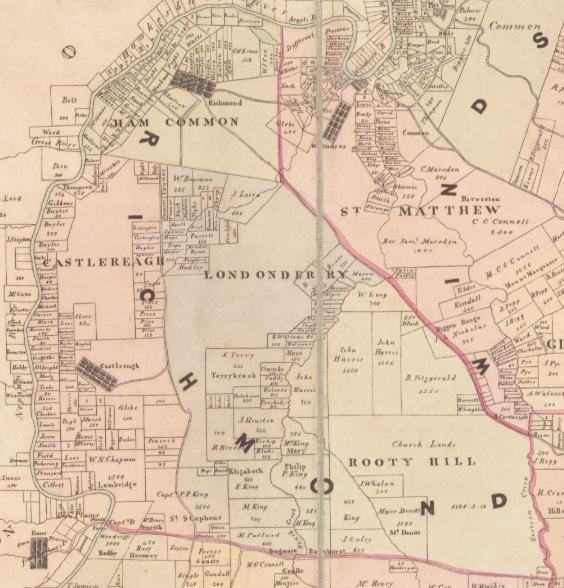
Map of the Parish in 1840.

Castlereagh Parish is a civil parish of Cumberland County, located west of Sydney in New South Wales, Australia.

The parish is on the Nepean River between Penrith, New South Wales and Richmond, New South Wales in the foothills of the Great Dividing Range.
