= Parish of Frederick =

Civil Parish in Cumberland, New South Wales

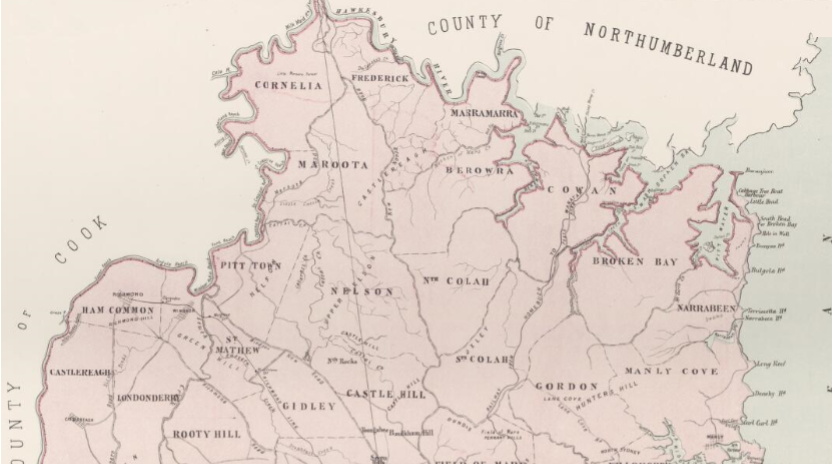
Frederick Parish in the County of Cumberland New South Wales

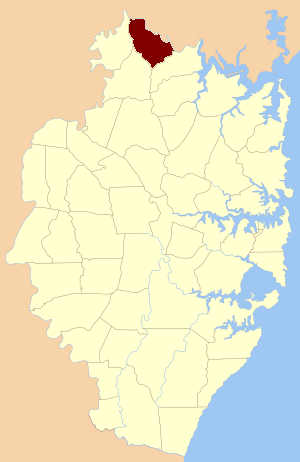
Frederick Parish, Cumberland county.

The Frederic Parish is a civil parish of the County of Cumberland.

The Parish is in the Hornsby Shire Council, on the Hawkesbury River.
