= Parish of Cowan =

Cadastral division in New South Wales, Australia

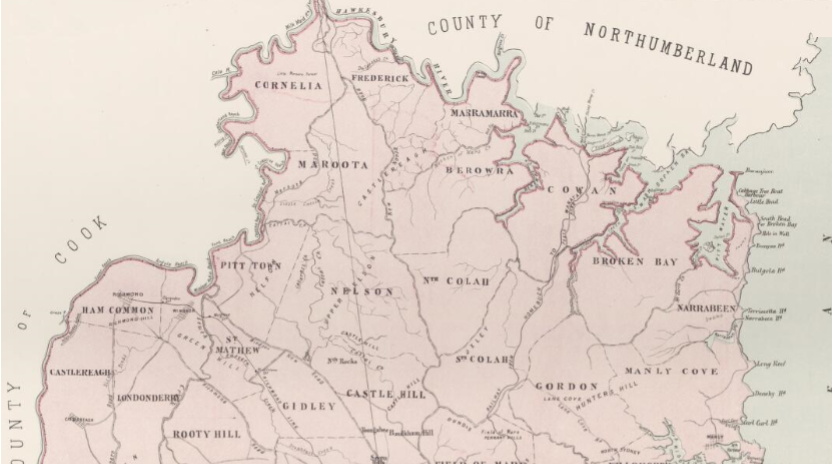
Map showing the Parish of Cowan, 1886.

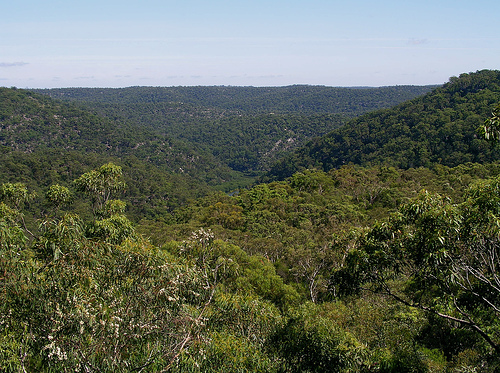
Berowra Park

The Parish of Cowan is a civil parish of Cumberland County, New South Wales.

The parish is in the Hundred of Dundas and Hornsby Shire Council. The parish is also on the Hawkesbury River.

Cowan is believed to be an Aboriginal word meaning 'opposite', 'other side' or 'big water' in the language of the Guringgai tribe, a Sydney Aboriginal clan of the area.

Today much of the parish is national park, though the towns of Cowan and Brooklyn are in the parish.

The Sydney to Newcastle Freeway and Central Coast and Sydney to Newcastle Railway Lines pass through the parish.

== See also ==
- Hundred of Cowan, South Australia
