= Parish of Maroota =

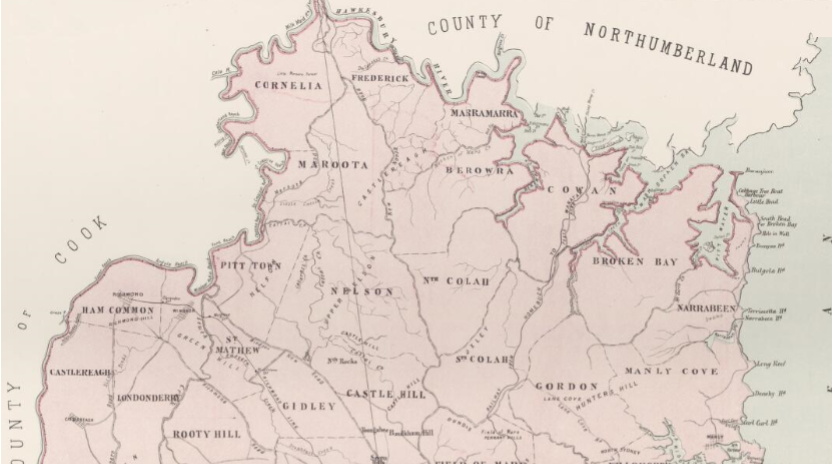
Maroota Parish in the County of Cumberland New South wales.

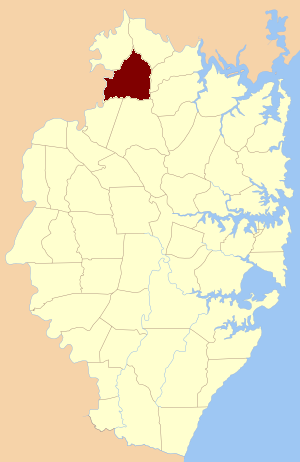
Maroota Parish, Cumberland county.

The Maroota Parish is a civil parish of the County of Cumberland.

The Parish is in the Hundred of Hardigne and The Hills Shire Council, 50km north west of Sydney and on the Nepean River.

== See also ==
- Maroota, New South Wales
