= Parish of Berowra =

Berowra
- Cadastral division
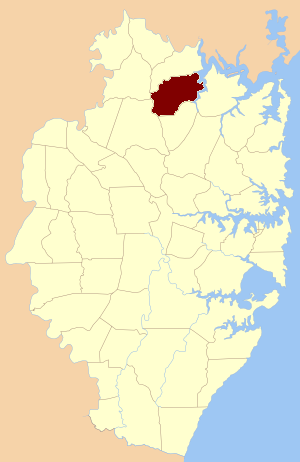
- Location of the parish within Cumberland County
- Country: Australia
- State: New South Wales
- LGA: Hornsby Shire
- County: Cumberland
- Hundred (former): Sydney
- Gazetted: 08-10-1976

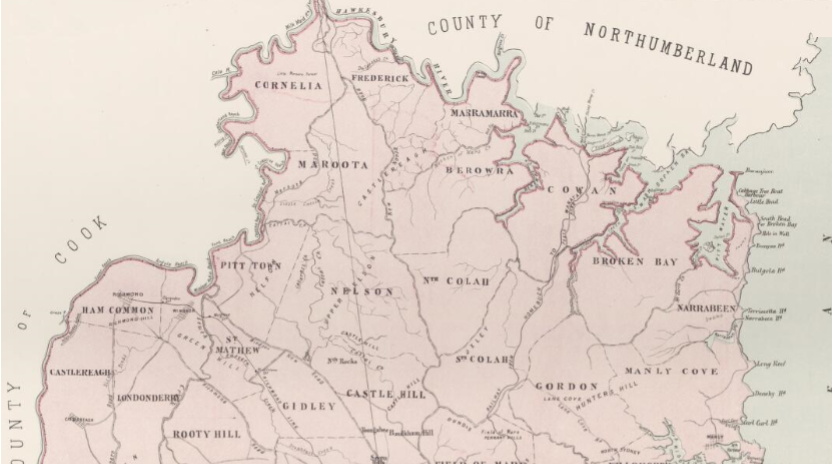
Map showing the Parish of Gidley, 1886.

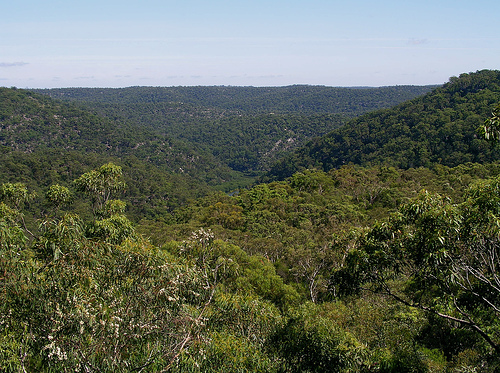
Berowra Park

The Parish of Berowra is a civil parish of the County of Cumberland, New South Wales, Australia.

The parish is in the Hundred of Dundas and Hornsby Shire Council. The parish is on the Hawkesbury River.

Berowra is a word that means place of many shells in the language of the Guringgai tribe, a Sydney Aboriginal clan of the area. The Berowra area has many Aboriginal carvings and is the site of the world's oldest living amphibian fossil. Today much of the parish is a national park.

== See also ==
- Berowra, New South Wales
