= Cumberland County, New South Wales =

Land division county in New South Wales, Australia

Cumberland
- Cadastral division
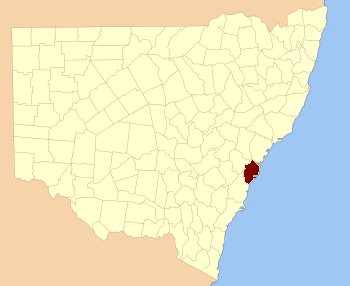
- Location in New South Wales
- Country: Australia
- State: New South Wales
- Established: 4 June 1788
Lands administrative divisions around Cumberland
Hunter	Northumberland	Northumberland
Cook	Cumberland	Pacific Ocean
Camden	Camden	Pacific Ocean

Cumberland County, or the County of Cumberland, is a cadastral division in the state of New South Wales, Australia. The county covers the area of the Cumberland Plain and includes most of the Greater Sydney metropolitan region, stretching from Broken Bay in the north, the Hawkesbury River in the north-west, the Nepean River in the west, the Cataract River in the south-west and to the northern suburbs of Wollongong in the south.

It is worth noting that Cumberland County should not be confused with the former Cumberland County Council, a county council established under the Local Government (Town and Country Planning) Amendment Act 1945 (NSW) to coordinate town planning across Sydney. Despite the shared name, the county council was a separate entity with a distinct (albeit largely overlapping) territory; the Cumberland County District.

== History ==
The name Cumberland was conferred by Governor Arthur Phillip in honour of Prince Henry, Duke of Cumberland and Strathearn at a gathering to celebrate the birthday of his brother, George III, on 4 June 1788.

The County of Cumberland is an administrative area, one of 141 counties established in the Colony of New South Wales for surveying and land title registration, and further divided into 57 parishes in 1835. Land division counties in NSW have little official function and are only used for land titles and geographic surveying.

Between 1945 and 1964 the county was the basis of the city-wide County of Cumberland Planning Scheme, later superseded by a succession of state planning bodies.

The county has been marked on maps since the start of the colony, as shown along the key on a 1789 map which describes Port Jackson as being within the county of Cumberland. In the nineteenth century, parts of the county were in the South and North Riding electoral districts from 1856 to 1859, which were replaced by Central Cumberland. There was also the Cumberland Boroughs electoral district.

== Sub-divisions ==
=== Hundreds ===
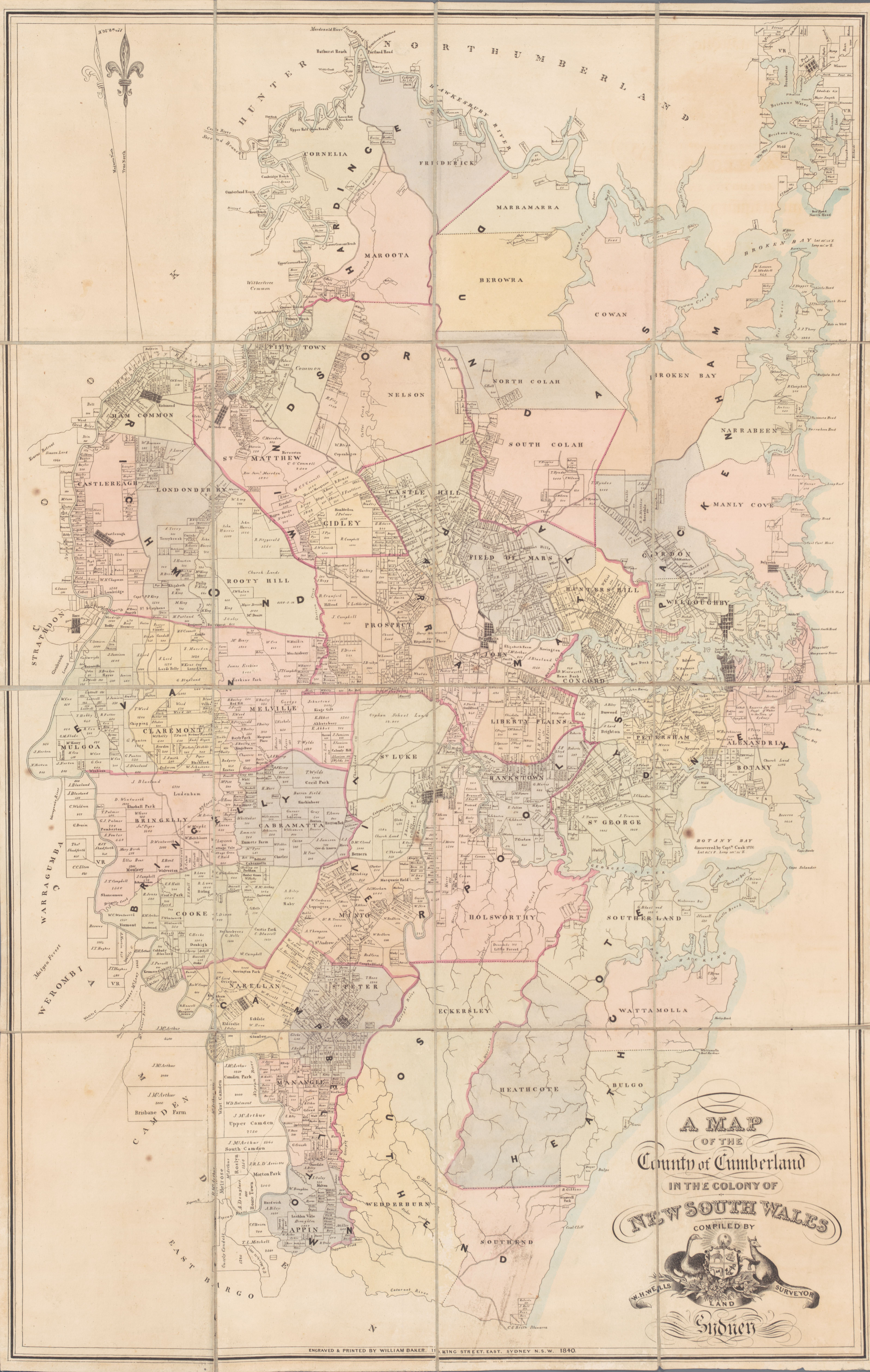
Map of Cumberland County in 1840, showing 13 hundreds and 53 parishes. The four smaller parishes in Sydney city are not displayed.

There were thirteen hundreds in Cumberland County, which were published in a government gazette on 27 May 1835, but repealed on 21 January 1888. Unlike South Australia, the hundreds were never adopted anywhere else in New South Wales. The hundreds:

- Bringelly
- Campbelltown
- Dundas
- Evan
- Hardinge
- Liverpool
- Packenham
- Parramatta
- Richmond
- Southend
- Hundred of Sydney
- Windsor
- Woronora (shown as Heathcote on some maps)

=== Parishes ===
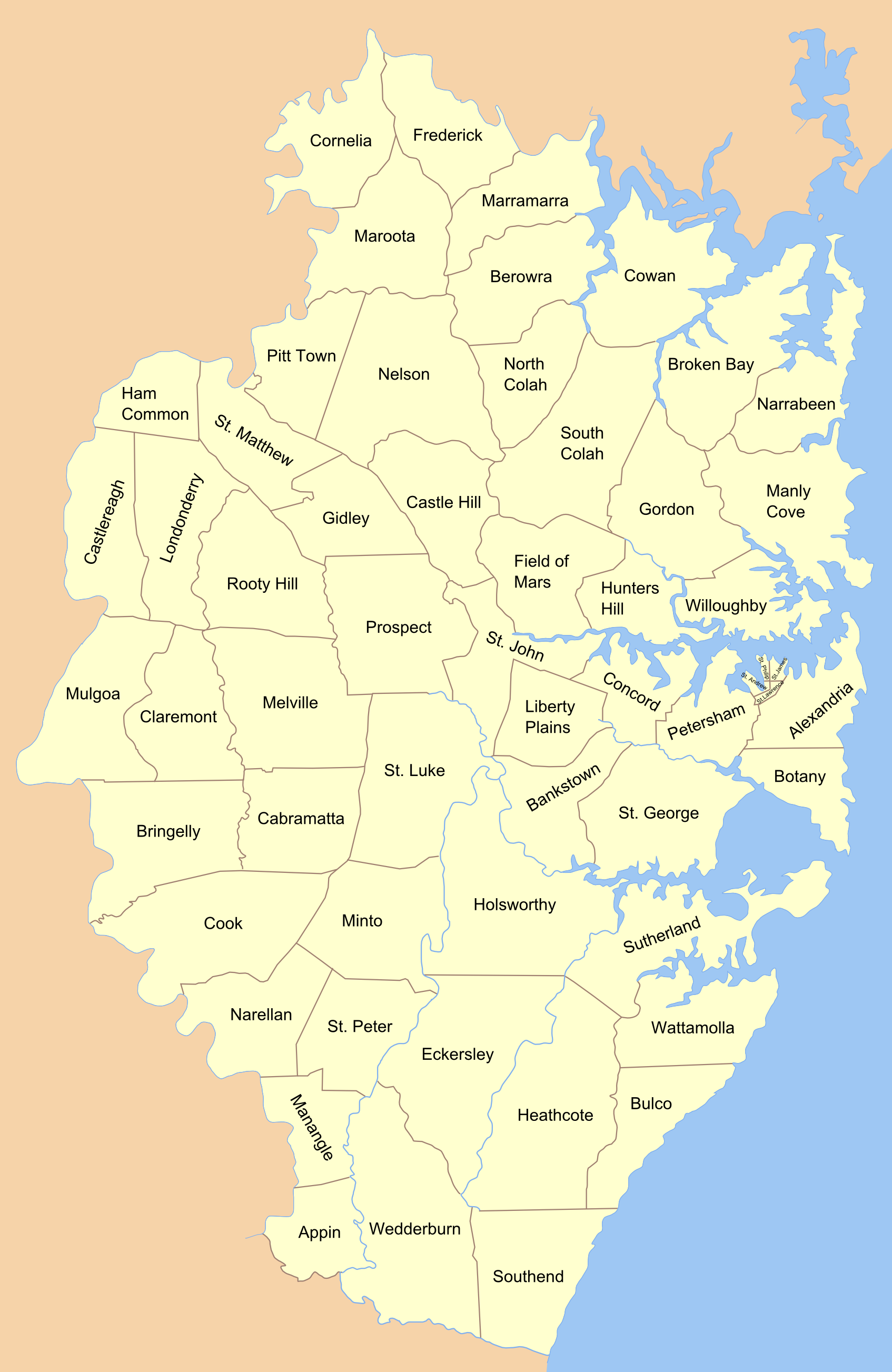
Parishes of Cumberland County

In 1835, Cumberland County was subdivided into 57 parishes. Previously, the subdivisions of the area since the beginning of the colony were called districts. Many of the parishes founded in 1835 kept the name of the district. Others were named after Anglican churches in the same area. This included three of the four small parishes in the Sydney city area: The Parish of St Philip, which is named after St Philip's Church; the Parish of St James, which is named after St James Church, and is still the name of the region today; and finally the Parish of St Andrew which is named after St Andrew's Cathedral. However, the Parish of St Lawrence gave its name to the church, rather than the other way around. Further out of the city, the parishes of St John, St Luke, St Peter and St Matthew, in the Parramatta, Liverpool, Campbelltown and Windsor areas respectively, have Anglican churches which bear the same saints names; St John's in Parramatta (opened 1803); St.Luke's in Liverpool (building began 1818); St.Peter's in Campbelltown (opened 1823, the third oldest Anglican church in Australia); and St. Matthew's in Windsor (consecrated in 1822)

A full list of parishes found within this county; the LGAs which the parish is mostly in (most parish boundaries do not match LGA boundaries exactly), and mapping coordinates to the approximate centre of each location is as follows:

Parish	LGA	Hundred (former)	Coordinates
Alexandria	Municipality of Woollahra	Sydney	33°50′54″S 151°17′04″E
Appin	Wollondilly Shire	Campbelltown	34°11′54″S 150°45′04″E
Bankstown	City of Canterbury-Bankstown	Liverpool	33°55′54″S 150°59′04″E
Berowra	Hornsby Shire	Dundas	33°33′54″S 151°05′04″E
Botany	Bayside Council	Sydney	33°56′54″S 151°14′04″E
Bringelly	City of Penrith	Bringelly	33°53′54″S 150°41′04″E
Broken Bay	Northern Beaches Council	Packenham	33°38′54″S 151°13′04″E
Bulgo	City of Wollongong	Heathcote	34°09′54″S 151°03′04″E
Cabramatta	City of Liverpool	Bringelly	33°54′54″S 150°49′04″E
Castle Hill	The Hills Shire	Parramatta	33°44′54″S 150°41′04″E
Castlereagh	City of Penrith	Richmond	33°40′54″S 150°42′04″E
Claremont	City of Penrith	Evan	33°48′54″S 150°43′04″E
Concord	Canada Bay, Strathfield and Burwood	Sydney	33°51′54″S 151°06′04″E
Cook	Camden Council	Bringelly	33°57′54″S 150°42′04″E
Cornelia	The Hills Shire	Hardinge	32°59′54″S 150°00′04″E
Cowan	Hornsby Shire	Dundas	33°36′54″S 151°08′04″E
Eckersley	City of Campbelltown	Southend	34°04′54″S 150°55′04″E
Field of Mars	City of Parramatta	Parramatta	33°46′54″S 151°03′04″E
Frederick	Hornsby Shire	Hardinge	33°27′54″S 151°02′34″E
Gidley	City of Blacktown	Windsor	33°40′54″S 150°52′04″E
Gordon	Ku-ring-gai Council	Packenham	33°12′54″S 151°09′04″E
Ham Common	City of Hawkesbury	Richmond	33°35′54″S 150°45′04″E
Heathcote	Sutherland Shire	Heathcote	34°05′54″S 150°59′04″E
Holsworthy	City of Liverpool	Liverpool	33°56′54″S 150°57′04″E
Hunters Hill	Ryde, Hunter's Hill	Parramatta	33°47′54″S 151°06′04″E
Liberty Plains	Cumberland, Canterbury-Bankstown	Parramatta	33°51′54″S 151°02′04″E
Londonderry	City of Penrith	Richmond	33°40′54″S 150°45′04″E
Manly Cove	Northern Beaches Council	Packenham	33°46′54″S 151°16′04″E
Maroota	The Hills Shire	Hardinge	33°29′54″S 151°00′04″E
Marramarra	Hornsby Shire	Dundas	33°29′54″S 151°17′04″E
Melville	City of Fairfield	Evan	33°51′16″S 150°49′20″E
Menangle	City of Campbelltown	Campbelltown	34°06′54″S 150°47′04″E
Minto	City of Campbelltown	Liverpool	33°57′54″S 150°51′04″E
Mulgoa	City of Penrith	Evan	33°48′54″S 150°40′04″E
Narellan	Camden Council	Campbelltown	34°02′54″S 150°44′04″E
Narrabeen	Northern Beaches Council	Packenham	33°36′54″S 151°20′04″E
Nelson	The Hills Shire	Windsor	33°36′54″S 150°57′04″E
North Colah	Hornsby Shire	Dundas	33°37′54″S 151°03′04″E
Petersham	Inner West Council	Sydney	33°51′54″S 151°10′04″E
Pitt Town	City of Hawkesbury	Windsor	33°35′54″S 150°53′04″E
Prospect	City of Blacktown	Parramatta	33°46′54″S 150°55′04″E
Rooty Hill	City of Penrith	Richmond	33°43′54″S 150°48′04″E
South Colah	Hornsby Shire	Dundas	33°41′54″S 151°05′04″E
Southend	City of Wollongong	Southend	34°16′54″S 150°55′04″E
St Andrew	City of Sydney	Sydney	33°52′26″S 151°12′23″E
St George	Georges River, Bayside	Sydney	33°56′54″S 151°06′04″E
St James	City of Sydney	Sydney	33°52′10″S 151°12′39″E
St John	Parramatta, Cumberland	Parramatta	33°49′54″S 151°03′04″E
St Lawrence	City of Sydney	Sydney	33°52′53″S 151°12′18″E
St Luke	City of Fairfield	Liverpool	33°51′54″S 150°54′04″E
St Matthew	City of Hawkesbury	Windsor	33°37′54″S 150°49′04″E
St Peter	City of Campbelltown	Campbelltown	34°03′54″S 150°50′04″E
St Philip	City of Sydney	Sydney	33°51′51″S 151°12′22″E
Sutherland	Sutherland Shire	Heathcote	34°01′54″S 151°05′04″E
Wattamolla	Sutherland Shire	Heathcote	34°05′49″S 151°06′27″E
Wedderburn	Wollondilly Shire	Southend	34°14′54″S 150°50′04″E
Willoughby	Lane Cove, Mosman, North Sydney, Willoughby	Packenham	33°49′54″S 151°15′04″E

=== Districts ===
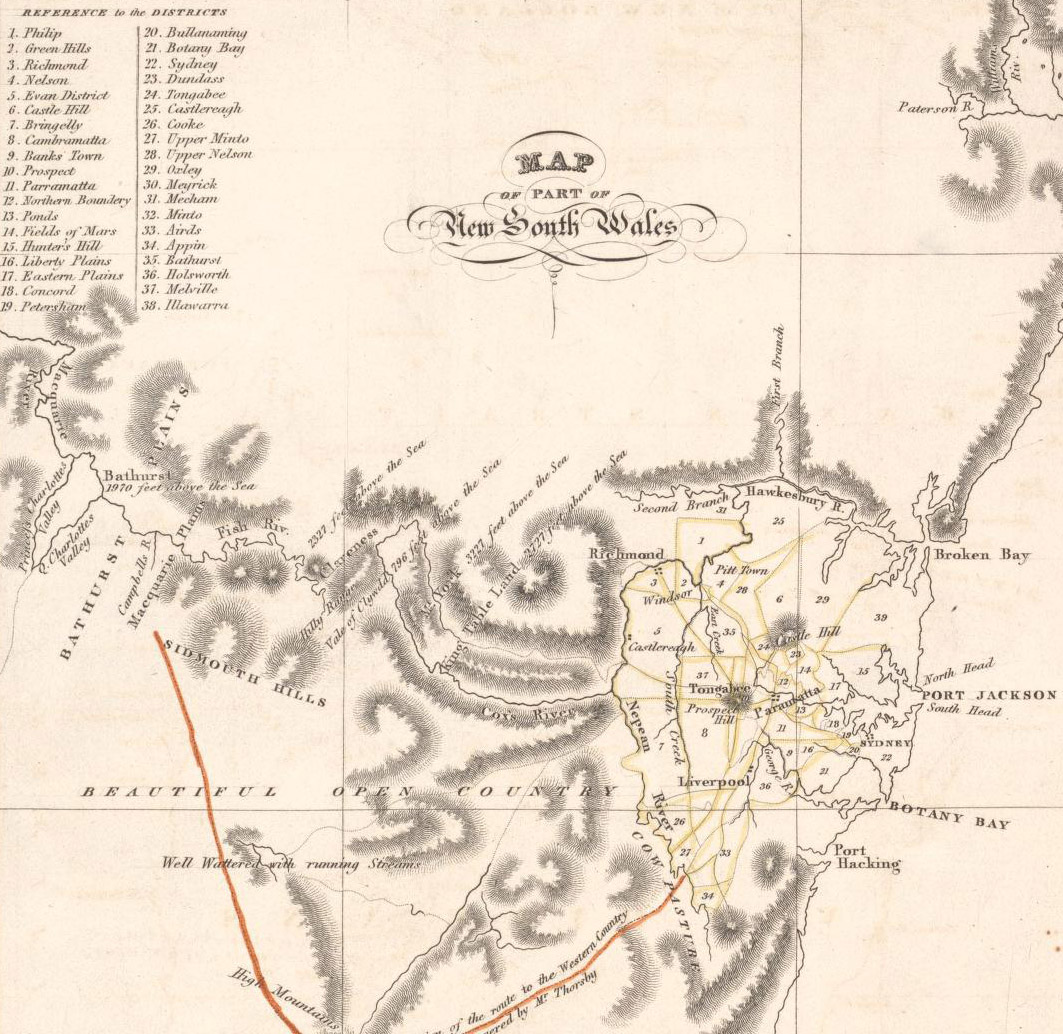
Districts on an 1824 map

The first subdivisions of the county were called districts, shown in early maps from the period, such as 21 districts on an 1810 map and 37 districts on an 1824 map (not including Philip which was across the Nepean River and not part of the county). The districts in use in 1824:

- Airds
- Appin
- Bankstown
- Bathurst
- Botany Bay
- Bringelly
- Bullanaming
- Cambramatta
- Castle Hill
- Castlereagh
- Concord
- Cooke
- Dundas
- Eastern Plains
- Evan
- Field of Mars
- Green Hills
- Holsworthy
- Hunter's Hill
- Illawarra
- Liberty Plains
- Mecham
- Melville
- Meyrick
- Minto
- Nelson
- Northern Boundary
- Oxley
- Parramatta
- Petersham
- Ponds
- Prospect
- Richmond
- Sydney
- Tongabee
- Upper Minto
- Upper Nelson
