= Parish of Manly Cove =

Parish of Cumberland County, New South Wales, Australia

Coordinates: 33°46′54″S 151°16′4″E

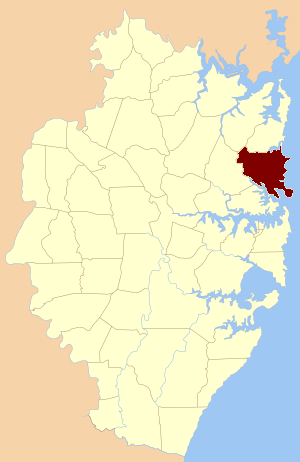
Manly cove Parish

The Parish of Manly Cove is a civil parish of the County of Cumberland on the northern beaches of Sydney and covers numerous suburbs including Fairlight, Frenchs Forrest, Forestville, Kilarney Heights, Dee why, Davidson, Manly and Bookvale.

The boundaries of the parish are the Pacific Ocean to the east, Middle Harbour Creek to the west, Sydney Harbour to the south and Narrabeen Lagoon on the north. Much of the parish is residential in a nature with large tracts of National Park.
