= Municipality of Lidcombe =

Former local government area in New South Wales, Australia

Municipality of Lidcombe New South Wales
- Lidcombe (formerly Rookwood) Town Hall, on Church Street, was the seat of the council from 1897 to 1948.
- Population: 20,281 (1947 census)
  - Density: 909.5/km^{2} (2,355/sq mi)
- Established: 8 December 1891 (Rookwood); 15 October 1913 (Lidcombe)
- Abolished: 31 December 1948
- Area: 22.3 km^{2} (8.6 sq mi)
- Council seat: Lidcombe Town Hall
- Region: Western Sydney
- Parish: Liberty Plains; St John; Concord
LGAs around Municipality of Lidcombe:
Auburn	Parramatta River	Concord
Auburn	Municipality of Lidcombe	Homebush; Strathfield
Auburn	Bankstown	Enfield

The Municipality of Lidcombe was a local government area in the Western region of Sydney, New South Wales, Australia. The municipality was proclaimed as the Borough of Rookwood on 8 December 1891 and was renamed to the Municipality of Lidcombe, a portmanteau of two mayor's names, in order to differentiate itself from the expanding necropolis, from 15 October 1913. It included the modern suburbs of Rookwood, Lidcombe, Homebush Bay (now Sydney Olympic Park and Wentworth Point), Berala and parts of Newington, Silverwater, Homebush West and Regents Park. From 1 January 1949, the council was amalgamated into the Municipality of Auburn, with the passing of the Local Government (Areas) Act 1948.

== Council history ==
=== Early years and development ===
The area was first incorporated on 8 December 1891, when the Governor of New South Wales, The Earl of Jersey, proclaimed the "Borough of Rookwood". The first council was elected on 16 February 1892, with nine aldermen elected at-large.

The Council first met on 24 February 1892, at Gormley's Hall, with Richard Slee having already been elected the first mayor, and William de Burgh Hocter, former Town Clerk of The Glebe, appointed first Town Clerk in March 1892. On 28 November 1896, the foundation stone for the new Town Hall, on Church Street, was laid by the Mayoress, Mrs Lidbury. Designed by J. B. Alderson and built by William Peter Noller of Parramatta, the Town Hall was completed in 1897. From 28 December 1906, following the passing of the Local Government Act, 1906, the council was renamed as the "Municipality of Rookwood".

=== Name change ===
With the continuing growth of the necropolis in the council area, opinion within the council and ratepayers that the "Rookwood" name was now too closely associated with the cemetery was growing. Several names were suggested, but council did not settle on a choice until in July 1913 when Henry R. Hoebey wrote to council suggesting the name "Lidcombe", a portmanteau of two mayor's names, Frederick Lidbury and Henry Larcombe, noting:

"The decision to accept such a name would be an act of grace on the part of the authorities, and would perpetuate the memory of those gentlemen who have rendered great services to the ratepayers of the municipality and on the ground of euphony it is much to be admired."

This name change was accepted by the NSW Department of Public Works and gazetted on 22 October 1913. With the name change, the council also wrote to the state government advising them that the usage of "Necropolis" to refer to the cemetery was now undesirable, favouring "Rookwood" for the cemetery now only. With the passing of the "Rookwood" name the Evening News observed:

"The aldermen are pleased that they have succeeded in sinking into oblivion what has been termed the "unsavory title of Rookwood", and it is freely held that the move will at once make the locality a more popular one."

=== Later history ===
By the end of the Second World War, the NSW Government had realised that its ideas of infrastructure expansion could not be effected by the present system of the patchwork of small municipal councils across Sydney and the Minister for Local Government, Joseph Cahill, following the recommendations of the 1945–46 Clancy Royal Commission on Local Government Boundaries, passed a bill in 1948 that abolished a significant number of those councils. Under the Local Government (Areas) Act 1948, Lidcombe Municipal Council merged with the Municipality of Auburn, which covered the border to the west.

== Mayors ==
Years	Mayor	Notes
18 February 1892 – 17 February 1893	Richard Slee	
17 February 1893 – 14 February 1894	Alban Gee	
14 February 1894 – 21 November 1894	Albert Jones	
27 November 1894 – 13 February 1895	John Thomas Jay	
13 February 1895 – 11 May 1896	Richard Slee	
11 May 1896 – 9 February 1898	Frederick Lidbury	
9 February 1898 – 14 February 1901	John Thomas Jay	
14 February 1901 – 11 February 1904	Richard Thomas	
11 February 1904 – 14 February 1912	Henry John Larcombe	
14 February 1912 – 12 February 1914	Frederick Lidbury	
12 February 1914 – 2 February 1916	Edwin Lane Kingsley	
2 February 1916 – 6 February 1918	William Brown	
6 February 1918 – 6 February 1919	William John Maunder	
6 February 1919 – 10 February 1920	Fred James	
10 February 1920 – 22 December 1920	William John Maunder	
22 December 1920 – 21 December 1921	William Brown	
21 December 1921 – 6 December 1922	Frederick Wilson	
6 December 1922 – 11 December 1929	Edward Norman Wyatt	
11 December 1929 – 6 January 1932	Frederick Wilson	
6 January 1932 – 2 December 1942	Charles William Phillips, Jnr.	
2 December 1942 – 6 December 1944	Frederick Wilson	
6 December 1944 – 10 December 1947	Charles William Phillips, Jnr.	
10 December 1947 – 31 December 1948	Michael Thomas Guilfoyle	

== Town Clerks ==
Years	Town Clerk	Notes
18 February 1892 – 12 March 1892	Richard Peek (interim)	
12 March 1892 – 30 January 1895	William de Burgh Hocter	
29 May 1895 – February 1907	Albert Henry Thew	
March 1907 – 29 July 1911	William John Lake	
16 August 1911 – 28 January 1913	Percy S. J. Crowe	
28 January 1913 – 23 January 1918	Sydney J. Stone	
4 March 1918 – 22 February 1944	Sidney Charles Wayland	
May 1944 – 31 December 1948	Wilfred R. Ames	
