= Parish of Liberty Plains =

Coordinates: 33°51′54″S 151°02′04″E

Liberty Plains
- Cadastral division
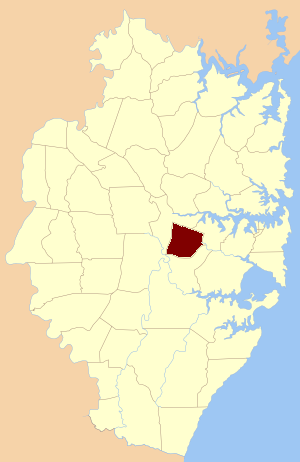
- Location of the parish within Cumberland
- Country: Australia
- State: New South Wales
- LGAs: Cumberland; Canterbury-Bankstown; Strathfield
- Established: 1835
- County: Cumberland
- Hundred (former): Parramatta
Lands administrative divisions around Liberty Plains
St John	St John	Concord
St John	Liberty Plains	Concord
St Luke	Bankstown	Bankstown

Liberty Plains Parish is one of the 57 parishes of Cumberland County, New South Wales, a cadastral unit for use on land titles. It is bounded by Parramatta Road in the north; the boundary between Flemington and Homebush, a small part of Cooks River and Liverpool Road (Hume Highway) in the east; the Hume Highway also in the south; and Woodville Road in the west. It includes the suburbs of Auburn, Regents Park, Potts Hill, Sefton, Chester Hill, Bass Hill and Lidcombe, as well as Flemington and a small part of Strathfield that was formerly part of Flemington. It also includes the Rookwood Cemetery. Before the parish was proclaimed in 1835, the Liberty Plains district was in the same area. The name had been given when the first settlers had desired a settlement midway between Parramatta and Sydney city. The name is still used on a motor inn in the area. In the 1851 census there were 49 houses and 270 people in the Liberty Plains parish.
