= Parish of Minto =

Coordinates: 33°57′54″S 150°51′04″E

Minto
- Cadastral division
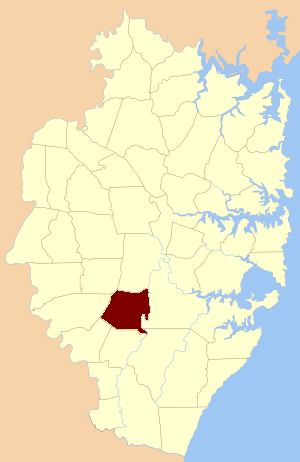
- Location of the parish within Cumberland
- Country: Australia
- State: New South Wales
- LGA: City of Campbelltown
- Established: 1835
- County: Cumberland
- Hundred (former): Liverpool
Lands administrative divisions around Minto
Cabramatta	St Luke	Holsworthy
Cook	Minto	Holsworthy
Narellan	St Peter	Eckersley

Minto Parish is one of the 57 parishes of Cumberland County, New South Wales, a cadastral unit for use on land titles. It includes Minto, Ingleburn, Glenfield and Macquarie Fields. Its eastern boundary is the Georges River, and western boundary was at the Great Southern Road.

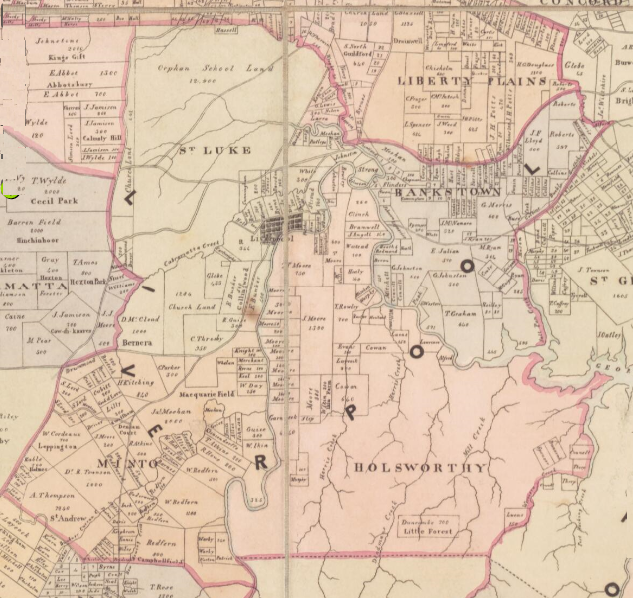
Map from the 1840s of the Hundred of Liverpool in western Sydney, Australia.
