= Parish of St Luke =

Coordinates: 33°53′S 150°54′E

St Luke
- Cadastral division
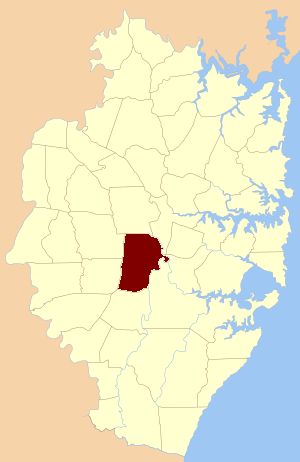
- Location of the parish within Cumberland
- Country: Australia
- State: New South Wales
- LGA: City of Liverpool
- Established: 1835
- County: Cumberland
- Hundred (former): Liverpool
Lands administrative divisions around St Luke
| Melville | Prospect | St John |
| Cabramatta | St Luke | Bankstown |
| Cook | Minto | Holsworthy |

St Luke Parish is one of the 57 parishes of Cumberland County, New South Wales, a cadastral unit for use on land titles. It is bounded by Prospect Creek in the north-east, Georges River in the south-east, and Cowpasture Road in the west. It was named after the Anglican church of St Lukes in Liverpool, which was completed in 1819. The parish is mentioned in various legislation dealing with property law for the city of Liverpool.

The parish includes the Sydney suburbs of Wetherill Park, Smithfield, Bossley Park, Prairiewood, Fairfield West, Wakeley, Canley Heights, Canley Vale, Lansvale, Warwick Farm (including the racecourse), Ashcroft, Busby, Sadleir, Heckenberg, Hinchinbrook, Green Valley, Miller, Cartwright, Lurnea, Prestons and part of Casula.

The Main Southern railway line passes through the parish near its eastern edge, including the stations of Casula, Liverpool, Warwick Farm, Cabramatta, Canley Vale and Fairfield.
