= Parish of Field of Mars =

Coordinates: 33°46′54″S 151°03′04″E

Field of Mars
- Cadastral division
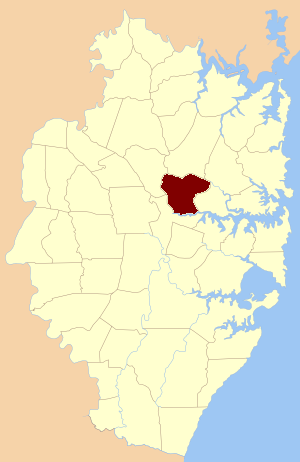
- Location of the parish within Cumberland
- Country: Australia
- State: New South Wales
- LGA: City of Parramatta
- Established: 1835
- County: Cumberland
- Hundred (former): Parramatta
Lands administrative divisions around Field of Mars
Castle Hill	South Colah	Gordon
Castle Hill	Field of Mars	Hunters Hill
St John	St John	Hunters Hill

Field of Mars Parish is one of the 57 parishes of Cumberland County, New South Wales, a cadastral unit for use on land titles. While the name is mostly forgotten as a region name today, it has given the name to the modern suburb of Marsfield and the reserve in the area. It is centred on Carlingford and also includes Epping, Telopea and Ermington. Its southern boundary is the Parramatta River.
