= Parish of Hunters Hill =

Coordinates: 33°47′54″S 151°06′04″E

Hunters Hill
- Cadastral division
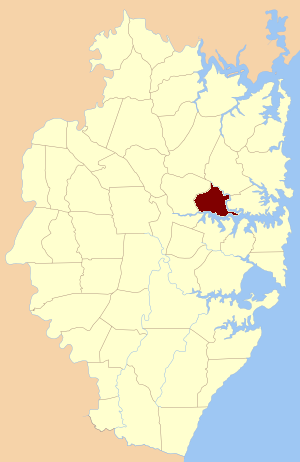
- Location of the parish within Cumberland
- Country: Australia
- State: New South Wales
- LGA: City of Ryde
- Established: 1835
- County: Cumberland
- Hundred (former): Parramatta
Lands administrative divisions around Hunters Hill
South Colah	Gordon	Gordon
Field of Mars	Hunters Hill	Willoughby
St John	Concord	Petersham

Hunters Hill Parish is one of the 57 parishes of Cumberland County, New South Wales, a cadastral unit for use on land titles. It includes the eponymous suburb of Hunters Hill and the Municipality of Hunter's Hill in the east, while the western part of the parish largely corresponds with the City of Ryde.
