= Parish of St John =

Coordinates: 33°49′54″S 151°03′04″E

St John
- Cadastral division
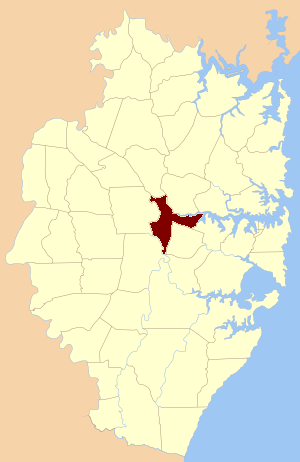
- Location of the parish within Cumberland
- Country: Australia
- State: New South Wales
- LGAs: City of Parramatta; Cumberland Council
- Established: 1835
- County: Cumberland
- Hundred (former): Parramatta
Lands administrative divisions around St John
| Castle Hill | Field of Mars | Hunters Hill |
| Prospect | St John | Concord |
| St Luke | St Luke | Liberty Plains |

St John Parish is one of the 57 parishes of Cumberland County, New South Wales, a cadastral unit for use on land titles. It is named after St John's Cathedral in Parramatta, New South Wales which opened in 1803, on which the civil parish is roughly centred. The parish is shaped like a "T", with the northern part stretching from Toongabbie to the western shore of Homebush Bay. The southern end is at Prospect Creek near Yennora. Woodville Road and Parramatta Road form the boundaries to the south-east. The Old Prospect Road is part of the boundary in the west.

Historically and until the reorganisation of local government areas in 2016, St John Parish largely corresponded with the boundaries of the City of Parramatta. Since the 2016 reorganisation, the northern part of the parish (the horizontal stroke of the "T") is largely in the City of Parramatta, while the southern part is largely in Cumberland City Council. It includes the suburbs of Merrylands, Parramatta, Silverwater, Westmead, Fairfield East, Guildford and Wentworth Point.
