= Holy Innocents Church =

Holy Innocents Church or Church of the Holy Innocents may refer to:

== Australia ==
- Church of the Holy Innocents, Rossmore, Sydney, New South Wales

== New Zealand ==
- Church of the Holy Innocents, Mount Peel

== United Kingdom ==
- Holy Innocents Church, Lamarsh, Essex, England
- Holy Innocents Church, South Norwood, London, England
- Holy Innocents Church, Southwater, Sussex, England

== United States ==
- Holy Innocents Church (Chicago, Illinois)
- Holy Innocents Catholic Church (Roseville, Michigan)
- Holy Innocents' Episcopal Church (Como, Mississippi)
- Church of the Holy Innocents (Hoboken, New Jersey)
- Church of the Holy Innocents (Albany, New York)
- Church of the Holy Innocents (Brooklyn, New York)
- Church of the Holy Innocents (Manhattan, New York)
- Church of the Holy Innocents (Highland Falls, New York)
