= Rossmore, New South Wales =

Rossmore
- Suburb
- Interactive map of Rossmore
- Coordinates: 33°55′21″S 150°46′11″E
- Country: Australia
- State: New South Wales
- City: Sydney
- LGAs: Liverpool; Camden
- Location: 47 km (29 mi) from Sydney
- Established: 1836

Government
  - State electorate: Leppington
  - Federal divisions: Hume; Werriwa

Area
  - Total: 16.3 km^{2} (6.3 sq mi)
- Elevation: 83 m (272 ft)

Population
  - Total: 2,241 (SAL 2021)
- Postcode: 2557
Suburbs around Rossmore
Bradfield	Kemps Creek	Austral
Bringelly	Rossmore	Austral
Catherine Field	Leppington	Leppington

Rossmore is a suburb of Sydney, in the state of New South Wales, Australia.

It is bound to the east by Kemps Creek, the west by South Creek, the north by Fifteenth Avenue, and the south by Rileys Creek in the southwest and a non natural border from there. The main road through the centre of the suburb is Bringelly Road.

== History ==
Rossmore was originally known as Cabramatta after the parish of Cabramatta. It was the subject of a novel called The Cabramatta Store by Mary Theresa Vidal, which is believed to be the first novel published by a woman in Australia. In 1856, the railway line was extended from Granville to Liverpool and a station was established at what is now the modern-day Cabramatta. There was a horse stud in the area called Rossmoor Stud which is believed to have been named after Rossmore Lodge, a famous horse stud in Kildare, Ireland. To avoid confusion with the new station of Cabramatta, the old town of Cabramatta became known as Rossmore.

Rossmore Post Office opened on 22 March 1897.

== Heritage listings ==
Rossmore has a number of heritage-listed sites, including:

- 130 Rossmore Avenue West: Church of the Holy Innocents

== Demographics ==
According to the 2021 census, Rossmore had a population of 2,241 people with a median age of 40, which was slightly higher than the national median age of 38. The majority of people were born in Australia (65.7%), with the other most common countries of birth being Lebanon (5.4%), Italy (3.6%), China (excluding SARs and Taiwan) (3.1%), Malta (2.2%) and New Zealand (1.2%). About half (53.8%) of all respondents only spoke English at home, with Arabic (14.0%), Italian (5.0%), Cantonese (4.4%), Maltese (2.5%) and Spanish (1.3%) forming the top responses for languages spoken at home.

== Housing ==
As of the 2021 census, Rossmore had a total of 707 private dwellings, of which 97.5% were detached houses. Of these occupied private dwellings, 46.0% were owned outright, 31.7% were rented and 16.6% were owned with a mortgage.

== Religious facilities ==
The Church of the Holy Innocents is an Anglican church situated in Church Street, just off Bringelly Road. Its foundation stone was laid on 28 December 1848 or Holy Innocents Day. It is a parish church in the Gothic Revival style and was designed by Richard Cromwell Carpenter and Edmund Blacket. It features steep roofs covered with shingles, an open timber porch, a nave, chancel, belfry and vestry. The church is listed on the New South Wales State Heritage Register and on the (now defunct) Register of the National Estate.

The suburb is also home to three Buddhist temples: the Vinh Duc Meditation Hall, a Vietnamese Buddhist temple, on Allenby Road, the Lin Ying temple on Clementson Drive and the Vat Ketanak Khmer Kampuchea Krom on Wynyard Avenue.

== Transport ==
Bringelly Road connects Rossmore to Liverpool and the Westlink M7, a tollway providing relatively quick connection to Sydney CBD and other parts of greater Sydney. The only public transport in the area is the Route 855/856 bus service connecting Bringelly to Liverpool via Rossmore, Austral, Hoxton Park and Cartwright.

In 2015, a stabling facility opened in Rossmore as part of the South West Rail Link, though the terminus station is located at Leppington.
