= Parish of Cabramatta =

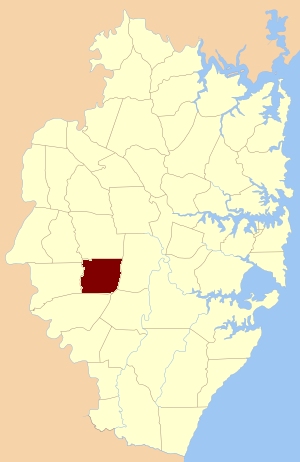
Cabramatta Parish, Cumberland county

The Parish of Cabramatta is a civil parish of Cumberland County, a Cadastral division of New South Wales.

It included the suburbs of Cabramatta, New South Wales, Cecil Hills, Hoxton Park, Rossmore and Liverpool. The southern boundary was Bringelly Road, the eastern boundary was Cabramatta Creek, the western Boundary was South Creek and the northern boundary was Orphan School Road in Fairfield.
