= Church of the Holy Innocents, Rossmore =

Church of the Holy Innocents
- Location within Sydney
- 33°56′36″S 150°45′51″E
- Location: 130 Rossmore Avenue West, Rossmore, New South Wales
- Country: Australia
- Denomination: Anglican

History
- Status: Church

Architecture
- Functional status: Active
- Architects: Richard Cromwell Carpenter; Edmund Blacket
- Years built: 1848–1850

Administration
- Diocese: Sydney

New South Wales Heritage Register
- Official name: Church of the Holy Innocents, Rossmore
- Type: State heritage (complex / group)
- Designated: 24 August 2018
- Reference no.: 2005
- Type: Church
- Category: Religion
- Builders: William Munro

The Church of the Holy Innocents is a heritage-listed Anglican church at 130 Rossmore Avenue West, Rossmore, New South Wales, Australia. It was designed by Richard Cromwell Carpenter and Edmund Blacket and built from 1848 to 1850 by William Munro. The property is owned by Anglican Church Property Trust Diocese of Sydney, though it was added to the New South Wales State Heritage Register on 24 August 2018.

== History ==
=== Traditional owners ===
The original inhabitants of the Liverpool area were the Gandangara people. The pre-European landscape of the area consisted of open eucalyptus woodland. Across this country the Gandangara people utilised many of the flora and fauna resources during everyday life. Many aspects of the local landscape would have held spiritual importance for the Gandangara people. It is unknown if the land upon which the Cabramatta village or the church lands associated with the Church of the Holy Innocents was used for any specific economic, settlement, or spiritual/sacred purposes by the Gandangara.

=== British settlement ===
From the early 1800s European settlers began to encroach on Gandangara lands and settle on what they named the Liverpool plains. Directly organised British colonisation of the area commenced in the 1810s during the governorship of Macquarie (1810–1821) through the alienation of land and the imposition of the rule of British law. Land alienation proceeded through the issuing of large land grants to prominent settlers who had the means to establish extensive stock runs. This resulted in the area being sparsely settled with family estates dotted throughout the landscape. These stock runs were often quite isolated with the main meeting and social places being the few local churches or other public amenities such as stores, pubs, and post offices situated along the main thoroughfares of the region.

Colonisation of the area continued during the 1820s and 1830s under Governors Brisbane (1821–1825) and Darling (1825–1831). However, by the mid-1820s there was a change in the surveying system of the colony undertaken under the orders of Lord Bathurst, which took a more progressive outlook to the future of the colony. This was in response to difficulties in the land surveying department in the early and mid-1820s where the surveying of the numerous grants allocated by Governors Macquarie and Brisbane had not yet been carried out. Lord Bathurst's plan required that the colony be systematically surveyed and split up into counties, hundreds, and parishes and that township, village, public road, school, burial ground, and church reserves be situated in appropriate locations for future need as the local population increased and more free settlers immigrated to the colony. This systematic survey of the entire colony, the Nineteen Counties or the Limits of Location, was eventually carried out by Major Thomas Livingstone Mitchell, Surveyor General from 1828. Overall, the imposition of this settlement model on the Australian landscape was one of the early attempts by the British authorities to recreate a British agricultural landscape, dotted with small farms and villages, in the colony.

Lord Bathurst's also ordered that one-seventh of the land of each county, according to extent and value, was to be put aside as the Clergy and School Estate. The purpose of this estate was to fund and support the Established Church of England and its clergy in the colony, as well as the education of the colony's youth in Anglican principals. To manage these grants, Lord Bathurst detailed that a Clergy and School Lands Corporation should be established to manage their sale, which would then provide funds for the religious and educational development of the colony.

During the surveying of the colony a township reserve was situated in the Parish of Cabramatta, within the County of Cumberland, located to the southwest of Liverpool on the east bank of South Creek. This township was also named Cabramatta and formed the only township reserve allocated to this parish, as the remainder had been granted away during the 1810s and early 1820s. This township reserve was close to the estates of Horningsea Park (Joshua John Moore) and Cow-de-knaves (John Jamieson) and in 1830 the Bellfield Farm estate was established to its north. A school and church reserve was allocated to the Cabramatta village reserve when it was created around 1827. This reserve was one acre in size and came, over time, to comprise an eastern half for a school and church and a western half for a burial ground.

Due to the excesses of Governor Macquarie with regard to the construction of public buildings in Sydney and other areas of the colony during his period in office, Colonial officials in London dictated that public needs be met more modestly by Governor Brisbane during his tenure. As a result of this and Lord Bathurst's new plan for the surveying of the Colony, Brisbane established the Clergy and School Lands Corporation in 1826 to manage the provision of education and religious needs to the colony. This corporation was run by a committee of Anglicans which included Archdeacon Thomas Hobbs Scott, the Reverend Samuel, and three prominent Anglican laymen. One of its goals was to provide simple schools and rectories for the local populations in rural areas. It was to have been financed by the sale of the Clergy and School Estate lands, as well as other investments, but funds were slow to be amassed via this method since no land was allocated to the corporation until 1828 (due to issues in the colonial surveying department). As a result, the corporation had only limited funds to operate during its early years. Thus, they operated by building modest, often timber, vernacular buildings in places of need that could serve as both schools and churches. To facilitate this the architects, Joshua Thorp and William Aird, provided the corporation with some designs for simple chapels and school-church buildings. Ultimately, the Clergy and School Lands Corporation was not a success and its activities were suspended in 1829, before its charter was finally revoked in 1833, following complaints from the other denominations about the dominance of the Anglicans.

In 1827 the Clergy and School Lands Corporation built a simple slab timber school/church hall on the southeast corner of the church reserve in Cabramatta township. This small building was typical of those constructed by the corporation in rural areas to serve the educational and religious needs of these small communities. The hall had a capacity of 100 people and from its opening the acting school master was the Reverend A. Lideliard. This new hall was located in the vast parish of the Cow Pastures which was under the stewardship of the Reverend Thomas Hassall (1794–1868) from its conception in 1826. It is likely that Hassall occasionally visited this hall to perform services as he toured his parish, with regular services being conducted by a local curate.

Soon after the construction of the school/church hall in 1828 the building required further additions and repairs. These works were carried out by an Edward Pender and consisted of laying flooring and skirting, providing church furniture (sofas, a table, and seating for children), and lining and jams for the windows and doors. By 1829 the building was being used once every Sunday for services and in 1830 Reverend Hassall was noted as being the rector or officiating minister of Cabramatta which still had a population of a 100. This suggests that in the years following its construction the hall was used by the populations of the surrounding estates regularly for worship and teaching, along with perhaps other community purposes. Education was the purview of the Church of England during this period and it is likely that the local minister, Reverend Hassall, arranged for the appointment of a qualified headmaster or mistress of the school.

After the school/church hall at Cabramatta was erected a cemetery was established at the rear of the school and church reserve. The first recorded burial in this cemetery was a four-month old baby boy, William Fox, on 22 November 1829. This burial and several others during the 1830s and 1840s were registered at surrounding churches (such as St Lukes, Liverpool). It is possible that earlier burials from 1825 or 1827 onwards occurred in the church grounds, but these were unregistered. From 1848, when new lands were granted to the Anglican Church under the Church Act for the construction of the Church of the Holy Innocents, this cemetery was officially granted as a burial ground and a register of burials kept from 1851.

Despite the repairs made in 1828, by 1832 the slab timber school/church hall was beginning to fall into disrepair and Archdeacon William Broughton advised Reverend Hassall that the building needed to be repaired or demolished. Consequently, in December 1832, Hassall commissioned substantial repairs to the hall by Joseph Heron to improve the buildings suitability as a church. The documentation for these repairs reveals that the building had a school room and two small "back" rooms. At this time there was still one chaplain (Hassall) servicing Cabramatta and the surrounding region, which was now described as the Cook district and also included Mulgoa, South Creek, Camden, and Stone Quarry Creek.

The following year (1833) Robert Bell, the owner of the estate to the north adjoining the Cabramatta town reserve, petitioned the government to finally establish a township and offer the town allotments at auction. Bell hoped to add to his estate through this process and provide himself with a road access to his property via Bringelly Road. Following this request the government further investigated the site, but the Surveyor General reported to the Colonial Secretary that the reserve was not on the great road, was "ill-watered" and, therefore, not suitable for the establishment of a town. Consequently, it was not until 1840 that the town allotments were put up at auction and Robert Bell was able to purchase the majority to add to his estate.

==== Plans for a permanent church at Cabramatta ====
In 1836 the local Anglican community were using the hall (log built school house) for services on a fortnightly basis with its capacity being recorded as 60 people. The passing of the Church Act this year encouraged Bishop Broughton to begin plans to construct a permanent and substantial church at Cabramatta for this district. At this time the populations of the surrounding estates were growing and a need was seen for a more permanent and auspicious church. Two hundred pounds was soon subscribed, mainly by the local population, for the cost of this church. The local community felt that this new church should be dedicated to the Holy Innocents. This name indicates the "high church" leanings of the local congregation and their designs for the church. In contrast "low church" churches are normally named after saints. The Feast of the Holy Innocents, after which the church is named, is more of an orthodox catholic tradition.

Governor Burke's (1831–1837) 1836 Church Act granted state recognition and support for the main denominations operating in Australia: the Church of England, Presbyterian Church, and Catholic Church. It provided extra funding through a pound for pound subsidy for new churches costing between 600 and 2000 pounds. However, before a church could be built the local area was required to prove, through a petition, that at least 150 residents of the particular denomination were present and would use and support the church. This Act was designed to forward the construction of churches of these denominations across the colony while also providing funding for the stipends of ministers and, generally, improve the moral condition of the still largely convict population. To further encourage new church construction the Act also made additional land grants available for churches and schools. However, it required new churches to be designed by a professional architect and approved by the colonial architect. Through recognising and assisting other denominations this Act served to diminish the power of the Church of England in Australia, which had previously been the de facto Established Church of the colony. This was especially so after Bourke later extended the Act to include the Methodist, Wesleyan, and Baptist Christian denominations, as well as Judaism. In this manner, the Act helped to foster a religious pluralism in the colony.

Broughton had arrived in Australia in 1829 to fill the post of Archdeacon of NSW. He was a High Churchman and firm supporter of the Church of England and would not countenance deviation from its established rules in the colony. At the time of his arrival there were only eight parish churches in the colony (of which the majority had been constructed by Macquarie) and Broughton soon sought to remedy this situation. When back in England in 1835–1836 he organised for an annual 1000 pound grant from the English Society for the Propagation of the Gospel, as well as other immediate gifts, that allowed him to bring clergy to Australia and begin the work of building churches and rectories throughout the colony. As an amateur architect and enthusiast in ecclesiological architecture Broughton also procured suitable drawings and working plans for churches. While the 1836 Church Act gave considerable impetus to church expansion, great organisation was required to see a church constructed, and Bishop Broughton was a tireless and long travelling organiser who helped see the construction of many churches. He consecrated or dedicated almost a hundred church buildings throughout his long episcopate career demonstrating his organisational skills and dedication to this cause.

In 1836 Broughton was elevated to the Bishopric of the new see of Australia. Just prior to this, in 1835, he had been exposed to the work of the Oxford scholars that came to be known as Tractarians. Although Broughton never considered himself a Tractarian, he was influenced by their work and sympathised with and supported them by giving them appointments where possible. This support of the Tractarians, and by extension the Cambridge Camden Society, led Broughton to establish Gothic architecture as the most suitable for ecclesiological architecture in the colony. Prior to the mid-1830s gothic ornamentation had only been used on the exterior of new churches in an amateur fashion and it was only just beginning to be seen as a suitable style for "modern" ecclesiological architecture. This state of affairs continued into the early 1840s due to a lack of skilled tradesmen and competent and knowledgeable architects, despite the incentives of the Church Act. It was not until the mid-1840s that an influx of Scottish tradesmen and architects such as Edmund Blacket began to alleviate this situation. Prior to this the Anglican Church Act norm had been small symmetrical churches with almost double cube proportions, symmetrical north and south porches placed midway along the length of the church, western bell-cotes, and detailing such as buttresses, hood-moulds, and pinnacles. From the 1840s there was a definitive move toward medievalism in Anglican ecclesiological architecture as the Gothic Revival movement took hold in the colony and by the mid-1840s there was a definite commitment to archaeological fidelity (a commitment to correct medieval detail) in gothic architecture.

==== The construction of the Church of the Holy Innocents ====
Throughout the early 1840s efforts continued towards the construction of a permanent church at Cabramatta, but it appears that funds were slow to be raised due to the collapse of the colonial wool industry. This is likely as many of the local large estates holders were among those who subscribed towards the construction of the church, including the holders of "Vermont (J. J. Riley Esq)", "Berling (Mrs S. Lowe)", "Bellfield (Robert Bell Esq)", "Retreat Farm (Alfred Kennerley Esq)", "Newstead", "Eastwood", "Wilton Park (A. J. Lidingtone)", and "Exeter Farms". In 1845 when the Reverend George Vidal was appointed to the Parish of Denham Court and the Cabramatta area was subsumed into this parish it was reported that services at the school/church hall were held fortnightly and attended by an average of 20 people. However, while services were held as Cabramatta regularly, confirmations and marriages were held at St Mary's Denham Court.

Despite the incentive of the Church Act and the assistance of Bishop Broughton it took the local congregation and the Anglican Church until 1846 before the necessary funds (311 pounds) were gathered to commence the design and construction of the new church at Cabramatta. Bishop Broughton chose a Gothic Revival design produced by one of the Cambridge Camden Society's leading architects, Richard Cromwell Carpenter. Carpenter had designed and built St John the Baptist Church at Cookham Dean in Berkshire, England in 1844–45 and it was a copy of this design that Bishop Broughton had acquired through Reverend William Horatio Walsh, a correspondent of the Society's journal. Reverend Walsh had met Edmund Blacket when he had been appointed to finish Christ Church St Laurence in 1843 and been introduced to Gothic architecture by him. They, subsequently, became close friends as Christ Church was Blacket's parish church and Reverend Walsh, therefore, his Rector and one of his great supporters. The finished design of Christ Church in 1845 was unapologetically High Church and Tractarian and caused a great scandal among the Evangelical Anglicans in the colony . Reverend Walsh became a leader among the colonial Tractarians, which explains his promotion of Carpenter's Gothic Revival inspired church design to Bishop Broughton. The Church of St John the Baptist, Cookham Dean, had been described and lauded in the societies' journal "The Ecclesiologist" when it was completed in 1845, to which Bishop Broughton and other members of the colonial clergy subscribed. In this article it was described as a fourteenth century style church of "a very simple" and "most satisfactory design" but "not mean or starved" and "of unpretending but solemn character". It is highly likely that it was these properties of the design that brought it to Broughton's attention and inspired him to acquire copies of the drawings. Previously a copy of this design had been acquired by Bishop Nixon of Tasmania and it was used to construct a church at Buckland, Tasmania between August 1846 and January 1849.

Edmund Blacket, soon after his arrival in the Colony in 1842, had come to the attention of Broughton. He subsequently made use of Blacket's knowledge of Gothic architecture to further his plans to provide proper ecclesiological buildings within his diocese. Blacket, as Diocese Architect, amended and drew up the construction plans for the new Cabramatta church based on the Carpenter design provided to him by Bishop Broughton. The dictates of Gothic Revival architecture at this time commended and encouraged the authentic replication of medieval designs. In this tradition Blacket kept most of the prominent elements of Carpenter's design, while decreasing the size of the church, changing its construction materials from stone to brick, adding to some aspects of the design, and designing the interior nave and chancel furniture and trimmings. He likely also set out the tracery geometry for the building. Blacket also definitely designed the beautiful fourteen century style stone font as this design is extant within his papers at the Mitchell Library. In this manner, the Church of the Holy Innocents remained an authentic Carpenter design while being adapted to an Australian location and landscape. In December 1849 Blacket became the Colonial Architect and in this capacity had the responsibility of supervising the continued construction of the church.

Prior to the construction of the church, a survey was undertaken of the church lands in March 1848 in association with the granting of additional lands for the new church under the Church Act (this included the original church reserve). Following this grant the church lands now comprised three acres which were described as: two roods for a school house associated with the United Church of England and Ireland; two roods for a dwelling house, garden, and other appurtenances for the clergyman; and one acre for a burial ground. The trustees of these church lands were John Campbell, James John Riley, and Edward Lummas Moore. Two road reserves were also added to the Cabramatta town plan to the east and west of the new church lands at this time.

The foundation stone for the Church of the Holy Innocents was laid on 28 December 1848 (Holy Innocents Day) by Bishop Broughton with an accompanying ceremony. Holy Innocents Days or the Feast of the Holy Innocents is a festival held by the Christian Churches that commemorates or mourns the massacre of male children by King Herod during his attempts to kill the infant Jesus (the Slaughter of the Innocents). These children were considered to be the first martyrs by the early church. For some years prior to this the local congregation had continued having services in the school/church hall and on this day a service was held in the building that was officiated by the Reverend George Vidal.

Bishop Broughton's speech at the ceremony was somewhat political in tone, referring to recent events that had eroded the position of the Church of England as the colony:

'We have here the rudimens [sic] of a mighty empire. But what would be its greatness, or how could any country be great except so far as the national character was formed and directed by Gospel truth. If they looked to England, which at this moment exhibited a spectacle of order and firmness which excited the wonder of the surrounding nations, to what were they to attribute this. It might be said to the excellency of the national institutions. But they ought to go back to a cause which lay deeper than this to that upon which those institutions themselves rested: to the continued adherence of England to the fear of God, and to the principles of the reformed catholic faith which still lived in the affections of the people and ruled their hearts, and influenced their conduct, and similar results must not be expected in this country, unless attachment to the Church were as extensively disfussed [sic] among its inhabitants.'

— Sydney Gazette, 2 January 1849.

It is likely that Broughton was making a statement with the design and construction of this church about the status of the Church of England in colonial society and what its future directions should be (i.e. High Church and Tractarian). Its first reverend, George Vidal, was a recognised "High Churchman" and Tractarian and was sympathetic to the ideals of Bishop Broughton and the Camden Cambridge Society.

Construction of the church began immediately afterwards and was overseen by the builder William Monroe. Monroe was a local Liverpool builder already with some experience in church construction within the local area. He had immigrated to the colony in the early 1840s as part of a scheme to encourage tradesmen to settle in the colony. Munro's detailed accounts of the building works are extant at the NSW State Archives, which shows that he was a skilled and experienced builder and able to produce a first rate result with minimal drawings and supervision. His later building work included a Catholic church at Berrima that brought him to the attention of Bishop Polding who became his patron. Throughout the 1840s and 1850s he steadily gained in experience so that he could act as an architect and by the late 1850s he had been appointed Diocese Architect of the Sydney Catholic Church, a position he served throughout the 1860s. Later in 1873 he also acted as the architect for the Presbyterian College of St Andrew at Sydney University. However, he has been described as a poor architect, despite his experience in building a number of churches designed by prominent architects.

According to the common procedures of the Church Act the construction work was regularly inspected by Edmund Blacket acting as Colonial Architect. His inspections allowed him to certify the accounts for the construction and report to the Colonial Secretary so the government funds for the work, 350 pounds, could be paid out. The church was completed in October 1850, just under two years after the commencement of construction, and it was consecrated by Bishop Broughton on 7 November 1850. The following year a brief report appeared in the Ecclesiologist, authored by Canon Horatio Walsh, describing its small nature but commenting that "its forms and details within and without show[ing] a most satisfactory example of ecclesiological development".

==== Operation of the Church of the Holy Innocents ====
Throughout its life the Church of the Holy Innocents at Cabramatta, and then Rossmore, has been situated in two Parishes: Denham Court and Cobbitty. It was attached to the Parish of Denham Court up until 1877 when it was moved into the boundaries of the Parish of Narellan-Cobbitty. It was then moved back into the boundaries of the Parish of Denham Court in 1901. From 1901 to 1925 this "parish" was known as the Mission District of Denham Court and Rossmore (which included Minto until 1916). In 1926 Denham Court and Rossmore were made a parish.

At the time of the construction of the Church of the Holy Innocents the incumbent for the Parish of Denham Court was the Reverend George Vidal (1815–1878) who became one of the High Churchmen of the colony. He is known to have had some sympathy for the ideals of the Cambridge Camden Society and Tractarianism. Reverend Vidal was ordained by Bishop Broughton as a Deacon in 1840 and as a Priest in 1841 before being appointed to the Parish of Denham Court in 1846. He remained in this parish, serving at St Mary the Virgin Church at Denham Court and the Church of the Holy Innocents at Cabramatta until 1855 when he was transferred to the parish of Mulgoa (near Penrith). In 1867 he was appointed incumbent of Christ Church, St Laurence, Sydney and soon after appointed a canon. He remained in this position until his death in 1878.

After the construction of the Church of the Holy Innocents the original timber slab school/church hall continued to be used as a community hall (and possibly a school) until c.1886 when a new weatherboard and galvanised iron hall was built. This was during the early years of the Parish of Cobbitty's management of the church. This new Church Hall was intended to serve as a place where community gatherings could be held and funds raised for the upkeep of the church and church yard. From 1902 the hall was also used as a school until 1920 when Rossmore Public School was established on the opposite side of Bringelly Road, During WWII the hall was again used as a government school for a brief period from 1939 onwards. Community gatherings continued to be held in the hall until 1982 before the building was demolished in 1987. The current brick rectory to the southeast of the churchyard was constructed in the same year with the Reverend Ross Nicholson serving as the first curate.

The old school/church hall was not demolished when the new church hall was built in the 1880s and it appears to have continued in some form of use up until 1931 when it was destroyed by bushfires according to oral tradition.

===== Appendix 1: The Tractarian Movement and Cambridge Camden Society =====
The early nineteenth century was a time of revolution in doctrine and liturgy for the Church of England as it faced challenges to its dominance and a curtailment of its privileges in Britain as the UK moved more towards secularism and religious pluralism. These changes led many Anglicans to fight back against what they saw as unjust attacks against the proper English Church and attempt to revitalise it to restore its prominence.

The Oxford or Tractarian movement, named after their publication "Tracts for the Times", was formed at Oxford in 1833 as a new school of churchmanship. Initially, it was a focussed on ascertaining the rightful position and nature of the Church of England within contemporary society. It had been formed as a protest against the State and liberal pressure being directed against the Church of England at the time and was part of the Church taking stock of its purpose and mission. However, as it rapidly grew and was influenced by the Romantic Movement it morphed into a widespread affirmation of the spiritual and historical integrity and apostolic character of the Church of England. It insisted that the sacramental character of the Church be given proper reverence. The movement argued for the reinstatement of some older Christian traditions of faith and their inclusion into Anglican liturgy and theology. Overall, Tractarianism focussed on the Catholic heritage of the church and the apostolic succession, espoused that the liturgical emphasis should be on the sacraments, and was strongly opposed to any segregation in church based on social differentiation. At this time the liturgical emphasis of the Church of England was on the spoken word with the pulpit being the focus of attention and there was commonly social segregation through the use of rented pews for the wealthy and open galleries for the poor.

The emphasis of Tractarianism on the sacraments reflected the devotion of the movement to the supernatural. For them the sacraments acted as "an outward sign of an invisible inward happening" where the minister was the magical link between the congregation and God. Symbolism served as the means by which the link between the real and supernatural worlds were expressed. In this manner the following architectural forms symbolised or represented: the nave the Church Militant; the rood the Church Expectant; the chancel the Church Triumphant; three steps the Trinity; the octagonal form Eternity; the eagle for St John; the alb purity; and the stole as the priest's reminder of the yoke of his responsibilities. The Tractarians also incorporated the Gothic (or medieval) spirit into their movement. This involved both the incorporation of this spirit into theology, but also the interrelating of Gothic architecture with "historical Anglican thought and practice".

Tractarianism was, overall, a divisive movement, as among its supporters it generated much excitement, but at the same time it brought about resolute and firm opposition among its, often Evangelical, opponents. The nature of the movement to look towards the medieval past for inspiration led its liberal critics to label it as retrogressive and its Evangelical opponents as pro-Roman Catholic and a threat to the Protestant Church. Indeed, several of the movement's leaders seceded to the Roman Catholic Church.

There was some focus by this movement on colonial spheres where a lack of establishment allowed greater scope for change, particularly in contrast to the restrictive conditions in England. This was especially the case during the earlier phases of the movement when its ambitions were Empire wide in scope. The early nineteenth century was a period of expansion of the British Empire and in each new colony the Church of England was forced to establish itself. The Tractarians perceived this to be an excellent opportunity to create models of their new order to demonstrate to their British audience and acted to provide support for colonial bishops in terms of clergy, funds, and designs, just when they were most needed. In NSW the reduction of the Church of England to denominational status after the 1836 Church Act garnered the movement some sympathy among colonial clergy. It became established in the colonial church in the 1840s under the patronage of Bishop Broughton and invigorated the local church, but at the cost of more than a century of conflict within its circles. Generally, "High Churchmen", such as Bishop Broughton were persuaded by the Tractarian arguments, but the older, usually Evangelical, colonial clergy were opposed to and infuriated by it.

The Cambridge Camden Society, later the Ecclesiological Society, was originally established to study the design and execution of ecclesiastical ornaments and buildings. This organisation was closely allied with the Tractarian movement as their goal was to provide structural expression for the liturgical and doctrinal ideals they developed. They eventually settled on Gothic architecture as being the most fitting for church construction and promoted these designs in Britain and across her colonies. In accordance with their goals they had very stringent architectural standards and design requirements. The society advocated an architectural form known as "symbolic sacramentality" which was a system where the material fabric of the structure was designed to symbolise or embody some abstract meaning and through which an expression of liturgy could be articulated structurally. In essence the society aimed to develop a style that could best embody "both liturgical and architectural beauty without striving for effect".

This society aimed to implement the reformations of the Tractarian Movement through igniting a change in ecclesiological architecture in England. The favoured design or icon of the society ultimately came to be an idealised version of the 14th Century English country parish church and particularly the designs modelled after this type by its favoured architects in the 1830s and 1840s. This design stressed the proper definition and separation of the nave and chancel; the allocation of the chancel with fair proportions; the placement of the font at the entrance to the church; the addition of an exterior porch; the provision of aisles with the subsequent threefold division of the nave symbolising the holy trinity; the provision of an un-galleried nave furnished with open benches; the establishment of the chancel, sanctuary, and altar as the focus of the congregation through their elevation with steps (ideally three each); the sub-division of the chancel into a chorus cantorum and sacrarium; and the alignment of the church so that it faced east. Church design should also encourage the exclusion of the congregation from the chancel. A tower was not considered an essential element, but if provided should be at the west end or at the crossing of the church if it featured transepts. The most ideal gothic style was the Decorated dating to between 1260–1360 (13th–14th Centuries) and building materials stone, or less so flints, with bricks only being used as an alternative when neither was available. In this manner, a church should emphasise auditory and hierarchal values in its architecture. This design was in contrast to the traditional early nineteenth century style that featured high box pews, triple-decker pulpit, and a western gallery containing harmonium and choir.

The society's development during the 1830s–1850s coincided with an intense period of church building in England which was often rationalised as being a response to population growth associated with the Industrial Revolution. At this time the society was optimistically encouraging the building of churches and growth of the faith in anticipation and in response to population growth, as well as a means of re-converting much of the wayward rural population that were in need of redemption. As such, many of its members held a missionary zeal to spread the word of Tractarianism and develop a common faith across the Empire. This period lasted until the early 1860s (after 50 years of intense church building) when the emergence of a secular alternative eroded the power of the church and led to a decrease in church attendance and patronage.

In accordance with the interest of the Tractarian movement in Colonial spheres the Cambridge Camden Society also attempted to spread their influence in this direction. This took the form of dispersing acceptable drawings for a range of ecclesiological correct church designs, including most prominently those of the rural country parish church design, through clerical networks and their own publications to assist in educating and training colonial clergy and architects in ecclesiology. This was particularly achieved through colonial clergy gathering appropriate designs and information on their visits back to England. There was some attempt to provide suitable designs for different climates, but usually faithful English designs were favoured by local populations, despite their unsuitability in some cases.

Ultimately Tractarianism and the Cambridge Camden Society brought about a gradual move towards a more sacramental form of worship and the introduction of a separate choir within the Church of England over the second half of the nineteenth century. This resulted in most churches across England being converted in accordance with the Cambridge Camden Society's requirements (through the construction of new churches or the restoration or remodelling of existing churches) and the substitution of music for speech in common doctrine in accordance with the shift from the word and the pulpit to the altar and the sacraments. Consequently, over this time Tractarianism gradually replaced Evangelicalism as the norm in the Church of England in Britain.

In the colony Tractarianism, despite some crises, continued to develop under Bishop Broughton up until his death in 1853. The new Bishop of Australia was the Evangelical Bishop Barker and he encouraged the Anglican Colonial Church to move towards an Evangelical revival that generally preferred the Low Church approach to Anglican worship.

===== Appendix 2: Richard Cromwell Carpenter (1812–1855) =====
Richard Cromwell Carpenter throughout his career rose to become one of the most prominent ecclesiastical architects in England. He was strongly associated with the Gothic Revival Movement, Victorian High Church, and Cambridge Camden Society.

Carpenter was born in Clerkenwell, London, in 1812 and educated at Charterhouse School. His professional career began in 1827–1828 when he was apprenticed to John Blyth and it was soon discovered that he had an inclination for ecclesiastical architecture. His architectural career began to take off in the 1830s with his first executed commissions being for secular projects. In 1840 he married Amelia Dollman (1821–1891) and together they had four children.

Carpenter's career as an ecclesiastical architect blossomed during the 1840s. Between 1840 and 1841 he was introduced to the Cambridge Camden Society by A. W. N. Pugin, a leading architect of the Gothic Revival movement, and became a convert to the movement and soon one of the society's favoured architects. He was strongly associated with the "High Church" and the Cambridge Camden Society over his career with these connections providing a great many of his firm's commissions. Over his career he designed 28 churches, of which half were built, and several cathedrals, which all remained unexecuted. He also restored 36 churches, two cathedrals, and an abbey. Among his church designs were characteristic plans for town and rural churches that came to mark a "Carpenter" church. His "town" churches were usually substantial hall churches that were intended to be accompanied by a dominant spire. His "rural" churches were an idealised reproduction of a fourteenth century country parish church. They were small and simple and featured a separate chancel and nave and western bell cote, as well as an emphasis on mass in their design. They had the following characteristics: a dominant nave and chancel that featured a structurally evidenced division; aisles that were subsidiary spaces; a bell-cote to summon the laity to worship and which signified the consecration; nave and chancel featuring sharply pitched roofs and aisles with lean-to roofs and a lack of a clerestory; an elevated chancel and raised altar; buttresses serving structural and symbolic purposes; the use of local and honest building materials; and the overall style being first or second pointed.

Towards the end of his career several of Carpenter's designs were included in the Cambridge Camden Society's second edition of the Instrumenta ecclesiastica, which was the premier design book of the society. This edition was published in 1856, a year after Carpenter's death from tuberculosis at the age of 42 at his home in London. At his death some members of the society considered Carpenter architectural skill to be superior to that of Pugin as he was "safer and more equable" and had an exquisite eye for colour. His success was deemed to lie in his ability to ensure the keeping of "the harmony of parts and general unity of proportion" within his designs.

The Church of the Holy Innocents is based on Carpenter's "rural" church design. In particular the design of St John the Baptist, Cookham Dean, Berkshire (1844–1845) which was exported to Australia and resulted in the design of the Church of the Holy Innocents and St John the Baptist, Buckland, Tasmania (1846–1848). Specifically, the followings aspects of the Church of the Holy Innocents are characteristic of this design: the steep roofs (unnecessary in the Australian climate), dominant bell cote and gable cross, symbolic buttresses, wooden porch, and geometric widows. In this manner, the Church of the Holy Innocents is strongly associated with this strand of Carpenter's ecclesiastical career and demonstrative of his notable designs and his connections with the Cambridge Camden Society and Tractarianism.

===== Appendix 3: Edmund Thomas Blacket (1817–1883) =====
Blacket is recognised as one of Australia's leading architects of the nineteenth century, especially in the field of ecclesiological architecture. He was an innovator in ecclesiological architecture from the 1840s through to the 1880s, who, over his long career, produced a large number of high quality churches.

Blacket was born at St Margaret's Hill, Southwark, Surrey, England on 25 August 1817. His father was the merchant James Blacket and his mother was Margaret Harriet (nee Ralph). He was educated at Mill Hill Congregational College and then spent three years in the family trade business before deciding to pursue a different calling. Initially he found employment in his brother's mill in Yorkshire before joining the Stockton and Darlington Railway Company around 1837 as a surveyor and engineer. While working for this company he became a skilled draftsman and surveyor, which were skills that were to serve him admirably later in life. His success as an engineer prompted his father to reward him with the funds to undertake a year travelling England sketching and recording details of medieval architecture. Between 1838 and 1841 he undertook many similar smaller journeys during which he produced many picturesque sketches of medieval architecture. After leaving Yorkshire in 1841 Blacket spent a year in London employed in inspecting schools for the Archbishop of Canterbury.

Blacket married Sarah Mease (1818–1869) on 21 May 1842 at Holy Trinity Church, Wakefield, Yorkshire, after overcoming considerable opposition to the match amongst both families. His father's reluctant approval allegedly required that Blacket leave the country, but it is also possible that the new couple sought the opportunities of the new Australian colony for their own purposes. Soon after they married, Edmund and Sarah sailed to Sydney, arriving on 3 November 1842. Blacket is thought to have carried letters of introduction to Bishop Broughton and Charles Nicholson, which allowed him to be appointed valuator to Bourke ward, Sydney and, most importantly, the inspector of the Church of England schools in the colony at the start of 1843. This position required that he design and supervise the construction of many school buildings, parsonages, and churches, and he was allowed to establish a private practice in May 1843. This role allowed him to present his architectural skills to Bishop Broughton who at the time was undertaking a rigorous campaign of church building and required someone with good architectural skills to assist him. Therefore, Blacket was soon able to establish a modest architectural practice and become known colloquially as the "Church Architect". Over the following years, he won respect for his sound work on a number of commissions and demonstrated his outstanding knowledge of Gothic styles through the construction of a number of new churches, as well as the redesign and completion of a number of unfinished cathedrals. This led him to be officially appointed Diocese architect by Bishop Broughton in 1847.

On 1 December 1849 Blacket was appointed Colonial Architect, replacing Mortimer Lewis, and he remained in this position until September 1854. During this time he remained Diocese architect and continued to oversee work on a number of cathedrals and churches he has begun previously to this appointment. However, generally, this period was a time of stagnation in the colony's building industry due to the gold rushes that drew away the local workforce. On 30 September 1854 Blacket became The University of Sydney official architect, while retaining the right of private practice, and he subsequently designed many of its original buildings. From this time his reputation spread and grew throughout the colony and his architectural practice thrived accepting commissions on schools, colleges, banks, hospitals, commercial buildings, domestic buildings, and numerous Anglican churches. This diversity of work allowed him to be more creative architecturally and further develop the Gothic style in his ecclesiological work, while also experimenting with the Italianate style for commercial buildings.

Sarah Blacket died in 1869 leaving Edmund with four sons and four daughters to raise and provide for. Three of his sons, Cyril (1858–1937), Arthur, and Owen, spent time in Blacket's practice. Cyril had joined the practice in 1872 and afterwards spent time travelling Britain, Western Europe, and North America, before returning in 1880 and becoming a partner. This caused the firm to become Blacket & Son. Edmund passed away only a few years later, on 9 February 1883, at his home in Petersham. Blacket was a stout and steadfast Anglican known for his good public character. He was respected and admired across the colony for his honesty, diligence, accuracy, fortitude, and propriety. Through his architectural career he scattered the colony with many handsome gothic churches and fulfilled one of his life's great ambitions.

Blacket was a self-taught architect and dedicated adherent of the "archaeological" or correct school of Gothic architecture and was in this way not a Tractarian, but an Anglican of the Established Church. Archaeological gothic was the Early Victorian fashion, as publicised by the Camden Cambridge Society, and required strict adherence to and understanding of medieval gothic styles. As an archaeological gothicist Blacket's goal when building new churches was to create replicas of English medieval parish churches. To accomplish this during the early portion of his career (up to around 1860) Blacket operated by basing his designs on existing English churches (usual contemporary Gothic Revival churches) and then incorporating published medieval details available in copy or pattern books, magazines, newspapers, or his own note books. This was the approach any colonial architect had to use when designing a gothic building in Australia. While operating in this manner Blacket created some beautiful and imposing churches and he was particularly well known for his meticulous detailing and how he exploited good craftsmanship to reveal the intrinsic qualities of building materials. Blacket had a deep knowledge of gothic architecture and he continued to keep abreast of developments in the Gothic Revival movement and this allowed him to consistently, knowledgably, and effectively piece together the stylistic motifs of his churches.

During the early stage of his colonial career Blacket's ecclesiological work was dominated by Bishop Broughton and his amateur architectural desires and motivations for the colonial church based on his High Church ideals and support for the Cambridge Camden Society and Tractarian movement. Broughton's connections in England (and his trips back there) allowed him to keep abreast of ecclesiological advances which influenced his designs for ecclesiological architecture in the colony. Blacket's youth, inexperience, and social obligations required that he submit to Broughton's architectural designs and the requests of other clerics and influential laymen that he design exact replicas of notable English village churches. Consequently, between 1843 and 1845 Blacket was merely involved in drawing up designs developed or provided by Bishop Broughton and ensuring that they were faithfully and competently built. The trend for English replicas in ecclesiological architecture continued through the 1840s and 1850s due to the English and Anglican backgrounds of Blacket's clients. This was in order to recall the glories of medieval England, as well as demonstrate the manner of proper Anglican worship. In time Blacket became the leading colonial architect specialising in catering to this Anglomania.

The 1840s was Blacket's time of major experimentation. It is possible to view his early ecclesiological works as experiments with the wide range of forms and styles permitted within the strict English tradition and precepts of the Gothic Revival. This was despite the fact that the majority of the churches he designed during this period were replicas of English designs. These churches and cathedrals were created by following specific designs sent from England or available in magazines, newspapers, and pattern books. This was in accordance with the dictates of the premier Camden Cambridge Society architects, such as Pugin, who encourage the following of English tradition in church design and not personal originality. Overall, Blacket's work during this period allowed him to develop a series of prototypes for specific styles he would consistently use throughout his career.

After Blacket became Diocese architect in 1847 and Colonial Architect in 1849 he grew in confidence and assurance and began to be more resolute with relation to his design choices for new buildings, allowing him to express his own voice. His time as colonial architect did not produce many public buildings, but it was successful in terms of routine maintenance and administration. Bishop Broughton died in 1853 and his successor Bishop Frederic Barker abhorred Tractarians and ecclesiologists and had no interest in architecture which gave Blacket free rein on further church designs. However, he still heavily favoured Gothic designs over the rest of his career according to his conviction that Early English styles were proper for small churches and Perpendicular styles for collegiate buildings.

During the 1850s and 1860s Blacket moved beyond imitation utilising his experience from the 1840s to create his own vision of the English medieval parish church based on his own repertoire of designs and building details. This resulted in him refining a type of small stone rural church that was to be reproduced a large number of times across different areas of the colony throughout the remainder of this career. These churches were based on the medieval English ideal and featured "separately-roofed parts, little bellcotes, gabled roofs, and pointed windows" and Blacket's variant was perfect for the predominately rural NSW colony. This became the archetypal Victorian Church of NSW and it was continually requested by Blacket's clients. The 1860s also became the era of the Blacket town church which became archetypal among Anglicans throughout the rest of Blacket's Career. By this time, as ecclesiological architecture moved away from Pugin's strict emulative medievalism, more innovative and original Gothic Revival churches were beginning to be produced in the High Victorian style. Blacket kept up with this architectural trend throughout the late 1860s and 1870s actively bringing in the High Victorian style into his ecclesiological work. Unfortunately, Blacket's later churches are less inventive or varied than his early ones as once he became the dominant authority on ecclesiological architecture in the colony he tended to safely reproduce churches of particular styles based on the design repertoire he developed in his youth.

In conclusion, Kerr (1983:13) has characterised Blacket's architectural career as containing three periods: the 1840s experimental period which created the most important churches for the development of church architecture in the colony of the time; the 1850s–1860s period of individual expression and development of a repertoire of designs for specific building types and features which resulted in the construction of his most loved churches; and the late 1860s to early 1880s experimentation with High Victorian Gothic styles which created his major ecclesiological works.

== Description ==
This item comprises the Church of the Holy Innocents (and its original furnishings), its associated cemetery and churchyard, and the archaeological site of the original slab timber school/church hall. These features are situated on four lots which were granted to the Church of England in 1848 under the 1836 Church Act. They are nonsequentially arranged from north to south as 1, 4, 2, and 3.

=== Archaeological site of the original school/church hall ===
The original slab timber school/church hall was constructed in 1827 by the Clergy and School Lands Corporation. It was located in the southeast corner of the original 1825 Church Reserve and is thought to have been a simple, cheap, multipurpose building like others constructed by the corporation. According to oral tradition it was destroyed by a bushfire in 1931 after it had been replaced by a new Church Hall in c. 1886.

Its archaeological remains are potentially extant within the churchyard in the southeast corner of the current Lot 4. This area comprises an indistinct flat platform area adjacent to two pepper trees. Unfortunately, no archaeological features or artefacts are evident besides this platform. However, this site could feasibly contain archaeological resources such as foundation remains and preserved construction materials including post-holes, hearths, or wall-base slots. Other occupational deposits, such as underfloor layers or rubbish pits, may also be present within, and surrounding, the site.

=== Cemetery ===
The cemetery was originally contained within the western half of the original church reserve (the present Lot 4) to the rear of the original school/church yard. The first known burial in the cemetery was conducted in 1829 and it continued to be used throughout the nineteenth and twentieth centuries. A few burials are present from the twenty-first century, with the most recent being from 2007. The cemetery continues in use today and is mostly confined to Lot 4, but intrudes slightly into Lot 2.

Due to how the cemetery was originally located at the rear of the original church reserve, burials have spread from the rear fence of the churchyard towards the Church Street frontage over time. After the construction of the Church of the Holy Innocents in 1848–1850 this involved the burials spreading along its south side in the area that provided access to the church (via the porch). Some burials are located directly behind the church, and a few are present on its north side (where the vestry entrance is located). As such, the oldest burials in the cemetery, which comprise a typical variety of Georgian and Early Victorian graves and monuments, with some featuring fine detailing, are located in the rear section. This section includes graves for a number of members of the original pioneer families of the local area such as the Bells from nearby Bellfield Farm. Burials from the early twentieth century are located closer to the west side of the church and around the current path from the church porch to the parking area. The most recent burials are located on the east side of the cemetery.

In all, the cemetery comprises approximately 100 extant graves or memorials. Those with visible inscriptions date from the 1840s through to the recent past. However, there are several sandstone graves that are now too eroded for their inscriptions to be made out. Around a dozen headstones have also fallen over and become disassociated with their original graves. Some of these are lying across the cemetery and others have been rested up against the north side of the church. The remaining graves and headstones range in condition from poor to good with subsidence being a major issue. A fair number of headstones are listing to one side and are in danger of collapsing. However, there are plans in 2017 for conservation works by the Diocese of Sydney to stabilise these headstones. Remarkably the cemetery has suffered little to no vandalism likely due to its semi-rural location. According to available historical records there must be a fair number of unmarked graves in the cemetery, particularly those dating to the earliest periods of use (late 1820s–1840s).

An unusual hardwood engraved gravestone is preserved in the vestry that possibly belongs to John McKaughan and dates to 1848. It is unknown where this gravestone was originally located.

As of a site inspection on 28 November 2016 the cemetery has recently been subjected to good gardening maintenance following the acquisition of the property by the Diocese of Sydney. This has resulted in the removal of much of the previous vegetation overgrowth at the rear of the cemetery and the general cleaning-up of the whole area.

=== Churchyard ===
The churchyard is confined mostly within Lot 4 (but perhaps partially within Lot 2) and is generally well kept and features scattered various tree plantings, but mostly eucalyptus. However, due to a lack of fencing around this feature it blends into the undeveloped Lot 1 to the north and the carpark and modern buildings to the south in Lots 2 and 3. As such, today the Churchyard is to some degree indistinct and difficult to demarcate, where in the past it featured fences to separate it from the surrounding lots.

The church property only features a complete fence along its west and south boundaries: on the west side this consists of a modern wire fence and on the south side a modern corrugated metal fence. However, there are elements of an older fence along the east boundary which is evident as a long low mound. Other extant fence elements include corner posts at the north and south ends and four matching posts and a surviving panel of a white picket fence in poor condition around the driveway entrance to the churchyard. These large hardwood posts have decorative "onion dome" carved tops and their associated picket fence features turned timber pickets. Square wooden posts from a former picket gate are also located at the rear of the cemetery along the west boundary of the property where a former grass pathway from the church porch to the rear of the property was located.

A modern driveway leads from the front gate of the churchyard to the south side of the church. A few remnant pine and cypress trees from former more extensive plantings along this feature are extant along its length. Another paved path leads from the church porch to the dirt carpark on Lot 2 adjacent the new Church Hall. It bisects the early 20th Century section of the cemetery. One or two pine trees from former extensive plantings along the Church Street frontage are also extant.

The southern Lots 2 and 3 contain the dirt carpark, brick rectory (1987), and stone and brick church hall (1980s). The rectory is currently leased out to tenants and the Church Hall is leased to the local Baptist Church for services and other community uses. The brick rectory, stone and brick church hall, and dirt carpark do not add to the significance of the place and are considered to be non-contributory features.

The northern Lot 1 is undeveloped and is covered in a small stand of immature eucalyptus trees (dating to after the 1940s). Recently the grass beneath them has been mowed back and cleaned up removing any high grass or low bushes. This lot is considered to add to the significant setting of the church and is a contributory feature.

=== The Church of the Holy Innocents ===
The following is summarised from the 1989 Conservation Study by Noel Bell, Ridley Scott & Partners except where otherwise noted. It includes comparisons of the Church of the Holy Innocents with the available historical drawings of Carpenter's design for the Church of St John the Baptist, Cookham Dean that illustrate how Blacket reinterpreted and amended this design adding his own distinct flavour to the church.

=== Exterior ===
The Church of the Holy Innocents is a small rural church with a two-bay nave, a disproportionally large chancel/sanctuary, a north vestry, a south open timber porch, and a simple brick bell-cote at the western end of its steep shingled gabled roof. It is orientated in the traditional manner, east-west, with the sanctuary at the east end. The layout of the church is of the English type (rather than the antipodean) with the porch on the south side of the nave, the vestry on the north side of the chancel, and the pulpit in the northeast corner of the nave. Usually in Australia these features are on the opposite sides.

The church is founded on clay or slate and is built on brick foundations. It features a sandstone plinth course with a chamfered weather which projects out from the walls. Above this is a slate damp proof course. The church walls are constructed of fine-quality red-blue mottle sandstock bricks within a soft lime mortar in English bond face brickwork. They are reinforced with engaged brick buttresses placed at all the corner returns and along the wall length at regular intervals. At sill height along the nave walls and the east wall of the chancel is a continuous projecting sandstone string course. The entire church also features sandstone tracery and trimmings on the doors, windows, and buttress caps. The brickwork at the top of the walling is corbelled out to form the eaves detail and support the thrust of the roof framing. Overall, the buttress and string courses of stone trim break the wall at regular intervals and create a pleasing contrast . The bricks used in the church construction are of a very regular gauge (230 x 65mm) showing that they are of good quality. The sandstone dressings on the building have been tooled to a very high standard, but the very fine grained sandstone if of an inferior quality. It was quarried locally at Cobbitty. The use of brick, highlighted with sandstone, to construct the church is illustrative of Blacket's adaption of the Cookham Dean design (which was built in stone) to suit local conditions.

All six church windows are of a gothic style and feature elaborate stone tracery. The four nave windows and the single example in the vestry all have two lights and simple quatrefoil tracery in the heads. The large east chancel or sanctuary window is far more detailed with three lights and a very elaborate tracery panel (varied quatrefoil) and features a brightly coloured geometric glass design. This glass design was funded by the women of the parish in 1850.

Research by Robin Hedditch suggests that the stained glass east window was likely locally made by a glazier using a restricted palette of coloured stained glass. These types of windows are characterised by the use of plain, unpainted coloured (stained glass), a restricted colour palette, and simple geometric patterns favouring straight lines. During this period it was costly to import stained glass windows from Britain and there were no trained stained glass artists in the colony until the early 1840s. Consequently, many churches built during this time conquered this situation by employing a local glazier (lead and plumbing tradesmen) to make a "stained glass" window using local materials. These materials consisted of sheets of imported stained glass in a limited range of colours (generally crimson, purple, green, blue, yellow, and amber) that the glazier would cut into simple, non-figurative, geometric designs. This naive style was shortlived as by the 1850s the goldrushes brought wealth to the colony and the ability to commission windows from Britain or from newly arrived British trained stained glass artists. This research is ongoing and when completed could prove that this style of stained glass windows represents a rare, local response to the fashionable Gothic Revival movement by non-trained glass artists using locally available materials. This could mean that the east window is one of the earliest known surviving examples of "stained glass" in Australia while also being a rare example of naive 1840s locally made stained glass windows. The east window is also likely an excellent example of this naive style as the local glazier when to great lengths to create a suitably rich, gothic design with the limited means available. The glazier was also largely successful in devising simple lead lines to showcase the rich, but limited, colour range of available stained glass. The design also appears to be attempting to emulate the highly prized "mosaic" effect that was a hallmark of Gothic Revival windows combined with a Victorian love of "crazy" design. The glazier's skills is also apparent in the use of clear glass in the background to highlight the bright colours and the repeating geometric pattern. This creates an effect of restless colour within a strong vertical repeating framework that is impressive within the church given its size and the east window being its main decorative object (submission provided by Robin Hedditch).

Another element of the church design elaborated by Blacket is the well-shaped hood moulds terminating in an uncarved label stop which each window features. This is a common Blacket detail that was designed to allow the carving of bosses or decorative features in the future. Blacket's reinterpretation of the design is also evident in the internal form of the windows as each features chamfered stone reveals that follow the external gothic pointed arch. In contrast, the windows on Carpenter's drawings have revealing arches. All the church windows feature wire mesh security fittings on the exterior. One of the north windows in the nave and the vestry window have been modified and fitted with a small rectangular hinged section to allow air flow into the building.

The church features three doors: two external and one internal. All are constructed of solid cedar (60mm thick) and are ledged and hung internally and close boarded externally and retain their original Gothic style hardware. The external arched porch entry door is of a double door type, and hung on hard forged decorative "gothic" strap hinges and features catches and a rim lock. It originally was grained in imitation of oak but is now painted. The single type external vestry door is of a similar design but is square headed. Due to its greater exposure to the elements this door is showing signs of weathering and is deteriorating. It appears to have had one panel replaced in the recent past in an unsympathetic manner. The single type interior arched vestry door is similar to the other doors, but its external face is different with it featuring alternating higher and lower panels (a ribbed design).

Each of the gabled roofs of the church (nave, chancel, vestry, and porch) are pitched at 60 degrees in order to give perfect balance to the proportion of the wall below. The nave roof is the highest indicating its importance as the home of the congregation. Each of the three other roofs break down far below the line of the nave roof indicating their subordinate function. The roofs were originally covered in hardwood shingles, but those on the nave were replaced in the 1940s with asbestos shingles. The nave roof is capped with a rolled ridge capping and features a fine stone capped bell cote at its western end. The east end of the Nave roof originally featured a stone cross that was removed sometime after the 1970s. In contrast to Cookham Dean this bellcote is provided with added emphasis by being separated from the main wall plane by the gable verge. This change is further evidence of the refinement of the design by Blacket as he commonly used this design feature on smaller churches throughout his career. Otherwise the bell cote is in keeping with the Carpenter "Rural" church design of the church. The bell cote was restored in 1991 as part of works on the west facade.

The hardwood (cedar) shingles covering the chancel, vestry, and porch roofs were removed during restoration work between 1991 and 1993 and replaced with hardwood "she oak" shakes. Unfortunately, this replacement lining on these roofs has now become weathered and is deteriorating. However, there are plans by the Diocese of Sydney to undertake conservation works in the near future. The chancel roof appears to be in good condition except for its guttering on the north side which has become dislodged at the east end and is caught on the vestry roof.

The timber framed open porch is finely detailed and features a sharply pitched timber shingled roof and stone flagging. It leads straight into the southern entry of the nave. While today this feature is open its lower panels were originally filled in with cedar planking to make this structure half-open. It was completely restored in 1992–1993 which involved it being dismantled and rebuilt with any deteriorating elements being replaced with appropriate replacements. This restoration process also involved re-levelling and re-aligning the porch with the chancel entrance. This porch is different from the Carpenter drawings and marks another refinement or amendment of the design by Blacket. It is markedly different in terms of proportion (being far larger in relation to the church proportionally than its Cookham Dean counterpart) and is far less elaborate as it lacks the carvings and cusping of Cookham Dean. Comparatively this feature of the church is likely unique for this period (late 1840s) in NSW/Australia.

=== Internal ===
The church interior is generally plain or restrained in detail and economical in style, but is well proportioned and fitted out. Originally, the internal walls were lime washed and the stone window reveals bare, but both these surfaces have been painted in the recent past. The interior walls of the nave have also been rendered to create a dado to counteract rising damp. The exposed, stained, hammer beam truss roof ceiling and the dark Australian red cedar interior furnishings provide a pleasing contrast to the otherwise white interior of the church. This interior design of the church would have almost wholly been the responsibility of Blacket as the Cookham Dean drawings to not provide any details or instructions on how the church interior was fitted out.

The entire interior space of the church is floored with sandstone flagging. On top of this in the nave are two banks of open timber seating on raised timber platforms. Open pews on raised timber boxes such as these are common in Blacket churches and are evident of his addition to Carpenter's design. This design also results in the centre of the nave featuring a narrow stone flagged aisle leading to the chancel. On the north and south sides of the nave exterior small modern ventilation holes have been created to air the space beneath these timber platforms. At the rear of the nave in the southwest corner is a large sandstone font designed in a fourteenth century style by Blacket directly adjacent the interior entrance from the porch. This beautifully carved feature has in the past been considered to be over elaborate when compared to the general plain and economical nature of the church interior. A simple Australian red cedar pulpit is located in the northeast corner on a raised sandstone platform and is accessed by possibly concrete steps (these may be a modern addition). The pulpit has been lowered sometime in the recent past by around 50 cm as indicated by marking on the surrounding walls.

The nave contains several memorials fitted on to its walls including:

An honour roll inscribed with the names of 23 men from the district who served in both World Wars (north wall).

A marble plaque sacred to the memory of Lieutenant William Brown who fell at Mouquet, France, on 3 September 1916 (north wall).

A marble plaque sacred to the memory of Henry Robert Lowe, born 2 November 1831 – died 19 October 1880, of "Briling" Farm (east wall); and

A marble plaque scared to the memory of Laura Lowe, born 1830 – died 9 July 1902 (south wall).

The chancel is separated from the nave by a brick chancel arch. This section of the church is narrower than the nave and two steps higher. The sanctuary is separated from the chancel by another step and a low cedar communion rail (sacred to the memory of Mr and Mrs A. V. McCann – 1962). Within the sanctuary there is a decorative carved stone sedilia on its southern wall and decorative plaster dados on the walls. During the site inspection on 28 November 2016 a small range of furniture was arranged throughout the chancel and sanctuary, including four chairs, an alms box, a pray kneeler, and a rectangular timber altar along the east wall of the sanctuary, beneath the window. Generally the existing furniture, with the exception of the modern communion table, is similar to that described in Munro's accounts suggesting that they are original. In 1989 the original communion table was known to survive, but its location was not mentioned.

As of 1989 the original High Victorian Gothic design communion set survived and was still in use. They comprised a solid silver Chalice and Pattern housed in a wooden carry case and were of English manufacture and possibly of an A. W. G. Pugin design. Within the chancel are also two small brass vases and a brass cross that lack any subscriptions and a book of common prayer scared to the memory of Charles Henry Thorsby. The alms dish, bible, and prayer book in the church are all thought to be original furnishings.

The vestry opens off the north side of the chancel and during the site inspection (28 November 2016) was used partially as storage. It is decorated in the same manner as the nave and chancel, but its sandstone flagging appears to be subsiding in the northwest corner and the walls in the southwest corner have been water damaged from a leak in the roof.

The church ceiling consists of a simplified hammer beam roof with close butted boarding and an arched brace and collar tie. This design is considered to be extremely fine and is evidently more elaborate than Carpenter's drawings indicating that it is another refinement of this design by Blacket.

=== Condition ===
As at 10 July 2017, The Church of the Holy Innocents retains most of its original fabric and has not been modified in an extensive manner. However, poor maintenance during the recent past has resulted in the deterioration of some of the wooden elements of the structure, such as the porch, chapel, and vestry roofs, and external vestry door. This has in turn resulted in some water and pest damage to the church interior, particularly along the south wall of the chancel and the southwest corner of the vestry. However, recent efforts by the Diocese of Sydney at improving maintenance of the church has enhanced its condition and there are plans to conduct restoration works on the church and its grounds in the near future.

The Church of the Holy Innocents has good integrity and intactness as the majority of its original fabric is extant. The churchyard has fair integrity and intactness as it retains most of its original fabric, but is in need of maintenance works. The churchyard has only poor integrity and intactness as its boundary fence has been removed, although it still exists as an open space.

=== Modifications and dates ===
The Church of the Holy Innocents features no major modifications – it is still largely original in form – although there have been some small alterations to different aspects of the building (i.e., removal of the stone cross on the nave roof, lowering of the pulpit, replacement of the original cedar shingles on the nave roof with asbestos shingles, etc.).

Previously, there have been three renovation projects undertaken to restore the church: one in the late 1940s, one in the 1960s, and the other in the early 1990s.

In 1946, prior to the celebrations for the centenary of the church, a refurbishment project was undertaken. This involved restoring the roof, repairing the stone flagging, and re-varnishing the ceiling

The third phase of restoration works proceeded from the conservation study undertaken in 1989. It had identified several elements of the building that required urgent attention, and consequently, between 1990 and 1993, work was undertaken to:

- Replace damaged stonework on the bell turret;
- Repair or replace damaged flashing;
- Repair or replace damaged eaves material;
- Repair the pointing to damaged brickwork to a high level;
- Level the font to avoid further damage or collapse; and
- Relay uneven stone flagging and remove cement pointing.

These works were undertaken with the assistance of a financial grant from the Heritage Council (Heritage Assistance Program) and were conducted in a sympathetic manner.

Until recently, this item existed in an open rural setting, but the surrounding landscape has been progressively becoming semi-rural over the past few decades as development has extended along Bringelly Road associated with the proposed second Sydney airport at Badgerys Creek.

== Heritage listing ==
As at 28 July 2017, The Church of the Holy Innocents, churchyard, and cemetery is of state heritage significance because of its historical, associative, technical, aesthetic, research, rarity, and representative values. The church is the result of an unusual partnership of two prominent ecclesiastical architects: Richard Cromwell Carpenter, one of the leading English architects of the Cambridge Camden Society, and Edmund Blacket, the most prominent Australian ecclesiastical architect of the nineteenth century. It is the only church in NSW based on a design by Richard Cromwell Carpenter and only one of three in Australia. This church is one of the earliest Gothic Revival churches in NSW recognised as being correct in its medieval detail and thus, an important, rare and representative example of this new wave of church architecture. Its highly detailed, Gothic Revival design renders it remarkable in a state context as a small rural church. The church is also designed according to the principles of the Tractarian Movement, facilitating a change in liturgical emphasis from the pulpit and the spoken word, to the altar and the sacraments associated with a separate choir. The application of a Tractarian design in this small rural church embodies wider debates within the Church of England under Bishop Broughton. The church is also strongly associated with the main group of proponents of the Gothic Revival and Tractarian Movements operating in, or in association with, the Church of England during the 1840s in NSW: Bishop Broughton, Edmund Blacket, Reverend Horatio Walsh, and Reverend George Vidal.

The church, churchyard, cemetery, and archaeological site are associated with several important pieces of legislation relating to the governance and position of religion, and specifically the Church of England, in colonial society during the early nineteenth century. As such, these original features and the church land is able to tell a story about the changing nature of religion and the position of the Church of England in the early colony. The retention of the semi-rural nature of the church, churchyard, and cemetery into the twenty-first century also demonstrates the historic rural landscape and isolation that made the finely designed Gothic Revival Church of the Holy Innocents a remarkable and rare place of worship.

Church of the Holy Innocents was listed on the New South Wales State Heritage Register on 24 August 2018 having satisfied the following criteria.

The place is important in demonstrating the course, or pattern, of cultural or natural history in New South Wales.

The Church of the Holy Innocents is of State historical significance due to its Tractarian design that forms an important early example of this type of architecture in NSW. Bishop Broughton's decision to use the English Tractarian design of Richard Cromwell Carpenter illustrates the progressive changes in the Church of England during this period associated with the Tractarian Movement and Cambridge Camden Society, which controversially promoted a change in liturgical emphasis from the pulpit and the spoken word to the altar and the sacraments associated with a separate choir. Through its design, this church reflects contemporary debates within the Church of England under Bishop Broughton.

The Church of the Holy Innocents is an important early example of the Colonial Church's participation in the Gothic Revival movement, which was Empire wide in scope. The Gothic Revival movement, under the influence of Edmund Blacket, was to dominate ecclesiastical architecture in the colony for the majority of the nineteenth century.

This item is of State historical significance as the site and its development materially demonstrate a range of early nineteenth century legislation related to church building, religious development, and the provision of education within the colony of NSW. The original small reserve for the church, cemetery, and school within the Cabramatta village reserve from 1825 is linked to the restructuring of the colonial surveying system carried out by Governor Brisbane. The archaeological remains of the slab timber church/school hall and the early portion of the cemetery are linked to the Clergy and School Lands Corporation (1826–1833), and the Church of the Holy Innocents and the land from the second land grant are linked to the 1836 Church Act.

In this manner, the item illustrates the attempts by Colonial authorities during this period to develop and improve the colony's moral condition through the establishment of strong religious institutions that had a widespread presence throughout society. It also demonstrates the slow loss of pre-eminence of the Church of England in the colony during this period.

The place has a strong or special association with a person, or group of persons, of importance of cultural or natural history of New South Wales's history.

The Church of the Holy Innocents and its stone font potentially have a strong historical association of State significance with Edmund Thomas Blacket (1817–1883), a prominent ecclesiastical architect renowned for his contributions to the Gothic Revival movement. As Diocesan Architect, Blacket adapted and executed Richard Cromwell Carpenter's design for the Church of the Holy Innocents, and he oversaw its construction as Diocese and then Colonial Architect. While it is still recognisably a rural "Carpenter" church, Blacket's elaboration of Carpenter's design is clearly apparent. This church belongs to the experimental period of Blacket's career when he was still developing his design repertoire and confidence in Gothic Revival architecture. It could be considered to be one of his early successes in Gothic Revival architecture as it has been described as "perfect a mediaeval replica as was ever realised in the colony". Blacket also designed the church's stone font, as well as potentially all the internal fittings and furniture. This item is one of the finest small rural churches Blacket built over his long career.

The church is also strongly associated with the main group of proponents of the Gothic Revival and Tractarian Movements operating in, or in association with, the Church of England during the 1840s in NSW. This group included Bishop Broughton, the main promoter of the Gothic Revival; the Reverend Horatio Walsh a leading Tractarian in the Colonial church; Edmund Blacket, the leading architect of the Gothic Revival; and the Reverend George Vidal, the first minister of the church and a well-known Tractarian and promoter of the Gothic Revival. These clergy and architects encouraged the use of Carpenter's design for this church and oversaw its successful completion as part of a wider effort of promoting these two movements within the Church of England.

The place is important in demonstrating aesthetic characteristics and/or a high degree of creative or technical achievement in New South Wales.

The Church of the Holy Innocents is of technical significance at a state level due to its Tractarian design which was cutting edge at the time. This design was approved by the Cambridge Camden Society, and prepared by one of their favoured architects, Richard Cromwell Carpenter. While many of the other churches Blacket designed early in his career were based on English designs in the same manner, they do not have the architectural precedents of the Church of the Holy Innocents, which is recognisably a "Carpenter" church embodying the principles of the Tractarian Movement. Thus, it is archetypal of the early stages in NSW of the Empire-wide Gothic Revival movement that was to dominate ecclesiastical architecture in the colony for the next several decades. Its architecture and its high level of detailing for a small rural church renders it exceptional within the state context – the vast majority of small churches were built to vernacular designs with much less exacting attention to construction.

Historically the Church of the Holy Innocents was also notable aesthetically for its rural location and backdrop that expressed its isolation, and made this a unique place of worship. Over recent decades this rural landscape has been gradually developed to the stage that it is now semi-rural in nature, but the historic rural and isolated nature of this place is still intact through the undeveloped lot to the north.

The place has potential to yield information that will contribute to an understanding of the cultural or natural history of New South Wales.

As the only church associated with Richard Cromwell Carpenter within NSW, and only one of three in Australia, the Church of the Holy Innocents has great research potential within the context of Gothic Revival architecture, and the state's ecclesiastical architecture in general. It can also contribute positively to the study of the Tractarian Movement and High Church within the Church of England in the colony during the early nineteenth century.

The archaeological site of the slab timber school/church hall potentially has good research potential due to its connection with the Clergy and School Lands Corporation. The corporation primarily built plain, cheap, and multi-purpose school/church buildings during its existence between 1826 and 1833 and reportedly only one of these is extant. This archaeological site potentially provides an important resource to investigate the simple wooden buildings erected during this program through any foundation remains or construction materials preserved at the site (post-holes, hearths, wall base slots, etc.). Through other occupational deposits (underfloor layers or rubbish pits) it also has the potential to provide information on activities undertaken within the structure throughout its lifetime.

The place possesses uncommon, rare or endangered aspects of the cultural or natural history of New South Wales.

The Church of the Holy Innocents is rare in NSW as an early small scale rural Gothic Revival church and a small rural church of a Tractarian design. It is also rare in the context of NSW ecclesiastical architecture as being the only church in NSW, and one of three in Australia, based on a design by Richard Cromwell Carpenter. This design had been purposefully imported to the Colony by the adherents of the Tractarian movement to stimulate the construction of ecclesiastically correct churches in the Australian context.

The place is important in demonstrating the principal characteristics of a class of cultural or natural places/environments in New South Wales.

The Church of the Holy Innocents is representative in the state context as a small rural church of Gothic Revival design of good integrity and intactness. It is representative of a well-designed and executed small rural church, innovative in its application of Tractarian design principles. Most other small rural churches of this period were of vernacular design. Its design is also representative of the early stages of the Gothic Revival and Tractarian Movements in the Church of England in the colony during the 1840s and the expression of the values and goals of these movements in the context of a small rural church.

== See also ==
- Australian non-residential architectural styles
