= Newstead, New South Wales =

Newstead New South Wales
- Coordinates: 29°49′7″S 151°20′18″E
- Population: 23 (2016 census)
- Postcode(s): 2360
- LGA(s): Inverell Shire
- State electorate(s): Northern Tablelands
- Federal division(s): New England

Newstead is a locality located in the Inverell Shire of New South Wales.
