= Church of the Holy Innocents (Brooklyn) =

Church in Brooklyn, New York

- U.S. National Register of Historic Places
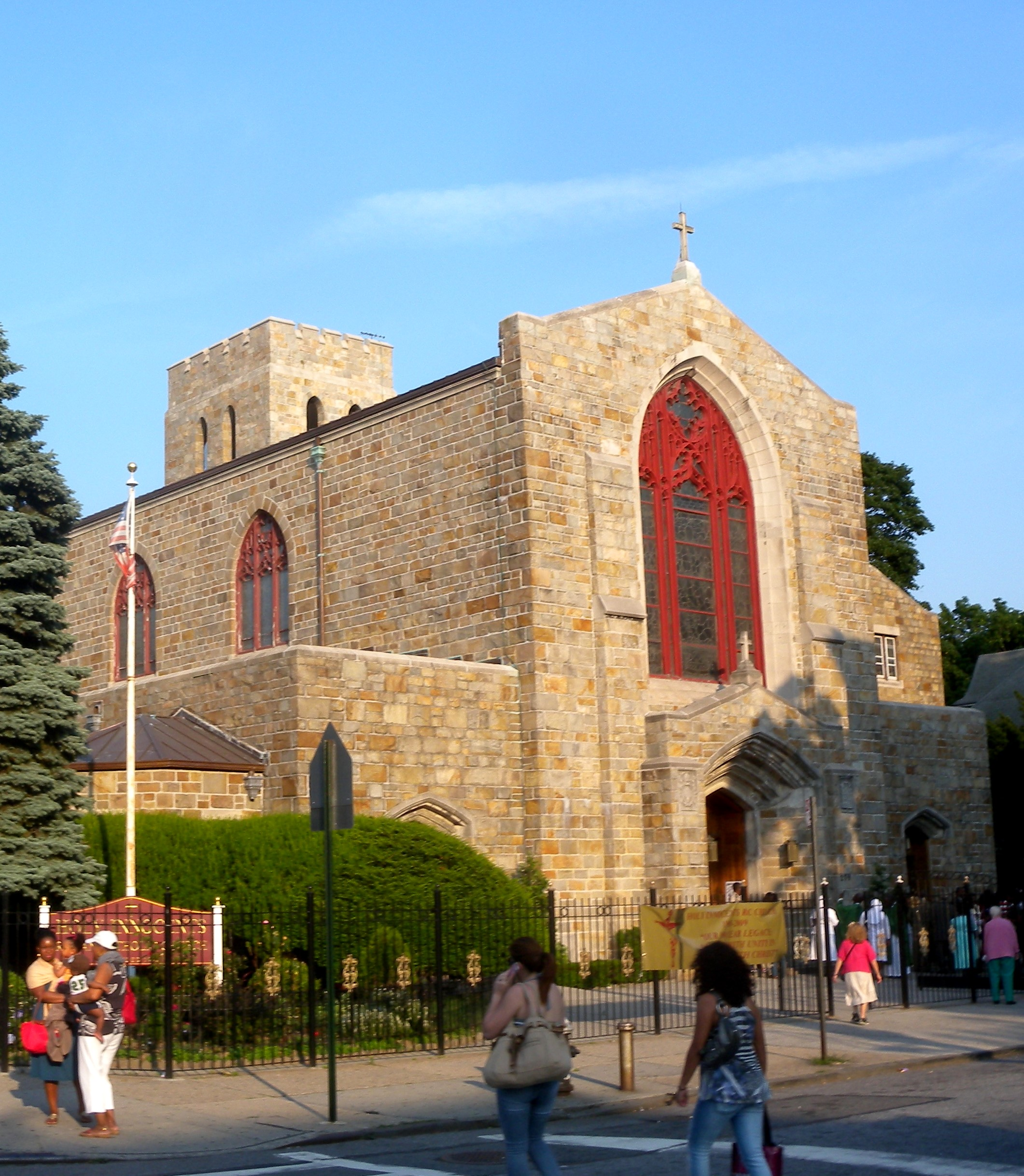

- Location within New York City Location within New York Location within the United States
- Location: 279 E. 17th St., Brooklyn, New York
- Coordinates: 40°38′39″N 73°57′46″W
- Area: 1.5 acres (0.61 ha)
- Built: 1914
- Architect: Helmle and Corbett
- Architectural style: Late Gothic Revival
- NRHP reference No.: 05000617
- Added to NRHP: June 16, 2005

Church of the Holy Innocents is a historic Roman Catholic parish church in the Diocese of Brooklyn located at 279 E. 17th St. in Flatbush, Brooklyn, New York, New York. The church was built in 1923 in the Late Gothic Revival style. It is built of granite with limestone trim. It consists of a tall, clerestoried nave with gable roof, lower flat-roofed side aisles, transepts, chancel, and a tall bell tower. Attached to the church is a rectory (1923) and school (1914).

It was listed on the National Register of Historic Places in 2007.

== Music ==
The organ at Holy Innocents Church was built in 1922 by the Ernest M. Skinner Organ Company of Boston, Massachusetts as their Opus 390 3 manuals, 33 stops, 32 ranks. The instrument was rebuilt in 2005 by the Peragallo Pipe Organ Company of Paterson, NJ. As of April 6, 2018, the Director of Music is Dr. Alfred E. Cresci, himself a 1968 graduate of Holy Innocents School.

The organ is primarily used for the Saturday 5pm Mass in English, the Sunday 8am Mass in English, the 9:30am Mass in Spanish and the 11:30am Mass in English. The English Adult Choir which is heavily dependent on the organ for choral accompaniment, is one of the longest running in Brooklyn, beginning its existence in 1973.

== In popular culture ==
The Holy Innocents Church appeared in several episodes of the AMC television show Mad Men as the church that character Peggy Olson and her family attended.
