= List of foreshore industrial sites on Sydney Harbour =

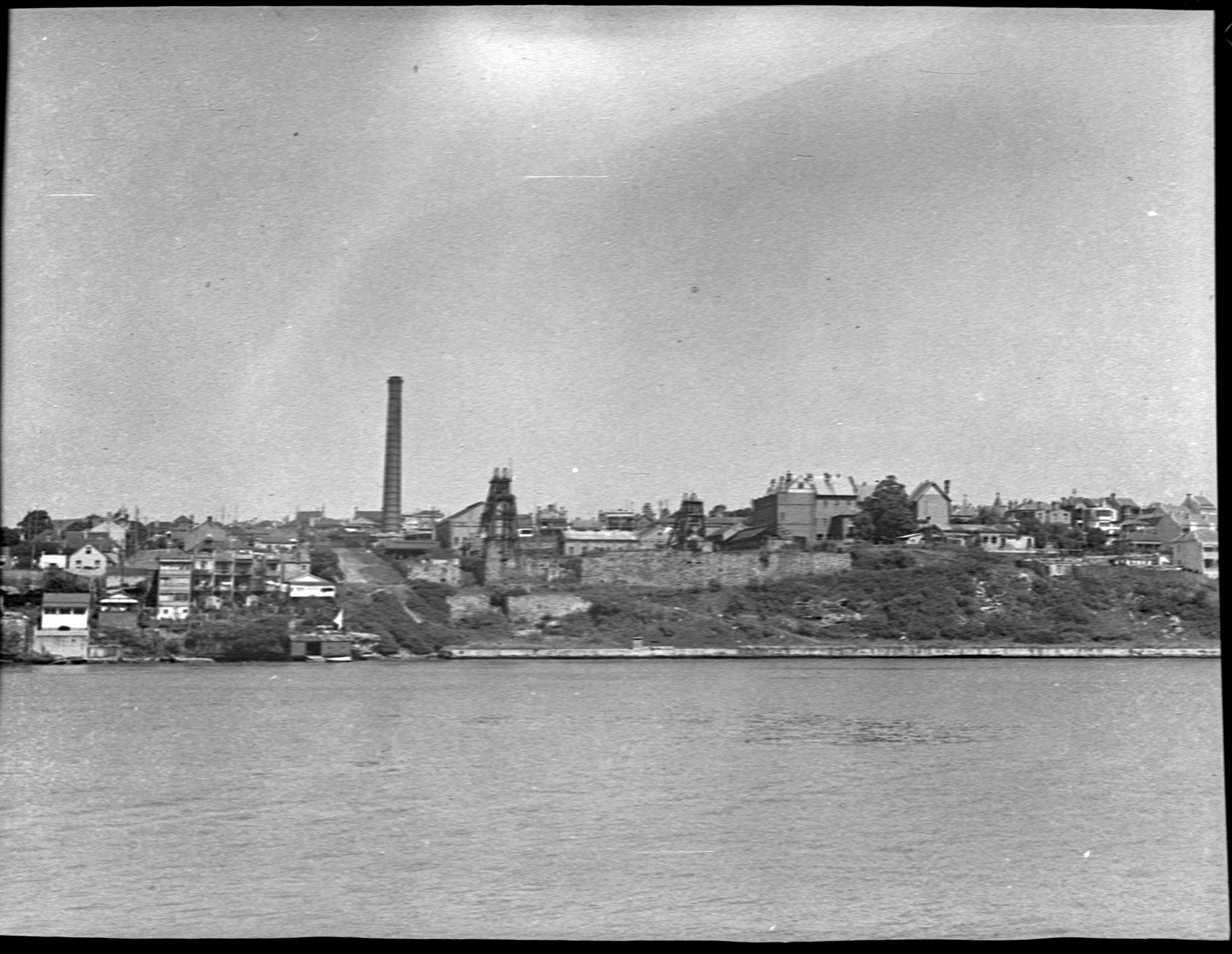
Balmain Colliery

This is a list of industrial sites on or adjacent to the foreshore of Port Jackson, including Sydney Harbour, North Harbour, Middle Harbour, Lane Cove River, Parramatta River, and the islands within those waterways. Sydney now has relatively few foreshore industrial sites compared with earlier times, and this list is mainly of historical interest.

This list may not include all existing and former industrial sites on or near the foreshore. It covers the period commencing from colonisation of Sydney in 1788.

The Parramatta River, although for the most part tidal, is defined as commencing at a line between Mann's Point, Greenwich and Long Nose Point, Birchgrove.

== Northern foreshore ==
Sites are shown in order of location on the northern foreshore, running generally east to west.

| Suburb/Locality | Company/Site | Industry/Function | Years of operation | Current land use / Replaced by |
|---|---|---|---|---|
| North Head | North Head Quarantine Station | Quarantine station for passengers arriving on ships with notifiable diseases. It had its own wharf for landing quarantined passengers from ships. | 1832—1984 | Heritage site with 'Q-Station' accommodation. |
| Manly / Little Manly Point | Manly Gas Co. | Gasworks and coal unloading wharf. | 1885—1964 | Gasworks buildings were demolished in 1971 but the site remained vacant for nearly 20 years, until its decontamination. It is now Little Manly Point Park |
| Middle Harbour / Bantry Bay | Bantry Bay Explosives Depot | Depot for the safe storage of explosives. | 1915—1974 | Heritage site since 1999. |
| Middle Harbour / Cammeray | Metropolitan Board of Water Supply and Sewerage | Folly Point Sewage Treatment Works | 1891—1927 | Primrose Park, with some remnants of the sewage works structures. |
| Clifton Gardens / Chowder Bay / Georges Heights | Military Forces | Submarine Mining Depot until 1922 and later Army Maritime School, also naval refuelling facility | 1889—1997 | Heritage site and hospitality venues. |
| Mosman | Government of New South Wales | Animal quarantine station (transferred from Shark Island) In 1917, a new quarantine station was opened at Abbotsford. | c1899—c.1916 | Taronga Zoo |
| Mosman / Mosman Bay | Archibald Mosman's whaling station | Whaling station and wharf. | 1831—1840s | Remaining building in Avenue Rd is The Barn Scout Hall now used by 1st Mosman Scouts. |
| Mosman / Mosman Bay | Harnett's Sandstone Quarry | Quarry and wharf | 1878—1889 | Mosman Rowing Club and houses and stone wharf remnants. A narrow reserve and flights of stairs follow the old alignment of an inclined cable tramway. |
| Kurraba Point | Thrupp's Quarry | Sandstone quarry. Before being quarried for stone blocks, Kurraba Point was used as a source of ballast for sailing ships. | 1860—1862 | Soap and oil factory (see below). Stone from the quarry was used to build the tower and buildings of Fort Denison |
| Kurraba Point | Patrick Hayes | Soap and oil factory | —c.1883 | Land sold in 1883 for ferry base (see below) |
| Kurraba Point | Port Jackson & Manly Steamship Company | Ferry base and engineering workshop. | c.1883—1964 | When the ferry company was acquired by the NSW Government in 1974, the land was included and it became Kurraba Point Reserve. |
| Neutral Bay | Benjamin Boyd | Woolstore of three storeys constructed of sandstone, and reservoir for wool washing, adjacent to Boyd's house 'Craignathan', on the foreshore at what is now Hayes St, Neutral Bay. | 1840s | The disused woolstore building was demolished, in 1884, but some remnants exist of the store and reservoir. During the 1920s, the house became a private hotel. 'Craignathan' remains the name on an apartment complex there. |
| Neutral Bay | Lars Halvorsen Sons | Boat building yard (relocated from Drummoyne in 1925) and, from 1937, a boat servicing facility after boat building was relocated to Kissing Point. | 1925—until after 1946 at least | |
| Neutral Bay | North Shore Gas Company | Gasworks and coal unloading wharf. | 1876—1937 | World War II torpedo factory. (See below). |
| Neutral Bay | Royal Australian Navy | Torpedo factory | 1942— c. 1945 | Naval workshops (See below) |
| Neutral Bay | Royal Australian Navy | Royal Australian Navy Torpedo Maintenance Establishment (RNTME). Naval workshops servicing Royal Navy submarines and destroyers. | 1946— 1967 | Submarine base and submarine school. (See below) |
| Neutral Bay | Royal Australian Navy | HMAS Platypus - submarine base, submarine school and torpedo workshop | 1967— 1999 | From 2005, redeveloped as 'Sub Base Platypus' by the Sydney Harbour Federation Trust. |
| Kirribilli | Robert Campbell | One of Australia's first shipyards was located at Wudyong Point on the eastern side of Kirribilli. | 1807—? | Since 1902, the site has been occupied by the Royal Sydney Yacht Squadron. |
| Kirribilli | Pastoral Finance Association | Wool warehouse, meat cold store and wharf. Its generators supplied electricity to customers on the north side of the harbour. Its capacity was 26,000 bales of wool and 60,000 sheep carcasses. There was a wharf of 20,000 sq. feet in area, with 40 feet of water depth, and a barge canal that ran 50 feet inside the building. It was adjacent to Admiralty House, extending to Beulah Street. | 1890—1921 | The seven-storey building was destroyed by fire in December 1921, and the land was sold off in 19 allotments, in 1925. Later redeveloped as blocks of apartments. |
| Kirribilli | Sydney Harbour Trust / Sydney Ferries Limited | Vehicular ferry wharf, located between Jeffrey Street and Admiralty House. | 1924—c.1932 | Used during construction of the Sydney Harbour Bridge and closed after its opening in 1932. |
| Milsons Point | Sydney Harbour Trust / Sydney Ferries Limited | Vehicular ferry wharf, located at the end of Alfred Street. | By 1892 —1924 | Closed, in 1924, to allow construction of the Sydney Harbour Bridge, with vehicle ferries relocated to Kirribilli. |
| Milsons Point | Dorman Long & Company | Workshops for construction of Sydney Harbour Bridge. | c. 1923—c.1932 | Luna Park since 1935. |
| Milsons Point | Sydney Ferries Limited | Ferry depot prior to completion of Sydney Harbour Bridge. | —c.1932 | |
| Milsons Point | Sydney Ferries Limited | Large ferry wharves at former tram terminus and train terminus before Harbour Bridge. Associated with the original Milson's Point station. | Until 1932 | Luna Park, and smaller ferry wharf reflecting reduced scale of ferry operations after 1932. |
| Lavender Bay | George Alderton / Alderton's Lime Works | 'Bee hive' style lime kilns, using shells harvested in Middle Harbour and shells carried by two ketches from Brisbane Water. | —c.1890 | The railway yard constructed for the original North Shore line (see below). A bottle-shaped brick and cement syphon tank still stood in the yard in 1908, and there may have been remnants of the kilns there as late as 1924. |
| Lavender Bay | Sydney Trains | Lavender Bay train storage yard, known as North Sydney Electric Car Sidings. | 1890— now | Originally part of the main North Shore line leading to the first Milson's Point station, it became a train storage yard, after the Sydney Harbour Bridge opened. |
| Lavender Bay | (Various) | Small-scale boat building and repair | 1860s—2005 | |
| McMahons Point | Sydney Ferries Limited | Large ferry wharves at the former tram terminus used before the Harbour Bridge. | Until 1932 | Smaller wharf reflecting reduced scale of ferry operations after 1932. |
| McMahons Point | Sydney Ferries Limited | Blue's Point Ferry Depot | Until 1932 | Foreshore park and on part the boat shed below. |
| McMahons Point | Griffin's boatshed | Boat shed with two slipways on Henry Lawson Avenue | | Structures will be demolished, adding to existing Henry Lawson Reserve. |
| Blues Point | Sydney Ferries Limited | Vehicular ferry loading point. | Until 1932 | The access points for the vehicular ferries still exist, at the end of Blues Point Road, atop the seawall east of Blues Point Tower. |
| McMahons Point / Berrys Bay | John W. Eaton Ltd (Timber Merchants) | Power house, two sawmills, engineers shop, joinery shop, blacksmiths shop and wharf and crane. | 1880— c.1980 | Sawmillers Reserve, public open space. |
| McMahons Point / Berrys Bay | Watty Ford's shipyard / Walter McFarlane Ford | Boatyard that made ferries and other vessels. Ford was also well-known as an owner and sailor of 18-footer skiffs. | 1870—1930 | Site reused by Stannards (see below) |
| McMahons Point / Berrys Bay | Stannards Marine / now Noakes & Rosman Cruises | Boatyard that made ferries and other vessels. The company had tugboat operations, and still does in some other Australian ports. | 1958—now | Modern boatyard and residential apartments, 'The Waterman', after c.1979. |
| Waverton / Berrys Bay | BP | Crude and refined oil terminal | 1922—1993 | Carradah Park - Public open space with industrial remnants |
| Waverton / Berrys Bay | Woodleys Shipyard | Shipbuilding and repair yard. This business relocated from Millers Point in 1906. | 1906—2012 | The buildings and infrastructure were largely intact in 2023, but the site had been cleared by the late February 2026. |
| Waverton / Berrys Bay | Quarantine Launch Depot | Depot, refuelling facilities and houses for the crew of vessels Pasteur and Jenner, which were used to ferry sick passengers from ships to the North Head Quarantine Station. | 1912—1988 | In 1988 the site was transferred to the Australian National Maritime Museum. |
| Waverton / Berrys Bay | Australian National Maritime Museum | Maintenance facility used by the museum to maintain its heritage fleet. | 1988—recent | Two houses on the site have been purchased by North Sydney Council, with rest of site under Transport for NSW control and affected by future Western Harbour Tunnel project. |
| Waverton / Balls Head Bay | Balls Head Coal Loader | Coal unloader, stockpile and ship-loader. | 1920—1993 | Public space with remnants, and interpretive signs. |
| Waverton / Balls Head Bay | Department of Public Works, NSW | Quarry for sandstone rock that was used to connect Garden Island to the mainland during the construction of the graving dock. | 1930s—1942 | Naval base (see below) sited below the artificial sheer cliff created by the quarrying. |
| Waverton / Balls Head Bay | Royal Australian Navy | Naval base, HMAS Waterhen | 1943—now | Remains in use. |
| Waverton / Balls Head Bay (the part of it previously known as Oyster Bay or Cove and Kerosene Bay) | Robey's Sugar Works | Sugar refinery. This company had financial problems and was bought by CSR in 1859. | c.1857—1859 | Kerosene Works (see below) |
| Waverton / Balls Head Bay (the part of it previously known as Oyster Bay or Cove and Kerosene Bay) | Australian Mineral Oil Co. | Shale oil refinery and handling of imported 'case oil' The first shale came from Stony Creek near 'West Maitland', (probably near modern-day Farley). Later shale seems to have come from Hartley Vale. | c.1865—c.1867 | It was this industry that gave the waterway its earlier name 'Kerosene Bay'. Site reused by Peruvian Oil Company (see below) |
| Waverton / Balls Head Bay (the part of it previously known as Oyster Bay or Cove and Kerosene Bay) | Peruvian Oil Company | The above works, known as the 'North Shore Kerosene Works', was used to process imported crude oil from Peru. | January 1868 to at least November 1868. | Buildings taken over by an explosive works (see below). |
| Waverton / Balls Head Bay (the part of it previously known as Oyster Bay or Cove and Kerosene Bay) | Neokratine Safety Explosives Co. | Works making 'Neokratine' brand explosive | 1889—1891 | North Shore Gas Company (see below) |
| Waverton / Balls Head Bay (the part of it previously known as Oyster Bay or Cove and Kerosene Bay) | North Shore Gas Company | Gasworks and wharf After coal gas production ceased, during the period 1971–1973, the artist Brett Whitely used the disused coal store building as a studio for creating large artworks. | 1917—1987 | Residential development 'Wondakiah', with some public open space. Some of the old gasworks buildings have been repurposed. |
| Waverton / Balls Head Bay (the part of it previously known as Oyster Bay or Cove and Kerosene Bay) | Millars | Timber yard and wharf | 1930s | Now a bushland reserve, Badangi Reserve. A history of the timber yard and wharf appears on signage there. |
| Greenwich / Gore Bay | Shell | Crude and refined oil terminal. | 1901—now | Now operated by Shell distributor Viva Energy. |
| Greenwich / Gore Bay | Patent Asphaltum Company of NSW | Refinery for bitumen, imported from Trinidad. | 1884—1908 | Greewich Timber Co. (see below). |
| Greenwich / Gore Bay | Greewich Timber Co. | Timber yard. | 1908—1911 | Land sold to John Fell & Co. in 1911 (see below). |
| Greenwich / Gore Bay | John Fell & Co / later Shell | Lubricating oil refinery | 1911—at least 1937 | Bought in 1927 by Shell, owners of the adjoining land. It continued to operate as a refinery, under Shell ownership, at least as late as 1937. |
| Greenwich / Gore Bay | John Fell & Co. / later Shell | Four-storey reinforced concrete building used as a bulk store for oil products. | 1921—at least 1937 | Bought in 1927 by Shell, owners of the adjoining land. The building was still standing in 1935, but is now gone. |
| Greenwich / Manns Point | Burns Philp | Wharf and bond store for copha and salt | —c.1965 | Greenwich Sailing Club |
| Greenwich | Henry Ferris (Messrs. Ferris & James) / Rosemorrin Smelting Works | Coke ovens and wharf used for the copper smelter located on the opposite side of the river, at Onions Point, Woolwich. | c.1847—c. 1849 | |
| Longueville / Woodford Bay | Rupert Kirk | Soap and candle factory, on the south-west corner of Woodford Bay | 1831·1842 | Residential housing |
| Riverview / Burns Bay | Radke, from 1941 J.C.Ludowici | Tannery on the left bank of Tannery Creek. | 1880— | Residential housing. |
| Lane Cove / Burns Bay | A. Radke & J.C Ludowici | Tanneries on the right bank of Tannery Creek. Prior to 1858 their tannery was at Balmain. | 1858— | Residential housing and public open space. |
| Lane Cove / Burns Bay | Mangrovite Belting | Tannery and manufacturer of leather drive belts, on the right bank of Tannery Creek, originally owned by Charles Ludowici (son of J.C. Ludowici, and later a publicly listed company (delisted 1993). | 1913— | Light industrial area, located east of the roundabout on Waterview Drive. |
| Lane Cove / Burns Bay | Australian Wood Pipe Company | Factory for manufacturing wooden pipes, located on the western side of Burns Bay. | 1914— | Mangrovite Oval, public open space |
| Lane Cove River / Lane Cove | Cumberland Paper Board Mill | Paper and cardboard mill, located south of Stringybark Creek, with a dam on the creek. | 1912—1928 | The plant burned in a fire in 1928 and the site was reused to manufacture chemicals (see below). The dam on Stringybark Creek is a remnant of the paper mill. |
| Lane Cove River / Lane Cove | Robert Corbett and Sons, later CSR Chemicals | Chemical manufacturing plant | 1928— | S.C.Johnson and others |
| Lane Cove River / Lane Cove | S.C.Johnson | Household cleaning products | —now | Still operating. The area south of S.C.Johnson is a light industrial area |
| Lane Cove River / Lane Cove | John Sugden Berry | Boiling down works | —c.1894 | ‘Chicago Starch Mill’ |
| Lane Cove River / Lane Cove | ‘Chicago Starch Mill’, later Clifford Love and Co. and later various others, finally Ingredion | Corn mill and starch factory, on left bank of the river, north of the confluence with Stringybark Creek, located near where Epping Road crosses the Lane Cove River. | 1894—2020 | Closed on 31 January 2020, when Ingredion ceased milling (45,000 tonnes of maize per-annum) and switched to imports. Expected to be rezoned and redeveloped as apartments. |
| Lane Cove River / West Lindfield | Jenkins family, and others | Orchards and wharves, on the upper part of the river below the former tidal limit, which were accessible by boat before the construction of the Lane Cove River weir in the 1930s | c.1842—1937 | Lane Cove National Park, with some remnant buildings. |
| Lane Cove River / West Lindfield | Cook's Wharf | River wharf, which once stood at the river end (near what would later be the Schwartz Homestead) of an early road in the district (now Bradfield Rd), in what is now Lane Cove National Park. | c.1830s | Part of Lane Cove National Park.This section of the river is no longer tidal, being impounded by a weir. |
| Lane Cove River / West Killara | Fidden's Wharf | River wharf, which once stood at the river end of an early road in the district (now Fiddens Wharf Rd), in what is now Lane Cove National Park. | c.1805 | This section of the river is no longer tidal, being impounded by a weir. |
| Lane Cove River / West Killara | Government sawmill | There was a government-run sawmill operated by convict labour, nearby the site of the wharf. | c.1805—c.1819 | |
| Lane Cove River (right-bank) / Hunters Hill | Ferry services on the Lane Cove River / Fig Tree Depot | Ferry depot located on the shoreline between the Fig Tree Bridge and Fig Tree House. The site was used replenish coal bunkers of steam ferries and was also the site of Fig Tree ferry wharf. | c.1871—? | The seawall of the depot is still apparent and the adjacent Fig Tree House still stands. |
| Woolwich / Onions Point (then known as 'Rosemorrin') | Henry Ferris (Messrs. Ferris & James) / Rosemorrin Smelting Works | Copper smelter managed by Richard Cocks. It had four blast furnaces, and two wharves. Blast was provided by an 8 horsepower steam engine and the plant had a capacity of 50 tons of ore per week. Coal, wood, and coke was loaded at a wharf on the opposite side of the Lane Cove River. | c.1847— c. 1849 | |
| Woolwich | Atlas Engineering Company | Workshops | 1884—1898 | Taken over by Mort's Dock in 1898. |
| Woolwich | Mort's Woolwich Dock | Dry-dock | 1901—1958 | Army water transport, from 1963 until 1997, now public space with remnants. |
| Woolwich | Sydney Smelting Co. | Tin smelter and wharf. | 1892—1967 | Kellys Bush Park, tin smelting operation was relocated to Alexandria |
| Hunters Hill | (Unknown) | Coal tar refinery producing Carbolic Acid. | 1900-1911 | Site reused by Radium Hill (see below) |
| Hunters Hill | Radium Hill | Radium and uranium refinery | 1911—1915 | Residential housing (7-11 Nelson Parade), later purchased by the N.S.W. Government and demolished, due to presence of radioactive waste. The area was still being decontaminated in 2021. |
| Hunters Hill | Mobil Oil | Oil import terminal. | 1924—1988 | Residential housing (Pulpit Point) |
| Putney / Kissing Point | James Squire and his descendants | Brewery and 'Malt Shovel Tavern' | c.1792—c.1834 | Part of the site became the Kidman and Mayoh shipyard and later the Halvorsen boatyard. |
| Putney / Kissing Point | Kidman & Mayoh | Shipyard | c.1917— 1922 | Site later used by Lars Halvorsen Sons. |
| Putney / Kissing Point | Slazenger Shipyard | Wartime facility, with operations of sporting goods manufacturer converted to wooden vessel building. | 1943— c.1946 | |
| Putney / Kissing Point | Lars Halvorsen Sons | Boat building facility | c1937—c.1980 | Building still standing, now used as Recycled Building Materials Centre. |
| Putney / Kissing Point | Bill Fisher | Boat builder. | Until 1992 | |
| Meadowbank | Meadowbank Manufacturing Company | Agricultural machinery and railway and tramway rolling stock maker. | 1890—1930 | Meadowbank TAFE, and there is a memorial to works manager, Thiomas White, on the site. TAFE site is being redeveloped as an education precinct with TAFE, primary school and high school. |
| Meadowbank | Hoover | Domestic appliance factory | 1953—2001 | Residential housing. |
| Melrose Park (Wharf Road) | Pfizer Australia | Pharmaceutical company. | 1959—2015 | Historically, the part of Melrose Park that lies within the City of Parramatta has been an industrial suburb, but redevelopment of this area, for residential apartment blocks, is well under way. |
| Melrose Park (Wharf Road) | GlaxoSmithKline | Pharmaceutical company. | —c.2020 | (as above) |
| Melrose Park (Wharf Road) | Eli Lilly | Pharmaceutical company. | —2015 | (as above) |
| Melrose Park (Wharf Road) | Aeroplane Jelly | Factory making the famous Australian brand of jelly. | 1973—2006 | (as above) Factory operations moved to Clayton, Victoria. |
| Melrose Park (Wharf Road) | Big Sister Foods | Manufacturer of fruit cakes and other baked goods. The company failed in 2014, although its brand remains in use by others.. | 1945 or later—2014 | (as above) |

== Southern foreshore ==
Sites are shown in order of location, generally running generally east to west.

| Suburb/Locality | Company/Site | Industry/Function | Years of operation | Current land use / Replaced by |
|---|---|---|---|---|
| Watsons Bay | Transport for NSW | 1907—1959, Lifeboat station; 1959–2015, Pilot boat station | 1907—2015 | Building and jetty leased to Boating Industry Association and repurposed as a boating safety school. |
| Watsons Bay | Boating Industry Association | The Pilot Station – Boating Safety Education Centre | 2015—now | Still operating |
| Rose Bay | Rose Bay Water Airport | Seaplane landing space | 1938—now | Still operating for light seaplanes only. |
| Rose Bay | Qantas / Ansett | Flying boat base and hangars. | 1938—1974 | |
| Rushcutters Bay | Hardy's Rubber Works (or Hardie's?) | Rubber factory | c.1932 | |
| Rushcutters Bay | Rushcutters Bay Tram Depot | Public transport (cable trams then electric trams, and trolleybuses) When originally constructed for cable trams, it was also the site of the winding house that propelled the cable. | 1898—1960 | Rushcutters Bay Hotel |
| Potts Point / Garden Island | Royal Australian Navy | Naval dockyard and base. This base is known officially as Fleet Base East. | 1866—now | Still operating. |
| Potts Point / Garden Island | Royal Australian Navy | Captain Cook Graving Dock | 1945—now | Still operating |
| Woolloomooloo | Finger Wharf | Shipping wharf | 1913—c.1980 | Repurposed as a hotel and residential. |
| Woolloomooloo | Sydney Suburban Hydraulic Power Company | Hydraulic power pumping sub-station, located on Cowper Wharf Road. | c.1920s | |
| Woolloomooloo | Fish Market | Public and wholesale fish market | 1871—c.1945 | Astor apartments (block bounded by Bourke, Plunkett, Forbes and Wilson Sts) |
| Woolloomooloo | Wharves | Shipping wharves on western shore. | | Apartments |
| Bennelong Point | Quarry | Quarry used to obtain sandstone for early government buildings and seawalls. | c.1788—c.1848 | 'Tarpeian Way', artificial cliff-face and Man o' War steps. |
| Bennelong Point | Lime Kilns | Lime Kilns once existed on the eastern side of Fort Macquarie, which burnt oyster and other shells to make lime. | | |
| Bennelong Point | Fort Macquarie | Military fort that replaced earlier fortifications dating back to 1788. | 1817—1901 | Fort Macquarie Tram Depot |
| Bennelong Point | Fort Macquarie Tram Depot | Public transport (electric trams) | 1902—1955 | Sydney Opera House |
| Bennelong Point | P&O Wharf | Passenger ship terminal, which stood to the west of the Fort Macquarie Tram Depot. It was already disused by 1928, with P & O ships berthing at Woolloomooloo Bay in that year, but the structure was still there c.1945. | | By c.1945 it was already known as the 'old P & O Wharf'. Now a part of area occupied by Sydney Opera House |
| Bennelong Point | Sydney Harbour Trust | Vehicular ferry wharf, located at Fort Macquarie, for vehicle ferries to Milsons Point until 1924 and, after 1924, Kirribilli. | —1932 | Closed after opening of the Sydney Harbour Bridge. |
| Circular Quay (East) / Sydney Cove | Warehouses | Wool-stores and auction houses | c.1840s | Now the site of the Bennelong Apartments buildings, colloquially known as ‘The Toaster’. |
| Circular Quay / Sydney Cove | Warehouse (Mort's later Farmers & Graziers) | Wool-stores and auction house | c.1860—1960 | Now the site of the AMP Building. |
| Circular Quay / Sydney Cove | Warehouses (various) | Smaller wool stores and warehouses. | c.1860—now | Although long since repurposed, some of these smaller buildings survive, in the laneways behind the Customs House, notably Hinchcliff House in Young Street. |
| Circular Quay / Sydney Cove | Ferry Wharves | Public transport (Ferries) | —now | Newer ferry wharves |
| The Rocks / Circular Quay (West) / Sydney Cove | Overseas Passenger Terminal | Passenger terminal and wharf for ocean liners and cruise ships. | 1958—now | Still in use. Major modifications made in 1988. |
| The Rocks / Circular Quay (West) / Sydney Cove | Government Dockyard | Dockyard | 1797—1859 | Open space near Cadman's Cottage and part of Museum of Contemporary Art site. Cadman's Cottage is the former coxswains' barracks. |
| The Rocks / Circular Quay (West) / Sydney Cove | Commisariat Store & King's / Queen's Wharf (originally known as 'Hospital Wharf') | Government warehouse, with public wharf known as King's Wharf (after 1837, Queen's Wharf) in front. | Warehouse: 1810—1939 Wharf: 1802—? | The Maritime Services Board Building now occupied by Museum of Contemporary Art |
| The Rocks / Circular Quay (West) / Sydney Cove | Metcalfe Bond Stores | Warehouse and bond store, built 1912–1916. | c1912—? | Building repurposed as offices, restaurants, and retail arcade. |
| The Rocks / Circular Quay (West) / Sydney Cove | New South Wales Department of Public Works / George Street Electric Light Power Station | Intended to supply the Rocks and Millers Point area with direct-current electricity, and replace two small power stations operated by Public Works, this power station was inadequately sized and was an early victim of the debate over the merits of alternating current and direct current. No machinery was ever installed in it, and the building was left in a roofless state. No longer needed, after Pyrmont Power Station opened in 1904. | 1900—1908 | The tall brick chimney (a landmark of the Rocks) is a relic of the original power station, but was never used. The single-storey building was converted, by adding more floors in 1908, to house the Geological & Mining Museum (since closed), by Government Architect, Walter Liberty Vernon. |
| Dawes Point | Sydney Ferries Limited / Sydney Harbour Trust | Horse ferry dock and later vehicular ferry wharf on the Sydney Cove side of Dawes Point. Redundant after the opening of Sydney Harbour Bridge and subsequently closed, | —1932 | Open space with the remnants of the ferry site evident in the arrangement of the seawall. |
| Walsh Bay | Wharves | Shipping wharves | | Repurposed wharves |
| Millers Point | John Leighton's flour mills | Wind-powered flour mills. John Leighton's nickname 'Jack the Miller' was applied to the area, as 'Jack the Miller's Point', later Millers Point. | c.1814— c.1842 | Houses. |
| Millers Point | Windmill Street Quarry | Sandstone quarry. | c.1790— c.1830 | Buildings in Windmill Street, around where it dips in level. |
| Millers Point / Darling Harbour / Barangaroo | Munn's Slipway | Boatyard and slipway. | 1820s | Cuthbert's Shipyard. Some stone flagging from Munn's Slipway has been preserved in Nawi Cove. |
| Millers Point / Darling Harbour / Barangaroo | John Cuthbert / Cuthbert's Shipyard | Shipyard for wooden sailing vessels and steamers. The business began at 'Milne's Wharf' (also on Darling Harbour), in 1853, but was transferred to the site at Miller's Point in 1861. The first naval vessel built in Australia, H.M.S. Spitfire, was made there. | 1861— 1873 | Replaced by warehouses. Now Nawi Cove in the Barangaroo redevelopment. |
| Millers Point / Darling Harbour / Barangaroo | Australian Gas Light | Gasworks, the first in Australia. | 1841—1921 | Now occupied by part of the Barangaroo redevelopment. One building of the gasworks, later Building 1 of the MSB Stores Complex, remains standing. |
| Sydney City / Cockle Bay | Various flour mills (Sussex Street) | Steam flour mills | 1830s | |
| Sydney City / Bathurst Street | Gillespie Bros Flour Mill | Flour mill | —1921 | Moved to Pyrmont in 1921. |
| Sydney City / Darling Harbour | Wharves | Coastal shipping wharves (general cargo) | | Redeveloped as mixed use. |
| Sydney / Darling Harbour | Government Freezing Works | Freezing works including for export. | c. 1899 | |
| Sydney / Darling Harbour (former Barker Street) | Wearne's Flour Mill | Flour mill destroyed by fire in 1866. It stood near the foot of Bathurst St, in the former Barker St. the business relocated to Goulburn Street. The Wearne family were associated with other mills in N.S.W. | —1866 | |
| Sydney / Darling Harbour (former Barker Street) | P. N. Russell and Company | Ironworks and foundry. Steam-engines, boilers, rolling stock and mining equipment. | 1855—1875 | Closed down after protracted industrial disputes. C&G Hoskins started as a result of P & N Russell shutdown. |
| Ultimo / Darling Harbour | Sydney Suburban Hydraulic Power Company / Hydraulic Pumping Station No.1 | Pumphouse for hydraulic power to operate lifts, hoists, cranes, bank doors and wool dumping presses. The company was established in 1889, and the pump station commenced operating in 1891. (The original water source was the company's water supply dam, located at what is now Zetland, around the north-west corner of South Dowling St. and O’Dea Ave. Water was pumped through 2.5 mile (4 km) of cast iron mains to the pump-house.) | 1889—1975 | Building still standing. From 1988, it was used as a micro-brewery and bar and, subsequently, as a bar and restaurant. Part of the company became Elevators Pty Ltd, in 1955, and is now a part of Kone. |
| Ultimo / Darling Harbour | Ultimo Power Station | Electricity for tram network. | 1899—1963 | Powerhouse Museum |
| Pyrmont / Darling Harbour (see also Darling Island) | Darling Harbour Yard | Rail goods yard and wharves. | 1856— 1993 | Darling Harbour redevelopment |
| Pyrmont / Darling Harbour (see also Darling Island) | Goldsbrough Mort & Co. | Wool store. | —1980s | The original building was repurposed, in 1995, with four new floors added, as 'the Goldsbrough' apartment building. |
| Pyrmont / Darling Harbour (see also Darling Island) | Farmers and Graziers | Wool store. | | The original building was repurposed, as an apartment building by Meriton in 1998. |
| Pyrmont / Darling Harbour (see also Darling Island) | Pyrmont coal wharves | Railway coal wharves (both loading and unloading of coal) | c.1870s—c1930s | Australian National Maritime Museum |
| Pyrmont / Darling Harbour (see also Darling Island) | David Drake | Shipyard at the foreshore end of Murray Street. The business relocated first to Jones Bay in 1881 and then to Bald Rock, Balmain in 1889. | 1875—1881 | |
| Pyrmont / Darling Harbour (see also Darling Island) | Pyrmont Power Station | Electricity supply. It was operated first by the City Council, then by Sydney County Council, from 1935, and last by Electricity Commission of New South Wales, from 1952. | 1904—1983 | Star Casino |
| Pyrmont / Darling Harbour (see also Darling Island) | Grain store | Grain stores for wharves | c. 1903 | |
| Pyrmont / Darling Harbour (see also Darling Island) | Goodlet and Smith / Victoria Steam Saw and Joinery Mills | Sawmill and joinery works, on Murray Street and the western foreshore of Darling Harbour. Relocated to a site adjacent to the CSR sugar refinery in 1885. | 1872—1885 | |
| Pyrmont | Pyrmont Tin Smelting Company | Tin Smelter and jetty. | 1874— (at least) 1918 | Pyrmont Bay Park |
| Pyrmont | Henry Vale & Company | Manufacturer of marine engines and locomotives. The factory was on a former street, known as Alma Street, that no longer exists. | c.1875—1884 | The works relocated to Auburn in 1884, eventually its site was occupied by part of the flour mill (see below) |
| Pyrmont | Gillespie Bros Flour Mill (Union Street) | Flour mill and grain silos on Union St and Edward st. (An earlier mill stood at the base of Bathurst St on (former) Barker St until 1921.) | 1921—1992 | The Pyrmont mill was demolished in 1992 and replaced with a supermarket, office buildings and a part of the Star Casino's site. |
| Pyrmont | The Waterside Cold Stores (Jones Bay) | Cold store. | c.1932—c.1988 | |
| Pyrmont | Goodlet & Smith (Jones Bay) | Timber wharf, sawmill and timber yard. This timber business began in 1872, in nearby Murray Street on the western side of Darling Harbour, and relocated to its new site in 1885. The main building of five storeys, housed a large engine driving the machinery throughout the building. The site closed when the lease on the land expired in 1927. (Goodlet & Smith also made bricks and roof tiles, at other places in Sydney. The Goodlet family were known as philanthropists.) | 1885—1927 | |
| Pyrmont | Thomas Chowne (Jones Bay) | Shipyard that built thirteen vessels including two early harbour ferries. | c.1840—c.1860 | Sugar refinery (see below) |
| Pyrmont | Colonial Sugar Refinery (Jones Bay) | Sugar refinery and wharves. To prepare for construction of the sugar refinery, the site was first quarried for sandstone, until its level was just above high-tide level. The site had two grab-unloader cranes for unloading raw sugar and other bulk materials from the 1950s. | 1875— 1993 | Residential housing (‘Jackson's Landing’) |
| Pyrmont | David Drake | Shipyard at Jones Bay. The business relocated from near Murray Street in 1881 and then relocated to Bald Rock, Balmain, in 1889. | 1881—1889 | |
| Pyrmont | Saunder's Quarries | Quarries for building stone (sandstone). The quarries had colloquial names, 'Paradise', 'Half Way', 'Purgatory', and 'Hell.' The quarries were the main source of the highly regarded 'yellowblock' freestone. Many notable Sydney sandstone buildings used stone from the quarries at Pyrmont. | 1840s—1940s | Various uses. The Wentworth Park light rail stop is located inside the site of the former 'Half Way' quarry. The Farmers & Graziers building is on the site of the 'Purgatory' quarry. |
| Pyrmont | City Iron Works | Iron works and rolling mills. It was also known as 'Brown's Ironworks', after its owner, and was located nearby the Glebe Island Bridge. | 1865—1938 | Relocated to Alexandria in 1938. Its site became part of the CSR site and is now part of Waterfront Park, Pyrmont. |
| Blackwattle Bay | Sydney City Council / Municipal incinerator | The municipal incinerator was the largest of the six reverberatory furnace incinerators, in Sydney, built by Reverberatory Incinerator and Engineering Co. Pty Ltd, in buildings designed by architect Walter Burley Griffin. It stood at what is now the corner of Bank St and Quarry Master Drive, overlooking Blackwattle Bay. The road entrance was from Saunders St. The area had been quarried for sandstone previously. | c.1936—1971 | The practice of incinerating garbage became unacceptable, due to air pollution limits, and the incinerator closed. The building was left to decay, before being demolished in 1992. The site was reused to build a Meriton apartment block. |
| Blackwattle Bay | State Brickworks | Wharf and brick depot for bricks made at the brickworks, at Homebush Bay, and brought by water from there. | c.1936 | |
| Blackwattle Bay | Heidelberg Materials Australia | Concrete batching plant. (Replaced plant closed at new fish market site.) | 2021—now | |
| Blackwattle Bay | Allen Taylor & Company, Sexton & Binns, and others | Timber yards and wharves. | c.1908 | Sydney Fish Markets |
| Blackwattle Bay | Shell Company of Australia | Kerosene and Mineral turpentine unloading wharf and storage tanks | | Sydney Fish Markets |
| Blackwattle Bay | Sydney Fish Market | Wholesale and retail fish market. | 1966—now | Still operating (2021) but planned to be relocated to the head of the bay. |
| Blackwattle Bay | Jones Brothers, Wharf 21 | Coal unloader and coal depot. It had a large gantry crane and a wooden coal bunker structure | 1926—c.1988 | Derelict site for many years. Demolished as a part of the relocation of Sydney Fish Market, in 2021 |
| Blackwattle Bay | RW Miller | Coal unloader and coal depot | | |
| Blackwattle Bay | Howard Smith, Wharf 25 | Coal unloader and coal depot | c.1922 | Site later cleared and used as mooring area by RW.Miller and later for 'Stone Fleet', as below. |
| Blackwattle Bay | Pioneer Concrete, later Hanson Australia | Wharf and bunkers for unloading and distribution of construction aggregate from the ships known colloquially as the 'Stone Fleet'. | Until 2011 | Became a concrete batching plant, as below. |
| Blackwattle Bay | Hanson Australia | Concrete batching plant. | Until c2020 | Demolished for new Fish Market development in 2021. (Replaced by facility adjacent to the old Fish Market on the other side of Blackwattle Bay.) |
| Blackwattle Bay | New Sydney Fish Market (Construction site) | New Sydney Fish Market (under construction) | 2021—now | The new market and its retail outlets are due to open in (late) 2025. |
| Blackwattle Bay / Wentworth Park | Imperial Wool Purchase Scheme | Wool storage sheds in Wentworth Park, capacity 35,000 bales | c1916—1923 | Parkland (Wentworth Park) |
| Blackwattle Bay / Glebe | Kauri Timber Company | Timber unloading wharf, next wharf to the west of Howard Smith's coal wharf. Imported timbers included kauri pine, 'Oregon', and Baltic pine. Timber yard and factory. | 1883—1909 | Sold to George Hudson and Son in 1909. |
| Blackwattle Bay / Glebe | George Hudson & Son Ltd. | Timber yard, factory and wharf. Scene of a huge fire in 1928 and a famous industrial dispute in 1929. It was still expanding its area in 1950. | 1909— 1950s, at least | From 1979, Glebe High School, now Sydney Secondary College Blackwattle Bay Campus, and foreshore parkland. |
| Blackwattle Bay / Glebe | G.E. Crane and Sons / Sydney Lead Works | Leadworks with 190 foot high shot tower In 1906, the site was also rolling lead sheet and making lead pipes. | 1893—1930 | Partially demolished c.1950 (shot tower). |
| Blackwattle Bay / Glebe | Municipality of The Glebe / Municipal Incinerator | The municipal incinerator building was designed by architect Walter Burley Griffin. Previously the site was a depot, where garbage was loaded onto barges, taken out to sea and dumped offshore. Eventually, the practice of incinerating garbage became unacceptable and the incinerator closed. | 1933 (or 1936)—1949 | Much of the building has survived; the furnace and flue were demolished in 1952. It is one of six surviving in Australia, and one of two in Sydney. |
| Blackwattle Bay / Glebe | Vanderfield and Reid | Large timber yard on waterfront land leased from the Maritime Services Board. | Until c.1970 | Now part of Blackwattle Bay Park. The restored house Bellevue (now a cafe) was once part of Vanderfield & Reid's timber yard. |
| Glebe Point | Stride's Yard | Breaking yard located on the foreshore and Leichhardt St, Glebe, founded by Sylvester 'Jim' Stride and operated as a family business. In 1937, the business bought more land and expanded the site. The harbour ferries Curl Curl and Dee Why were scrapped there, as was the 'sixty-miler' SS Bellambi. The size of ship that could be broken up there was limited by the opening width of the Glebe Island Bridge. | c.1919—1985 | The yard's crane was conserved as a public artwork, in 2010, and still stands in the portion of the site that is now part of Blackwattle Bay Park. |
| Glebe Point | Harbour Lighterage Limited | This company split from the remnants of Sydney Ferries Limited in 1951. It had a base on Rozelle Bay, from where it operated a fleet of small tugs and lighters. The fleet was sold at auction in 1990. | —1990 | Most of its site is covered by the Bridgewater apartments, built in 1996, except for a small strip of public land along the waterfront. A winch, from its former slipway, and its (now shortened) wharf remain at its former site. The wharf is privately owned. |
| Glebe Point | Streetley Industries, National Plywood, Sydney Sawmilling, and Standen Brothers. | Land owned by the Maritime Services Board was leased for use as timber yards. | Until c.1970 | Now public open space; Bicentennial Park (Glebe) and Federal Park were added to the existing Jubilee Park (Glebe) to create a large area of parkland. |
| Glebe Point | Independent Oil Industries Limited / Purr Pull Oil Industries Limited | 'Purr Pull' petrol import, storage and distribution facility, and from around 1957 a chemical manufacture and blending facility, located on waterfront land at 27-45 Federal Road, Glebe. Its abandoned site was still there in 1969. | 1932 until at least 1957 | Site now part of Federal Park, |
| Rozelle Bay | Rozelle Tram Depot | Public transport (Electric Trams) | 1904—1958 | Repurposed as a retail complex, 'Tramsheds' in 2016. |
| Rozelle Bay | Five yards on Rozelle Bay All there in 1939 | Timber yards | | |
| Rozelle Bay/ Annandale | Beale Piano (possibly one of the above yards) | Timber wharf for nearby piano factory | c.1902—c. 1975 | |
| Rozelle / White Bay | White Bay Power Station | Coal-fuelled electrical power station, operated by New South Wales Government Railways, from 1933, by NSW Department of Railways, and from 1953 by Electricity Commission of New South Wales. | 1913—1983 | Stood unused, until around 2021, when a remediation began. Reopened as a venue for community and cultural activities in 2024, |
| Rozelle / White Bay | Balmain Coal Loader | Coal ship-loader mainly used for coal brought to the site by rail. | 1935—1991 | Yet to be redeveloped. Part of the Bays Precinct, it will be site of The Bays metro station, on the Sydney Metro West, due to open in 2032. |
| Balmain / White Bay | Lever Brothers | Soap and detergent factory, known colloquially as 'The Sunlight Factory.' | 1895—1988 | Residential housing ('Watervale', 'Dockside' and 'Somerset Mews' apartments), with some remnant buildings. |
| Balmain / White Bay | David Drake Limited | Shipyard in the area of Balmain known as 'Bald Rock'. | 1889—1934 | |
| Balmain / White Bay | Poole & Steel Limited | Shipyard at the foreshore end of Stephen Street. During the Second World War, the yard constructed seven Bathurst-class corvettes and one tugboat for the Royal Australian Navy. | c. 1902— c. 1961 | The site was taken over by Swift's Chemicals, by 1967. |
| Balmain / White Bay | John Booth | Steam-operated sawmill and timber yard, located on the foreshore east of Booth Street. It provided timber for shipbuilding and housing. Destroyed by fire in 1874, it was rebuilt in 1875–76. | 1854—1902 | The site was later used as wharves. Booth Street is named after John Booth. |
| Balmain / White Bay | White Bay Cruise Terminal | Terminal for cruise liners. Supplements Overseas Passenger Terminal but can only accept liners that can fit under Sydney Harbour Bridge. | 2013—now | Still operating. |
| Balmain / Cameron Cove / Johnstone Bay | Anderson's Jubilee Floating Dry Dock | Ship repair floating dry-dock. It was originally known as the 'Victoria Jubilee' but subsequently just known as the 'Jubilee' floating dry dock. It was designed by its owner James Anderson. The floating dock was working, until at least 1902, and possibly later. The business relocated to Long Nose Point Birchgrove, as Jubllee Engineering Company, in the 1930s. | 1887—1930s | MSB depot (see below), some parkland and open water. The nearby street Jubilee Place, is named after the Jubilee dry-dock. |
| Balmain / Cameron Cove / Johnstone Bay | Maritime Services Board | Depot | 1930s—c.2004 | Water Police (see below) |
| Balmain / Cameron Cove / Johnstone Bay | NSW Police Marine Area Command, also known as the 'Water Police' | Police boat depot and wharf. The Water Police date from 1789 and earlier has been located at Watson's Bay, Garden Island, Goat Island and Cockatoo Island. | 2004—now | Still operating |
| Balmain / Cameron Cove / Johnstone Bay | Morrison & Sinclair | Shipyard that constructed ferries, island trading vessels, pontoons, lighters, and yachts. It moved to Longnose Point in 1923. | 1890s—1923 | |
| Balmain East / Peacock Point | Fenwick & Co Boat Store | Shipwrights yard, operated first by John Bell, and the Fenwick family after 1883. | c.1840—c.1994 | Heritage-listed building (2-8 Weston Street) and also open space that is now part of Iloura Reserve. |
| Balmain East / Peacock Point | John Graham / Graham's Dock | Small floating dock that was moored near the end of Darling Street, where there was also a shipyard. | c.1882—c.1887 at least | |
| Balmain East / Peacock Point | Peverley | Wharf and shipbuilding yard created by cutting away solid rock. It was put up for a mortgagee sale twice; once in 1869 and again in 1873. | | Yard taken over by Henry Beattie (see below), possibly after a mortgagee sale in 1873. |
| Balmain East / Peacock Point | Henry Beattie | Beattie's shipyard was located between Darling Street and Peacock Point. | c.1873— | Peacock Point Reserve |
| Balmain East / Waterview Bay | Waterview Wharf Workshops | Maritime industrial site. Formerly operated by Adelaide Steamship Company. | c.1900—now | Still operating |
| Balmain / Waterview Bay | Svitzer Australia, formerly Adelaide Steamship. | Tug boat depot and wharf; marine services. | —now | Still operating |
| Balmain / Waterview Bay | Colgate-Palmolive | Soap, toothpaste, and shampoo factory | 1922—1994 | Remaining building at 22-23 Colgate Ave, Balmain Site now housing. |
| Balmain / Waterview Bay | Sydney Slipway and Engineering Company | Slipway and engineering workshop. It was a wholly owned subsidiary of the Adelaide Steamship Company. The company entered voluntary liquidation in October 2003. | c.1959 and still there in 1972 | |
| Balmain / Waterview Bay | Balmain Shipyard | Public Transport (Ferries) | 1850s—now | Operated by Transdev Sydney Ferries |
| Balmain / Waterview Bay | Captain T. S. Rowntree | Patent slip. Rowntree was a partner, with T. S. Mort, in the subsequent dry-dock on the site, from the start of its construction in 1854 to around 1860. | c. 1852—1854 | Mort's Waterview Dock (see below) Rowntree St, Birchgrove is named after Captain Thomas Rowntree. |
| Balmain / Waterview Bay | Mort's Waterview Dock / 'Mort's Dock & Engineering Works' | Ship repair dock and some shipbuilding. By 1897, on the site of 18 acres, it employed around 1000 men, and it included a dry dock, two 'patent slips' and a smaller slip (slipways), engineering workshops (including a boiler shop, machining shop, erecting shop, and joinery shop), an iron foundry, and a sawmill, As well as serving the dockyard, the foundry made products such as cast-iron baths and building columns. The works also made mining and other machinery, and it fabricated parts for bridges. | 1855—1959 | The company went into liquidation in 1959. Part of the site was used as the ANL terminal (see below). Container storage site from 1963 to 1975, then residential housing and parkland. |
| Birchgrove / Mort Bay | Australian National Line | Terminal and wharf for MS Empress of Australia on Sydney-Hobart / Bell Bay / Devonport route. | 1965—1972 | Terminal was in Yeend Street |
| Birchgrove / Mort Bay | Thomas. S. Rowntree & Company | Floating dock in Mort's Bay. | c.1888 | Open water, |
| Birchgrove / Ballast Point | Texaco, later Caltex | Fuel depot, manufacturing and packaging facility. | 1928—c.1990 | Ballast Point Park (urban park and public open space) |
| Birchgrove / Snails Bay | Nicholson Brothers | Ferry and launch mooring depot. Closed when the ferry company was bought by Stannard Marine in 1967. | —1967 | |
| Birchgrove / Snails Bay | Fountain's Boatshed | Family-owned boat repair business on the foreshore at 5 Wharf Road. | 1960—now | Still operating |
| Birchgrove / Longnose Point | Jubilee Engineering Co. | Boilermaking and ship repair workshop. It carried out repairs on R.W. Miller ships and other R.W.Miller equipment. It was located on the foreshore at 113 Louisa St. It had relocated from Cameron's Cove, Balmain East in the 1930s. Wound up c.1990. | 1930s—1990 | Two very large houses and a small foreshore park, Yerroulbin Reserve. |
| Birchgrove / Longnose Point | Morrison & Sinclair | Shipyard that made ferries and yachts. | 1923—1970 | Yurulbin Park, which contains some remnants of the old shipyard. |
| Birchgrove / Longnose Point | Storey & Keers | Ship repairers was located on the Parramatta River side of Lousa Road. Company still operates at White Bay and Port Kembla. | | |
| Birchgrove | Balmain Colliery | Colliery and coal wharf. It was the only coal mine within inner-Sydney and is still the deepest in Australia at approximately 800 m. | 1897—1945 | Residential housing, Hopetoun Quays' |
| Rozelle / Iron Cove side | Elliot Bros. / later Australian Fluorine Chemicals / laterMonsanto Chemicals | Chemical plant. This site also provided the last large vehicle access and wharf for transport to and from nearby Cockatoo Island. | c. 1865—c.1990s | Residential Housing, 'Balmain Cove'. |
| Rozelle / Iron Cove side | Electric Light and Power Supply Corporation / later ECNSW / Balmain Power Station | Coal-fired electrical power station that also generated some of its heat energy from incinerating garbage. EL&PSC was nationalised in 1956, and the power station assets became owned and operated by ECNSW. | 1909—1976 | The old power station pumphouse building remains on the site. Part of the old site is now occupied by 'Balmain Shores' apartment complex and part by Bridgewater Park, public open space. There is a public walk along the foreshore from King George Park (west of Iron Cove Bridge) to 'Balmain Shores' apartments on the former Monsanto site. |
| Drummoyne / Iron Cove | Perdriau Brothers, then Dunlop, after 1929 | Rubber and tyre factory. | 1900—1977 | Retail outlets (Birkenhead Point) |
| Drummoyne | Henderson Slip Company | Slipway and marine refit and repair business in St Georges Crescent, Drummoyne. (Later operated by Bailey and Jorgensen.) | 1930s | |
| Drummoyne | Lars Halvorsen Sons | Boat builders | 1924 only | Business relocated to larger premises at Neutral Bay. |
| Chiswick | Lysaght Bros & Co., later BHP / Sydney Wire Mill | Wire mill and wire netting factory. | 1884—1998 | Residential housing developed by Meriton, and a foreshore park known as Wire Mill Reserve. |
| Abbottsford / Fig Tree Bay | Nestlé | Chocolate factory, in a large garden setting on the foreshore of Fig Tree Bay, with a wharf. When opened, it was the largest chocolate factory in the Southern Hemisphere. | 1917—1991 | Residential housing, 'Abbotsford Cove'. |
| Abbotsford / Hen & Chicken Bay | Commonwealth of Australia | Animal quarantine station on 2.38 hectare site. | 1917—1980 | A public reserve known as Quarantine Reserve, which contains many of the old quarantine station buildings. |
| Concord / Hen & Chicken Bay | Farleigh, Nettheim & Co. | Tannery adjacent to a former swampy area. | 1876—before 1970 | Concord High School |
| Concord / Exile Bay | Bushells | Tea and coffee manufacture | 1958—now | Still operating, although there is a plan to close the factory. |
| Concord / Exile Bay | Walters, Middleton and Eades / (later) Tanner & Middleton | Timber yard and wharves. | before WWI—? | Residential housing, 'The Estuary' built c.1993. |
| Concord / Exile Bay | Austral Bronze Crane Copper | Brass foundry, copper and aluminium rolling plant. | 1930— | Residential housing. |
| Cabarita | Wunderlich | Building material for ceilings, including asbestos cement made using asbestos from the company's mines at Barraba and Beaconsfield. The plant was located on the promontory, adjacent to what is now called Prince Edward Park. | 1917-1950s | Southern Can / Containers Limited (See below) |
| Cabarita | Containers Limited (originally Southern Can) | Manufacturing cans for food and drink packaging | 1950s—1982 | Land sold to neighbour Wellcome Australia. Later became part of 'Cape Cabarita'. (See below) |
| Cabarita | Wellcome Australia | Veterinary and horticultural products. | 1919—? | Apartment and townhouse housing with residents-only open space and recreational facilities ('Cape Cabarita'). |
| Cabarita | Dulux Paints (originally 'BALM', British Australian Lead Manufacturers, until 1960) | Paint factory (lead paints) it stood on land fronting Kendall Bay, near Cabarita Park. | 1921—1990s | Redeveloped as housing, 'Kendall Inlet'. |
| Mortlake / Breakfast Point / Kendall Bay | Australian Gas Light Company | Gasworks and coal unloading wharf. | 1886—1990s | Residential housing (Breakfast Point) |
| Mortlake / Green Point | River Quays Marina | Moorings, repair facility, and slipway. The marina's site was the original location of the first Palace Hotel (1886). | ?—c.1995 | Buildings and wharves are still there, but it is no longer operating. |
| Mortlake / Green Point | Transport for NSW / Mortlake Ferry | Cable ferry linking Mortlake to Putney. The last vehicular ferry operating across the Parramatta River or Sydney Harbour. | 1928—now | Still operating |
| Mortlake / Green Point | Allen Taylor and Company | Timber yard. | ?—1942 | Green Point Naval Boatyard (see below) |
| Mortlake / Green Point | Concrete Constructions / Green Point Naval Boatyard | Site used to assemble prefabricated naval launches and other vessels. | 1942—1950s | Part of the area is Wangal Centenary Bushland Reserve, part is now apartments, with a wharf. In the reserve, there is a plaque commemorating the boatyard. |
| Rhodes | NSW State Sawmill | Sawmill | 1900—? | H. McKenzie (see below) |
| Rhodes | H. McKenzie | Timber merchants and joiners | Until 1969 | |
| Rhodes | Tulloch Limited / Phoenix Ironworks | Railway rolling stock maker. | 1913—1974 | Commercial buildings (Rhodes Corporate Park) |
| Rhodes | Philips Industries | Site made Malvern Star and Speedwell bicycles. Philips entered the bicycle business through its purchase of Electronic Industries, which had purchased the brands Malvern Star (in 1958) and Speedwell (in 1965). | c.1970—c.1980 | |
| Rhodes | Various | Ironworks and, in World War II, ship building, on Bray's Bay. | 1914—1985 | Public park with industrial remnants |
| Rhodes | NSW Main Roads Department / Ryde Ferry | Cable vehicular ferry, linking Concord Road, Rhodes and Church Street, Ryde. | 1840s—1935 | Replaced by Ryde Bridge in 1935. |
| Rhodes | John Darling Mills, then Allied Mills from 1960 | Grain milling and stock-feed manufacture. | c.1919 | Redeveloped as high density housing. |
| Rhodes | Timbrol later taken over by Union Carbide | Chemical plant (This facility was between John Darling Mills and Hoskins/CSR.) | 1928—1985 | Redeveloped as high density housing. Land contaminated with chemicals and contamination of the bay sediments. |
| Rhodes | C&G Hoskins | Cast-iron pipe factory The works stood near the Rhodes railway station. | 1911—1930 | Pipe plant moved to Port Kembla, with site reused by CSR Chemicals (see below). |
| Rhodes | CSR Chemicals later ICI | Chemical plant | 1935—1997 | Redeveloped as high density housing. |
| Rhodes | Lewis Berger & Sons and later briefly Orica | Paint factory and wharf. | c. 1916—1987 | Rhodes Waterside Shopping Centre, offices and apartments, and a foreshore park, known as Lewis Berger Park, that contains a war memorial, in the form of a sundial, commemorating ex-servicemen from the former factory. |
| Homebush Bay / Haslams Creek | Radio 2SM | Transmitter site and tower, also used from c.1967 until October 2020 by 2CH, which was earlier at Ermington, Also now used by 2UE. | c.1931—now | Still in use. |
| Homebush Bay / Haslams Creek | Radio 2UE | Transmitter site and tower. The first site was at Lilli Pilli on Port Hacking and opened in 1925 | c.1942—? | Original site no longer used. (See Radio 2SM) Now a BMX track. |
| Homebush Bay / Haslams Creek | Radio 2KY, later known as Sky Sports Radio | Transmitter site and two towers. Same facility also used by 2GB since 2015. | c.1925—now | Still in use. |
| Homebush Bay / southern end | (Unknown) | Ship-breakers’ yard | c.1972 | Partially disassembled hulks of four ships left in Homebush Bay. |
| Homebush Bay / southern end | State Brickworks | Quarrying and brickmaking, with wharf (to send bricks to Blackwattle Bay). The brickworks was serviced by a platform on the former Abbatoirs branch railway line. | 1910—1988 | Olympic Park and wetland for Golden Bell Frog habitat. |
| Homebush Bay / Wentworth Point | Ralph Symonds Limited | Plywood factory, a unique, architect-designed, very large, timber structure, which was itself noteworthy. | 1959—c1980 | Only a part of the building was still standing by October 2025, and was in use as industrial building. Other part of site redeveloped as housing and Marina Square shopping centre. In October 2025, it was stated that the remaining wooden buildings would be replaced by two 50 storey apartment towers. |
| Homebush Bay / Wentworth Point | de Havilland Marine (Large Craft) | Marine vessel building | Until 1982 | Redeveloped as housing |
| Homebush Bay / Wentworth Point | Radio 2GB | Transmitter and tower; the site was chosen because moist ground provides a good earth connection and stronger signal. | c.1926—2015 | Site is now Wentworth Point Park. (2GB's tower was demolished in September 2015. 2GB now shares the site of the 2KY tower.) |
| Homebush Bay / west of Wentworth Point | Saleyards | Livestock saleyard, where livestock were sold by auction. In 1968, the saleyard operations were relocated to this site from Flemington, making way for the new fresh produce markets. It was serviced by a loop line from the Abattoirs branch railway line. | 1968—1988 | Sydney Olympic Stadium is on the old saleyards. |
| Homebush Bay / west of Wentworth Point | State Abattoirs | Government-owned abattoir and saleyards that was serviced by a branch railway line. | 1913—1988 | Part of the old Abattoirs branch railway route was reused as the Olympic Park railway line. |
| Homebush Bay / west of Wentworth Point | Royal Australian Navy | Newington Armament Depot | 1897—1997 | Armament transfer station and Athletes’ Village for 2000 Olympic Games. |
| Clyde / Duck River | Clyde Smelting and Chlorination Works (a.k.a. Clyde Chlorination Works) | A plant for treating pyrite gold ores using the chlorination process (a process pre-dating the cyanide process). It stood on 22 acres between the main railway line and the banks of Duck River. | c.1888—c.1898 | The site was sold in late 1899 to John Howell, who was said to have plans to erect a large smelter, which apparently never occurred. |
| Clyde / Duck River | John Fell & Co. | Oil refinery for processing crude shale oil from Newnes to produce petrol for motor cars. By the time that the refinery opened, crude oil production at Newnes had ceased, and the refinery processed imported conventional crude oil instead. | 1923—1927 | Sold to Shell Oil |
| Clyde / Duck River | Clyde Refinery, Shell Oil | Oil refinery | 1925—2013 | Shell Oil - import and distribution terminal |
| Clyde / Duck River | Redbank Wharf | Deep-water wharf and terminus of a privately owned steam tram line from Parramatta. | c.1883—1943 | |
| Camelia / Sandown | Australian Kerosene Oil and Mineral Company | Oil refinery making 'Southern Cross' kerosene, axle grease, soap and candles. The crude shale oil was made at Joadja and came from there by rail, via Mittagong. | 1887—1894 | Originally part of the Elizabeth Farm estate. Plans are in place for the foreshore industrial area of Camellia to be redeveloped. |
| Camelia / Sandown | The Graziers’ Meat Export Company | Meatworks consisting of slaughterhouse, freezing rooms and canning works—all in one large building—and a wharf. The company changed its name to the Sandown Meat Company in 1897. | c.1897 | (as above) |
| Camelia / Sandown | Sandown Meat Company | Abattoir, probably an expansion of the above meatworks. It was destroyed by fire in May 1923. The coroner returning an open finding on the cause of the fire, and commented that the meat works was grossly over-insured. | 1910—1923 | In 1925, the site was purchased by Ford. |
| Camelia / Sandown | Ford | The old meatworks site was the location of a short-lived Ford car assembly plant. | 1925—1931 | The Ford factory closed in 1931, and all operations went to Victoria. Ford later recommenced assembly at a site on Parramatta Road, Homebush West. Ford sold the land to Shell in 1929. |
| Camelia / Sandown | Australian Cream Tartar Company | Chemical factory (Potassium bitartrate), after 1939, also producing other chemicals (citric acid, tartaric acid and Rochelle Salts). Site of a platform (Cream of Tartar Works), on Sandown railway line. | 1926— | The food technology division became part of AB Mauri and continued to manufacture at the site in 2015. |
| Camelia / Sandown | Goodyear Tyres | Tyre factory and site of a platform (Goodyear), on Sandown railway line. The factory was sometimes called the 'Granville' plant, although it was on the Parramatta River foreshore. | 1927—c.1977 | |
| Camellia / Clyde | James Hardie | Asbestos and asbestos cement factory and site of a platform (Hardies) and siding on the Sandown railway line. | 1919—1996 | |
| Parramatta | Parramatta Gas Company | Gasworks | 1873—1891 | Queens Wharf Reserve, Parramatta |

== Islands and former islands ==
Islands and former islands are shown in order, from east to west. There were originally fourteen islands in Port Jackson, including the Parramatta River. In addition to the twelve islands shown below, there were once two much smaller ones, Bennelong Island and another small island that was connected to the former Dawes Island to form the island now known as Spectacle Island. During the construction of the Fort Macquarie, from 1817 to 1821, the former Bennelong Island was joined to the mainland (Bennelong Point), using material excavated when creating the level area occupied by the fort.

Garden Island, Glebe Island and Berry Island, although now linked to the mainland by reclaimed land, are still known by their original names.

Darling Island is no longer an island and is rarely called by that name; it is now part of the north-eastern part of the Pyrmont peninsula.

| Suburb/Locality | Company/Site | Industry/Function | Years of operation | Current land use / Replaced by |
|---|---|---|---|---|
| Shark Island | Government of New South Wales | Anchorage for quarantine inspection of incoming shipping. | c.1832 | Animal quarantine station (see below). |
| Shark Island | Government of New South Wales | Animal quarantine station. | 1871—1899 | Scenic picnic site, later also a part of Sydney Harbour National Park. The animal quarantine station was moved to what later became the site of Taronga Zoo. |
| Clark Island | Ralph Clark | Vegetable garden | c.1789 | From 1870, a picnic site, except during World War II. |
| Clark Island | Royal Navy | Storage of spare barrels for 14" naval guns. | c.1939—c.1945 | Now a part of Sydney Harbour National Park. |
| Garden Island | Garden Island Dockyard | The island has been a long-term naval base. Construction of the Captain Cook Graving Dock during WWII resulted in the connection of Garden Island to the mainland. | c1866—now | Still in use. |
| Pinchgut / Fort Denison | Fort Denison | Military fortress and lighthouse. | 1862 | Heritage site. Tide forecasts are made relative to this location.. |
| (former) Darling Island (at times, known as Cockle Island, now the north-eastern part of Pyrmont) | Australasian Steam Navigation Company | Wharves and warehouses. | 1851—1899 | Purchased by N.S.W. Government in 1899 (see below). |
| (former) Darling Island (at times, known as Cockle Island, now the north-eastern part of Pyrmont) | Maritime Services Board | Wharves and warehouses. | 1899—1990s | Wharf buildings repurposed as offices and hospitality venues. |
| (former) Darling Island (at times, known as Cockle Island, now the north-eastern part of Pyrmont) | Royal Navy / Royal Edward Victualling Yard | Naval food warehouse. | Opened 1907 | Converted to offices in 1994. For a time, one of the buildings was used by the Defence Science and Technology Group. |
| Goat Island | Queen's Magazine | Explosives storage. | 1839—1900 | |
| Goat Island | Sydney Harbour Trust, later Maritime Services Board | Shipyard and construction depot, also site of Harbourmaster's residence. The shipyard was located on the western side of the island. | 1901—c.1989 | From 1994, Goat Island became a part of Sydney Harbour National Park, but the shipyard remains (see below) |
| Goat Island | Sydney Ship Repair and Engineering | Marine repair and refit business that uses the old MSB shipyard site. | —now | |
| Berry Island | (Various) | Ship breaking yard | 19th-century | Park |
| Glebe Island | Glebe Island Abattoir | Main abattoir for Sydney, which seems to have provided facilities for a number of small operators. The stone buildings of the abattoir were designed by architect Edmund Blacket. By the first decade of the 20th century, there was pressure to relocate this industry to Homebush Bay (where the State Abattoir would open in 1913) or to Camelia / Sandown (where a privately owned abattoir opened in 1910.). | c.1850—1916 | Abattoir buildings were demolished in 1920. |
| Glebe Island | (Various) | Various small industries associated with byproducts of the abattoir, including tanning, candle-making, soap making, 'blood and bone' fertiliser manufacture and tallow making. | 2nd half 19th-century | |
| Glebe Island | Grain Elevators Board | Grain terminal | 1921—1990 | Silos are still standing although no longer in use. Grain terminal transferred to Port Kembla. Wharves reused for containers. |
| Glebe Island | Glebe Island Container Terminal | Container wharves and storage. | c.1990— | All container traffic now passes through Port Botany. |
| Glebe Island | Glebe Island Multi-User Facility | Bulk materials wharf - Last remaining operating deep-water shipping wharves on Sydney Harbour. | Current | Still in use. |
| Cockatoo Island | Cockatoo Island Dockyard | Shipbuilding, dry docks and ship repairs. Site of two dry-docks, the Fitzroy Dock and the Sutherland Dock. | 1857—c.1991 | Public open space, with remnants. |
| Snapper Island | Royal Australian Navy | Naval training depot | 1931—c.1945 | Later a museum, future uncertain. |
| Spectacle Island | Royal Navy, then Royal Australian Navy | Munitions store | RN 1865—1913 RAN 1913—1995 | Naval repository. |
| Rodd Island | Pasteur Institute | Experimental station for biological control of feral rabbits and site for animal vaccine manufacture. | 1888—1894 | Public parkland reserve. |
