= Goodyear railway station =

Former railway station in Sydney, Australia

Goodyear

General information
- Location: Australia
- Coordinates: 33°49′11″S 151°01′44″E
- Operator: CityRail
- Line: Sandown
- Distance: 23.42 kilometres (14.55 mi) from Central
- Platforms: 1
- Tracks: 1

Construction
- Structure type: Ground

Other information
- Status: Demolished

History
- Opened: January 1934

Services
Preceding station	Former services	Following station
Cream of Tartar Works towards Sandown	Sandown Line	Hardies towards Rosehill
Location

Goodyear railway station was a railway station on the Sandown railway line in the then-industrial suburb of Camellia in Sydney, Australia. It opened in January 1934 and served the Goodyear tyre factory in Camellia. The closure of Goodyear station preceded the closure of Hardies and Sandown.

Goodyear was among a number of companies that had private sidings on the line.

== Neighbouring stations ==
Cream of Tartar Works railway station, which was located down from the station, closed in July 1959.
