= Goat Island (Port Jackson) =

Historic site in Sydney, Australia

Native name: Memel; Me-Mel
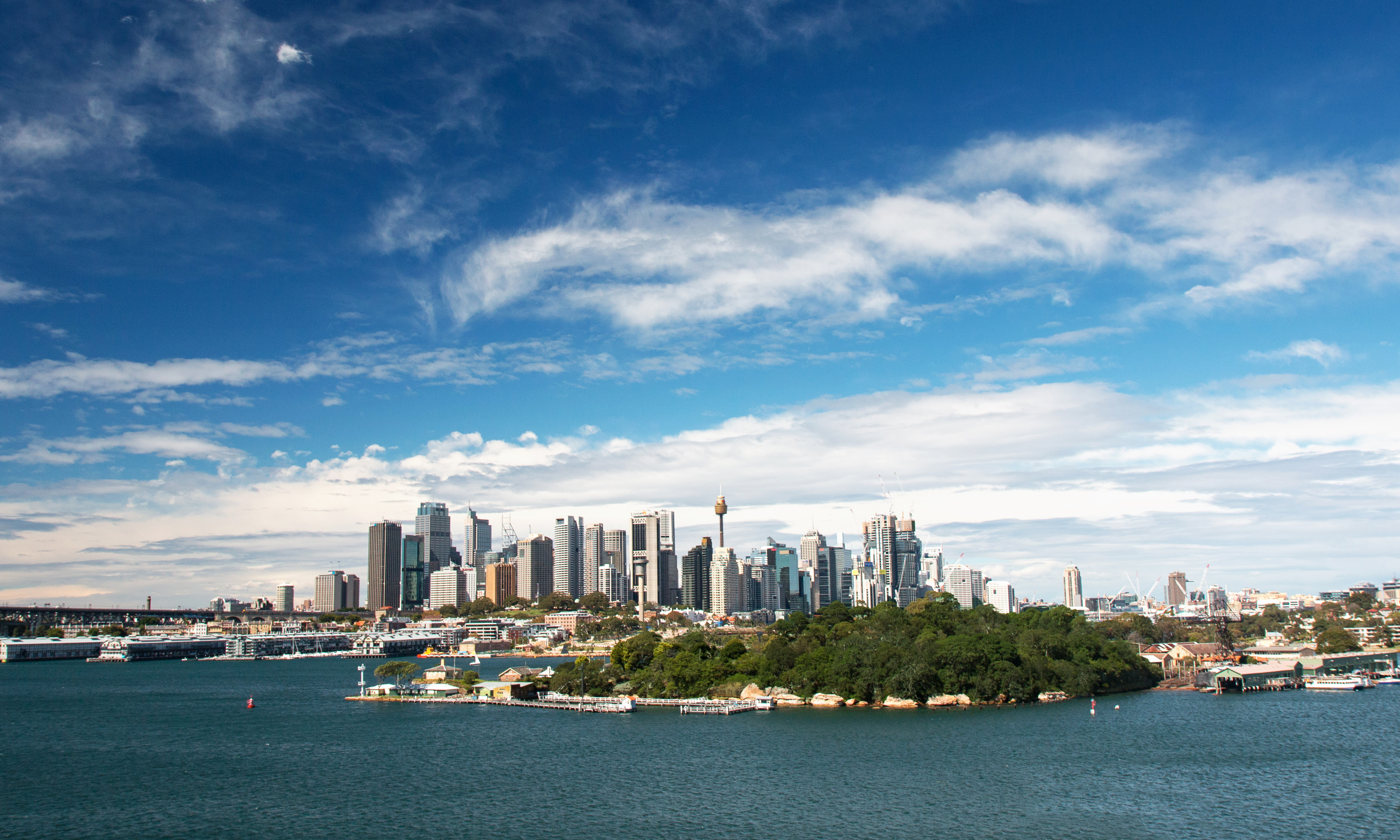
- Goat Island, viewed from Balls Head

- Location of Goat Island in Greater Sydney

Geography
- Location: Port Jackson
- Coordinates: 33°51′08″S 151°11′48″E
- Area: 5.4 ha (13 acres)
- Length: 180 m (590 ft)
- Width: 300 m (1000 ft)

Administration
- Australia

Demographics
- Population: 5

Goat Island
- Interactive map of Goat Island
- Location: Port Jackson, Sydney, New South Wales, Australia

History
- Built: 1826–1994

Site notes
- Architect(s): Edmund Blacket; Alexander Dawson (Colonial Magazine)
- Owner: NSW Office of Environment and Heritage

New South Wales Heritage Register
- Official name: Goat Island; Me-Mel (the eye)
- Type: State heritage (landscape)
- Designated: 2 April 1999
- Reference no.: 989
- Type: Other - Landscape - Cultural
- Category: Landscape - Cultural

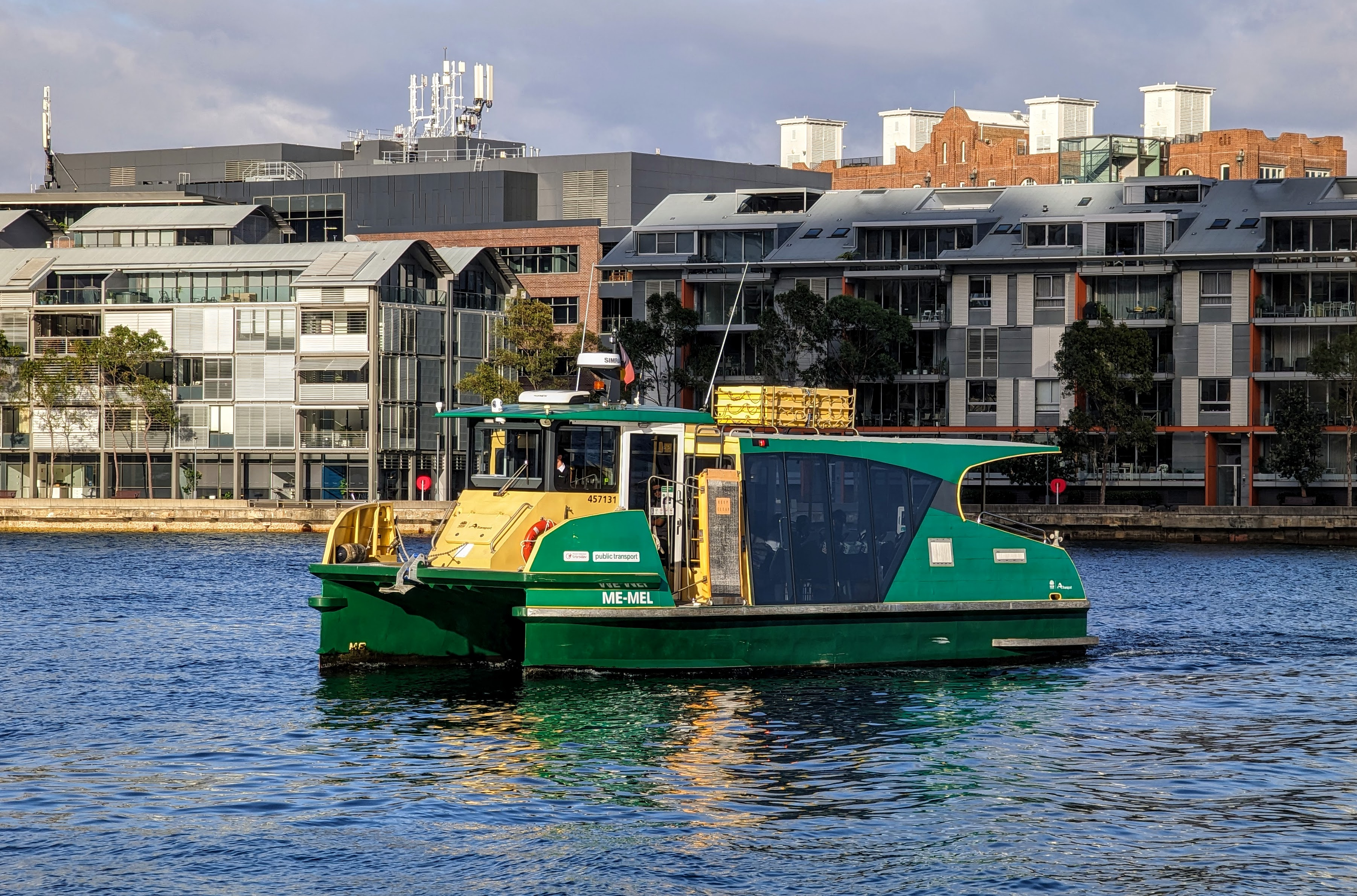
The small ferry Me-Mel is named for Goat Island, but its route between Barangaroo and Blackwattle Bay does not take it by Goat Island.

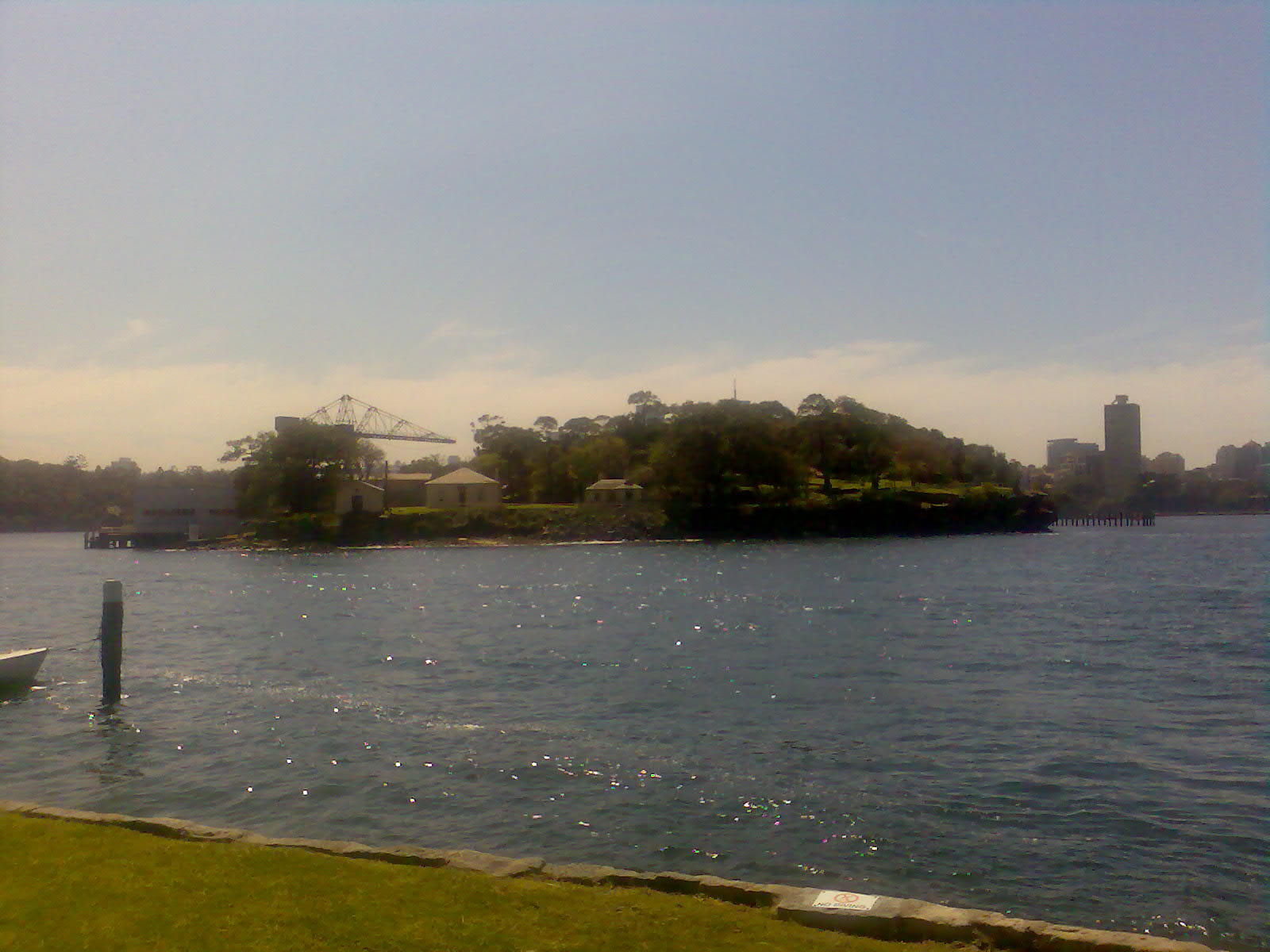
Goat Island from Balmain

Goat Island (Dharug: Me-Mel) is a heritage-listed island located in Port Jackson, in Sydney, New South Wales, Australia. Located northwest of the Sydney central business district, Goat Island is about 300m wide in a north–south direction and 180m long in an east–west direction; and covers an area of 5.4 hectares (13 acres). Goat Island lies off the shores of the Sydney suburbs of Balmain and Millers Point, at the junction of Darling Harbour with the main channel of Sydney Harbour.

The island is a former gunpowder storage, arsenal, bacteriology station, shipyard, powder magazine, maintenance facility and accommodation and now interpretation centre and education facility. Over the years Goat Island has served as a quarry, convict stockade, explosives store, police station, fire station, boatyard and film set. Today the island forms part of the Sydney Harbour National Park. The built facilities on the island were designed by Edmund Blacket and Alexander Dawson and built from 1826 to 1994. Goat Island is also known as Memel or Me-Mel, meaning the eye. The property is owned by the NSW Office of Environment and Heritage, an agency of the Government of New South Wales. It was added to the New South Wales State Heritage Register on 2 April 1999.

== History ==
=== Indigenous history ===
In the Dharug language, Goat Island is also known as Memel or Me-Mel, meaning the eye, by the indigenous Eora people of Port Jackson. Captain David Collins indicated that Bennelong had told him that the island 'was his own property, that it was his father's and that he should give it to By-gone, his particular friend and companion' Bennelong appeared to be 'much attached' to Memel and was often seen there with his wife Barangaroo. How this property transferred from one person to another in the traditional culture was not recorded and why Bennelong should give it to By-gone, was not recorded. Goat Island is the centre of a constellation of green harbour headlands and islands and, as an easy 500 metre paddle from the mainland, was used often by Indigenous people. The island was the birthplace of Bennelong, the Eora elder who served as intermediary between English settlers and Aboriginal populations.

=== Colonial history ===
Confusingly, some early maps of Sydney Harbour show the current Goat Island with the name Cockatoo Island, whilst the current Cockatoo Island is named Banks Island. However, by the late 1820s the naming of the two islands had stabilised at the current situation.

Whilst the use of Goat Island as both a naval arsenal and a convict stockade were discussed during the late 1820s, the first use of the island was in 1831, as a sandstone quarry. This use set the tone for much of the later life of the island, with the first of many bureaucratic disputes between the colony's local civil government and the local military establishment who reported directly to the War Office in London. In this case the Surveyor General, Major Thomas Mitchell, objected to the quarrying on the grounds that what was being quarried away was a valuable point for the purpose of defence, and quarrying soon ceased.

By the early 1830s increasing amounts of gunpowder for public works were in storage in Sydney prompting Governor Bourke to implement Darling's proposal for the construction of an arsenal or magazine on Goat Island. Its convenient location, isolation from the centre of population, ability to be made secure and accessibility for large ships made it an obvious choice. The work was initially supervised by the Commissary, a committee or Board of Works and William Buchanan as Clerk of Works. In 1833 gangs of convicts started work quarrying stone and levelling ground on a site at the south-western side of the island. The powder magazine was completed by January 1839, and is a substantial, stone-built, bomb-proof construction. It was during this original period of construction that the convict Charles Anderson was said to have been kept chained to a rock for two years. A stone cut couch, with fixing points for a platform and the wooden lid said to have provided him with shelter, can still be seen.

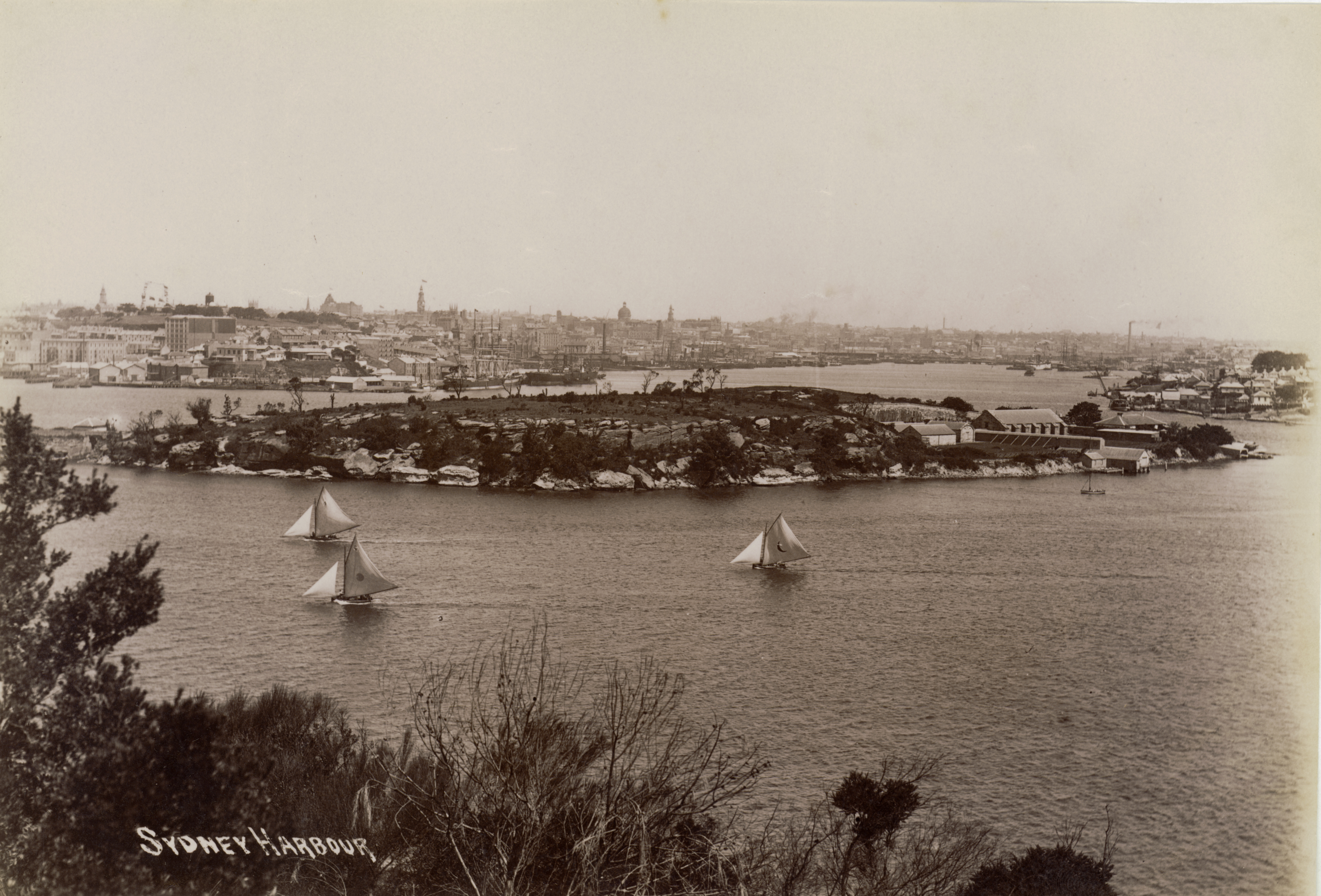
Goat Island, Port Jackson, 1898-1901

Construction began in January 1833 by ironed gangs from the hulk "Phoenix", who began quarrying to level the ground. In 1834, three portable wooden houses surrounded by a stockade were erected on the island to avoid the loss of time involved in the daily ferrying of the convicts from the hulk. The work went slowly and in May 1835 the foundations were finally commenced. Newly arrived Commanding Royal Engineer George Barney took control of the construction in January 1836 and immediately instructed Thomas Bird to prepare plans of the buildings already underway. In his report to the Inspector General of Fortifications the following month he commented that the plan was defective but that work was so far advanced that work on the buildings would be completed by the end of 1836.

In August 1836 the Legislative Council passed an Act for better regulating the keeping and carriage of gunpowder. Among other things it made the Officers of Ordnance responsible for the custody of gunpowder. Work was completed in January 1839. During construction, the magazine, cooperage, barrack and convict accommodation, wharf, stone walls, well or tank, garden, water channels, wet ditch and blacksmith's shop had been erected. Most of these structures are still extant.

In October 1835 the Committee on Police and Gaols recommended that the water police be relocated from Longnose Point to Goat Island. This was finally agreed to in January 1837 when Barney proposed the use of convict labour to construct a wet ditch across a small segment of Goat Island. Colonial Architect Mortimer William Lewis prepared a design for the proposed Water Police station which went to tender in June 1838. The station was constructed at the north-eastern tip of the island and at the opposite end from the magazine. For defensive reasons, and to provide a clear boundary between the domain of the police, part of the colonial civil government, and that of the military magazine, a water level ditch was cut to separate the north-eastern tip of the island from the bulk of the island. This 'cut' can still be seen today.

=== Queen's Magazine ===
The Ordnance or Queen's Magazine on Goat Island was intended to store gunpowder belonging to the British government and by arrangement that owned by the Colonial administration. As a safety measure, the Act William IV, No. 7 of 1836 decreed that privately imported gunpowder in the possession of merchants also had to be stored in government care, pending its use. The Colonial administration arranged that privately owned gunpowder be stored in the Queen's Magazine on Goat Island. By 1847, the storage of privately owned gunpowder was causing a problem as it was taking up much of the storage space in the magazine. The problem was exacerbated by the 1840s depression which saw many of the private owners bankrupted. This left the Ordnance with a large amount of deteriorating gunpowder which in 1847 the Colonial Architect was requested to remove. The Colonial Secretary instead requested that the Ordnance permit the construction of a Colonial magazine on Goat Island which was refused. An acrimonious correspondence ensued. The matter was resolved in 1850 when Colonial Architect Edmund Blacket was requested to prepare a plan and estimate for a merchants' gunpowder magazine on Goat Island. Blacket's design abandoned the conventional fireproof barrel vault with its massive walls in favour of a thin-skinned structure with a light roof substantially supported by, and tied to, the interior racking system with conventional windows and shutters at the gable ends. The design was criticised but the administration overruled the objections on the grounds that the design was economic and the construction period would be shorter than using a conventional design.

In 1854 a new Colonial Magazine was constructed to the north of the existing magazine, which became known as the Queen's Magazine. This was a building of much lighter construction, and was intended for the storage of civilian explosives belonging to the colonial government and local merchants. In 1864 the police station was converted into a laboratory for the preparation of cartridges, requiring the building of a bridge over the cut. The water police were moved to Kirribilli. In the 1870s magazines were built on the east side of the island to house the new explosive dynamite. By this time most of the storage of propellant powders and cartridge manufacturing had moved to nearby Spectacle Island.

The increase in mining and public works in the second half of the 1850s resulted in an increased demand for gunpowder, which again resulted in the inability of the magazines to cope with storage requirements. This necessitated in the hire of the brig Lady Mary as a temporary floating gunpowder magazine in 1856. In June 1859 it was decided to construct another magazine on Goat Island using Colonial Architect Alexander Dawson's 1856 plan. The design was similar to the Colonial magazine, but introduced an iron roof which again raised concern amongst military men. The magazine was completed in December 1859.

In 1861 the Colonial Secretary raised concerns that the quantity of gunpowder stored on Goat Island was sufficient to "send half of Sydney to the other world." A spectacular explosion in a small store of nitro-glycerine in Bridge Street in 1866 further added to this concern. The Water Police were removed from Goat Island in 1865 and the laboratory for cartridge preparation relocated to the Water Police area in 1866. The use of new blasting preparations such as gun-cotton, nitro-glycerine and lithofracteur at this time further exacerbated these concerns as gun-cotton and nitro-glycerine were more susceptible to accidental explosion. New storage facilities were required as far away from the gunpowder as possible. By 1875 a magazine was erected south-west of the cut, with another to follow by 1878. The laboratory again had to be relocated.

In 1875 the Storage of Gunpowder Board raised concerns with the somewhat casual attitude of safety and security on Goat Island and recommended that the merchants gunpowder be removed. From the 1870s - 1890s considerable alterations and additions were made to structures on Goat Island. Little physical evidence of this work survives.

=== Other use ===
In 1900 all explosives were removed from Goat Island. The island is believed to have been used for a period in that year as a bacteriology station, for the investigation of the major outbreak of bubonic plague in the nearby Rocks district, but firm evidence for this usage is lacking. What is certain is that by 1901 the island had become the depot for the Sydney Harbour Trust, responsible for the maintenance of that body's significant fleet of tugs, dredgers and other floating plant. Over the following years until the mid-1920s, the island saw the construction of a harbour master's house on the highest point of the island, together with four cottages for married members of the fireboat crew stationed on the island, and a barracks for the unmarried members of the same crew. The land west of the cut was vested in the Governor of NSW.

In 1901 the island was vested in the newly formed Sydney Harbour Trust who had acquired responsibility for Sydney Harbour. The Trust used Goat Island as a depot constructing wharves, berthing facilities, coal-store, 4 cottages, Harbour Masters Residence and workshop as well as making major alterations and additions to the former barrack and cook house. Between 1925 and 1931 the Trust developed a shipyard which consisted of spillways, installation of cranes, rail system and conversion of the Expense Magazine and Colonial Magazine.

Between 1925 and 1931 the magazine area to the south-west of the island was converted into a shipyard for the repair of the trusts vessels and floating plant. Over the following years this has grown to include four slipways, of 450 tonnes (500 short tons), 140 tonnes (150 short tons) and 11 tonnes (12 short tons) (x2) capacity respectively, plus a 230-metre (770 ft) wharf. The Colonial Magazine was recycled as a shipwright's workshop, whilst the Queens Magazine became a general store. The Trust was replaced in 1936 by the creation of the Maritime Services Board which had expanded responsibilities encompassing the entire state. Goat Island was the home of the Board's Fire Brigade during the war and accommodated 26 men and the families of several of the married men. Plans for a community hall were drawn in 1941 and shark-proof swimming baths was erected. Tennis courts had been erected earlier - possibility in 1937.

=== History post World War II ===
During the 1940s and 1950s construction of wharf, storage and shipyard facilities were carried out. The island was also a popular centre of social activities such as tennis and dances during this time.

The Maritime Services Board finally relinquished control of the island and in 1995, and in May 1994 administrative control of Goat Island was transferred to the NSW National Parks & Wildlife Service (NPWS) for incorporation into Sydney Harbour National Park. The sub-district office of the NPWS Sydney Harbour Islands is now located on Goat Island.

In October 2016, the state government announced its intention to return the island to Aboriginal hands. Premier Mike Baird said "Goat Island has enormous cultural heritage significance for Aboriginal people. We are committed to ensuring Aboriginal leadership in management and decision-making for the sustainable use of Goat Island." The government has taken its first steps to transfer management and ownership of the island to its traditional owners. The Premier will establish a working group to investigate means of transferring management while continuing existing operations on the island, protecting its heritage and maintaining public access. Former Prime Minister Paul Keating has long campaigned for the island's return. Former state MP Linda Burney's last question to Parliament before she left for federal politics was about returning ownership of the island. Minister for Aboriginal Affairs Leslie Williams said "future opportunities (included) increasing public access and sharing cultural experiences". On 29 May 2022, the NSW Government announced that Goat Island would be returned to Aboriginal ownership within four years. Prior to this, $42 million is to be spent on the island's restoration, including repairs to seawalls and buildings as well as upgrades to the wharf, access and services, and the removal of asbestos.

== Description ==
Goat Island is located in Sydney Harbour, west of the Harbour Bridge between McMahons Point and Balmain. Goat Island is a prominent island in Sydney Harbour. There is little vegetation on the island.

=== Condition ===
By December 2000, the condition of fabric varied from good to poor. Some of the metal in roofs and cranes such as the hammerhead crane were rusting. Termites had attacked some of the timber structures. The archaeological potential of Goat Island is high. The integrity and intactness is high. The structures retain enough of their original fabric to enable their form, function and interrelationships to be easily read and understood.

=== Modifications and dates ===
Considerable modifications have been made to many of the structures. Many of structures are not in original condition and have been altered or have had major additions added in accordance with the needs of the various occupying authorities.

== Goat Island in popular culture ==
During the mid-1990s to the early 2000s, the island was used as a film-set for the Australian television series Water Rats.

The island has also played host to rock concerts from Midnight Oil in 1985 and Green Day in 2000. Both were presented by radio station Triple J. Goat Island recently reopened to the public, with tours available on weekdays. Goat Island was also included in the 2010 Crave Sydney International Food Festival's Sydney Harbour Island Hopping Tour.

Panic at Rock Island, an Australian telemovie, was filmed on the island in 2010. On 24 March 2011, Foo Fighters performed a secret show on the island to 300 people. On 19 November 2013 Kings of Leon performed on the island in front of 600 people presented by Foxtel's Channel V.

== Heritage listing ==
As at 24 March 2000, the Colonial Magazine is historically significant as probably the oldest surviving magazine built to store merchant's powder in Australia, evidence of the growing need for storage of privately owned gunpowder in the expanding colony of New South Wales. It has historical associations with its designers, Colonial Architects Edmund Blacket and Alexander Dawson, and despite the loss of original structural arrangement retains some ability to demonstrate its former use as a magazine facility for the storage of gunpowder. The building also has some historical significance as part of the shipbuilding establishment on Goat Island since 1925. The building is aesthetically significant mainly for the technical innovation of its design which departed from the military standard typified by the adjacent Queen's Magazine. The Colonial Magazine is also technically significant for the surviving evidence of its construction and use, and for the archaeological evidence likely to be present beneath and around the building.

Goat Island was listed on the New South Wales State Heritage Register on 2 April 1999 having satisfied the following criteria.

The place is important in demonstrating the course, or pattern, of cultural or natural history in New South Wales.

Goat Island is a harbour island which demonstrates all the phases of use and development from Precontact Aboriginal occupation to the present day. Its almost continuous use since the 1820s for a variety of activities related to the operational management of Sydney Harbour by various government agencies is significant as is its value as part of the historic landscape which now forms Sydney Harbour National Park. .

It is the site after 1833 of the first major facility for the storage of ordnance and explosives in both government and private hands. It is also the site of the first permanent establishment of the Water Police in Sydney Harbour. It has associations with Royal Engineer George Barney and Colonial Architect Edmund Blackett. Goat Island was also the emergency centre for bacteriological research during the 1900 outbreak of bubonic plague. After 1901 it was the shipyard and base for port management operations by the Sydney Harbour Trust and its successor the Maritime Services Board.

The place is important in demonstrating aesthetic characteristics and/or a high degree of creative or technical achievement in New South Wales.

Goat Island is of considerable aesthetic significance. It is one of several prominent Sydney Harbour islands that contribute to the overall beauty and pattern of the harbour. It is visually prominent at the confluence of Port Jackson, Darling Harbour and the Parramatta River. The Queen's magazine's powerful architectural qualities are complemented by the unusual design of the contemporary stone cooperage, barrack buildings and perimeter walling. The use of sandstone and slate enhances the overall aesthetic qualities. The magazine's aesthetic qualities are further enhanced by the topographical setting on the south western edge of the island and by the curved alignment of the stone security wall. The variety, extent and pattern of wharves, is unusual in such a concentration and provides a rich visual interplay between the rhythm of the piles and the rocky foreshore.

The place has strong or special association with a particular community or cultural group in New South Wales for social, cultural or spiritual reasons.

Goat Island is of State, regional and local significance. It is an example of the State's response to the need to provide a safe storage facility and distribution point for both publicly (both Imperial and Colonial) and privately owned explosives. As an island isolated in Sydney Harbour, Goat Island during the Sydney Harbour Trust/ Maritime Services Board periods provided a place for accommodation, work, as a shipyard and operational depot and recreation for a variety of people for a period of over ninety years. It is of local significance for the people who lived and worked on the island and of regional significance for what it can tell us of the living conditions of the people who lived and worked on the island in the 20th century.

The place has potential to yield information that will contribute to an understanding of the cultural or natural history of New South Wales.

The research and historical archaeological potential of Goat Island are high. It has been continuously occupied since 1833. It has the ability to demonstrate the layering of use and occupation over a period of 150 years, including those earlier facilities that were adapted for later functions. Surviving physical evidence can demonstrate the life styles and working conditions of a diverse range of occupants and staff on the island, during all phases of development from Pre-European to the late 20th-century activities of the Maritime Services Board.

The place possesses uncommon, rare or endangered aspects of the cultural or natural history of New South Wales.

It includes The Queen's Magazine with its barrel vault, massive external buttressing and detailed ventilation system, is the earliest large powder magazine.

The place is important in demonstrating the principal characteristics of a class of cultural or natural places/environments in New South Wales.

The facilities on the island are representative of the maritime industrial activities that were once common around the inner harbour and the Parramatta River. The variety of cultural and landscape forms and plantings on the island are representative of the period.

== See also ==
- Sydney Heads
- Sydney Harbour National Park
