= Sandown Park railway station =

Sandown Park Railway Station can refer to:

- The railway station in Melbourne, Australia: Sandown Park railway station, Melbourne
- The railway station in Sydney, Australia: Sandown railway station, Sydney

Esher railway station is adjacent to Sandown Park racecourse in England.
