= MSB Stores Complex =

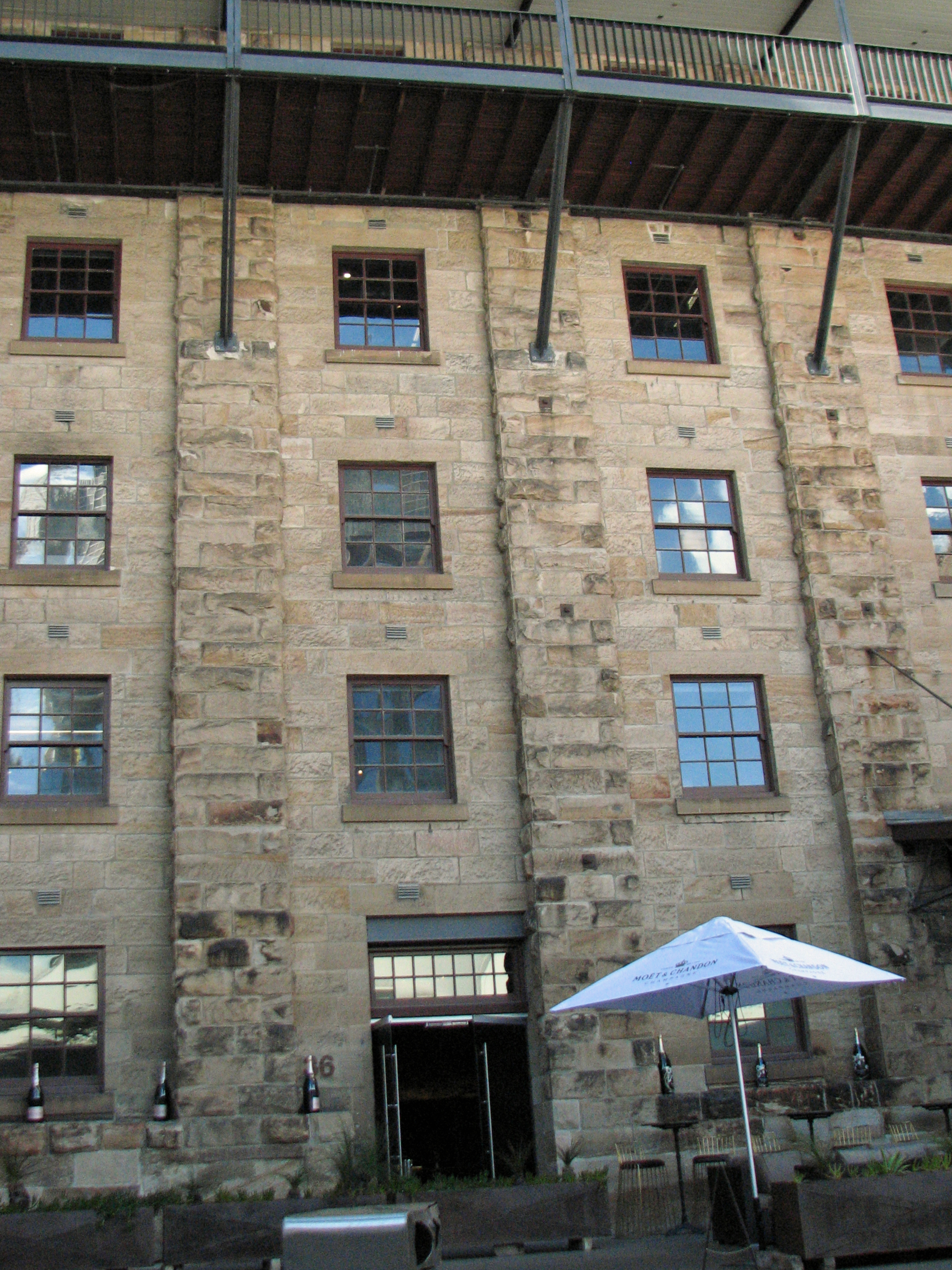
- MSB Stores Complex from Hickson Road forecourt

- Location within Sydney Location within Australia
- 33.8625°S 151.2032°E
- Location: 2–4 Jenkins Street, Millers Point, Sydney, New South Wales, Australia

History
- Built: 1844–

Site notes
- Architectural style: Victorian Georgian

New South Wales Heritage Register
- Official name: MSB Stores Complex; MSB Office and Store; Australian Gas Light Company Stores and Offices
- Type: State heritage (built)
- Designated: 18 April 2000
- Reference no.: 1435
- Type: Warehouse/storage area
- Category: Transport – Water

The MSB Stores Complex is a heritage-listed former warehouse and gas manufacturing plant and now offices and storage located at 2–4 Jenkins Street in Millers Point, Sydney, Australia. It was built from 1844. It is also known as Maritime Services Board Office and Store and Australian Gas Light Company Stores and Offices. It was added to the New South Wales State Heritage Register on 18 April 2000.

== History ==
In July 1839, the Australian Gas Light Company (AGL) purchased land for the Gasworks. Construction commenced soon after with the works including the construction of a retort room, purifying room, forge, wharf and gasboilers. In 1844 AGL decided to build a store and cottage on the site. The buildings were designed by Henry Ginn, and John Morris was the chosen builder. The stone used for the construction of the buildings was quarried on the site by Morris after the quarrymen refused to supply the material. During the construction, an old retaining wall collapsed revealing a ledge of rock approximately 4-metre (13 ft) high and nearly vertical. It was recommended that the east wall of the warehouse be erected on this ledge. The AGL Secretary received the keys to the new building on 5 April 1845. John Morris leased the cottage and one of the floors of the new warehouse building. By the end of 1845, the five storey warehouse building, a workshop (constructed by Morris) and the cottage stood above the Gasworks in Jenkins Street.

By the end of 1868 Building 1 existed in its present form, incorporating the cottage and infill structure, and a one-storey section at the southern end which was later demolished. In c. 1899 – c. 1900, an addition was constructed at Hickson Road level to house the Carburetted Water Gas Plant. The Gasworks continued to operate until September 1921 when the Sydney Harbour Trust took over. The Trust used the Building 1 as a store and renovated the top floor to include offices in 1923 and again in 1950s. There were additions and changes made to Building 2, including the replacement of original flooring with a new slab c. 1966.

Building 1 was later used by the Marine Ministerial Holding Corporation as a storage and warehouse facility, while Building 2 had been used to provide amenities and changerooms for Maritime Services Board employees, prior to the abolition of both organisations.

== Description ==
The MSB Stores complex comprising two buildings. Building 1 is a five-storey sandstone building constructed on a cliff presenting a single (top) storey to Jenkins Street and incorporates a former stone cottage built at the same time and a later addition which make up the two storey section of the building to the south. (Refer to SHI:4920063 for more detail on Building 1.) Building 2 is sited below the southern section of Building 1. Building 2 is built of brick with arched windows and doors. The original structure appears to have comprised a single open space about 16 feet high with loft area above. There have been at least two additions to the building and a number of changes to the detailing, e.g. the arched windows have been replaced with rectilinear paned windows and the arched openings bricked up. The original flooring has been replaced by a new concrete slab which is supported by the original steel floor beams and ornate cast iron columns which were apparently from another site. Internally, Building 2 has undergone substantial refurbishment to provide amenities and changerooms for MSB employees, with little original features and none of the original equipment remaining.

A public stairway, fabricated from steel, to the right of the rear of the building, which faces Jenkins Street, provides access to the forecourt of the front of the building, which faces Hickson Road.

== Modifications and dates ==
=== Building 1 ===
- 1851: Addition of timber cantilevered balcony top floor western wall.
- 1858: Addition of one storey office room.
- 1868: Extension to link warehouse and cottage, including "false" front wall to cottage, continuation of office/warehouse details and parapet, and other improvements.
- 1899: Construction of Carburetted Water Gas Plant.
- 1923: Sydney Harbour Trust removed balcony, south west parapet and interior partitions.
- 1950s: Amenities and partitioning to top floor.
- early to mid-1990s: some stone conservation work undertaken.

=== Building 2 ===
- 1950: Addition of wedge shaped single storey room extending to Hickson Road.
- 1960s: Replacement of slab to mezzanine of original building, addition of cast iron columns; addition of upper storey which cantilevers out beyond the lower floor addition forming loading bay, addition of concrete slab on bondek to upper storey of addition.

== Heritage listing ==
The MSB Stores complex is of historical significance as Sydney's first gas manufacturing plant and gasworks, and illustrates the early development and subsequent growth of the organisation. The complex is of significance for its association with the port facilities and maritime activities of Darling Harbour and its role in the historical, social and physical development of Sydney. It has strong associations with prominent persons and organisations such as the Australian Gas Light Company (AGL), Sydney Harbour Trust, and Maritime Services Board. It contains the oldest remaining above ground structure from Sydney's first gas manufacturing plants and a purpose-built brick structure constructed by the AGL to house specialist equipment (Building 2). It represents the development of AGL and gas technology and provides evidence of the way in which the structures were altered to suit various uses and occupants.

MSB Stores Complex was listed on the New South Wales State Heritage Register on 18 April 2000 having satisfied the following criteria.

The place is important in demonstrating the course, or pattern, of cultural or natural history in New South Wales.

The MSB Stores complex is significant as integral part of Sydney's first gas manufacturing plant and gasworks, illustrating the early development and subsequent growth of Australian Gas Light Company. It is significant for its association with the port facilities and maritime activities of Darling Harbour. It is associated with architects Ginn Hilly & Mansfield, and with organisations such as the Australian Gas Light Company, Sydney Harbour Trust, and Maritime Services Board. Building 1 is the oldest remaining above ground structure from the Sydney's first gas manufacturing plant and gasworks. Building 2 is significant for the part it played in representing the development of AGL, being specifically constructed to house specialist equipment.

The place is important in demonstrating aesthetic characteristics and/or a high degree of creative or technical achievement in New South Wales.

The MSB Stores complex contains a fine example of warehouse in the Victorian Georgian style, significant for its use of stone quarried on the site. The aesthetic significance of Building 2 has been reduced due to the heavily modified facades and interior, and the two storey addition which abuts the western facade.

The place has a strong or special association with a particular community or cultural group in New South Wales for social, cultural or spiritual reasons.

The complex is associated with the supply of gas to the community and later with the port and maritime facilities of Darling Harbour which played an important role in the social and physical development of Sydney.

The place has potential to yield information that will contribute to an understanding of the cultural or natural history of New South Wales.

Building 1 of the complex is of scientific significance as the oldest remaining above ground structure from Sydney's first gas manufacturing plants.

The place possesses uncommon, rare or endangered aspects of the cultural or natural history of New South Wales.

The complex contains a rare example of a Victorian Georgian style harbourside warehouse of the early Victorian period using traditional construction materials and techniques.

== See also ==
- Australian non-residential architectural styles
