= Cream of Tartar Works railway station =

Demolished railway station in Sydney, New South Wales, Australia

Cream of Tartar Works

General information
- Location: Australia
- Coordinates: 33°49′13″S 151°02′02″E
- Operator: Department of Railways
- Line: Sandown
- Distance: 23.656 kilometres (14.699 mi) from Central
- Platforms: 1
- Tracks: 1

Construction
- Structure type: Ground

Other information
- Status: Demolished

History
- Opened: 7 March 1927
- Closed: July 1959

Services
| Preceding station | Former services | Following station |
|---|---|---|
| Sandown Terminus | Sandown Line | Goodyear towards Rosehill |
Location

Cream of Tartar Works railway station was a railway station located on the Sandown railway line in the then-industrial suburb of Camellia in Sydney, Australia. The station opened 7 March 1927 and served the Australian Cream Tartar Company factory in Camellia. It closed in July 1959, the same year the Sandown line was electrified in August.

Cream of Tartar was among a number of companies that had private sidings on the line.
