= Hardies railway station =

Demolished railway station in Sydney, New South Wales, Australia

Hardies

General information
- Other names: Hardie's Platform
- Location: Australia
- Coordinates: 33°49′10″S 151°01′30″E
- Operator: CityRail
- Line: Sandown
- Distance: 22.95 km (14.26 mi) from Central
- Platforms: 1 (1 side)
- Tracks: 2

Construction
- Structure type: Ground

Other information
- Status: Demolished

History
- Opened: 4 April 1938 (88 years ago)
- Closed: 19 December 1991 (34 years ago)
- Rebuilt: 18 June 1959 (67 years ago)
- Electrified: Yes (from 1959)

Services
| Preceding station | Former services | Following station |
|---|---|---|
| Goodyear towards Sandown | Sandown Line | Rosehill Terminus |
Location

Hardies railway station was a suburban railway station located on the Sandown line, serving the James Hardie Industries factory in the Sydney suburb of Camellia.

== History ==
The Sandown railway line opened as a private railway on 17 November 1888, but no platform was provided at Hardies. The first Hardies station opened 4 April 1938, and served the nearby James Hardie Industries factory in Camellia, which at that time was fully industrial.

On 18 June 1959, the original platform was replaced by a new one located on the up track on the Sandown side of the Grand Avenue level crossing. On 10 August 1959, electric passenger services began operating along the Sandown line using "red rattlers", which ceased on 19 December 1991.

=== Hardies Sidings ===
Hardie was among a number of companies that had private sidings on the line. These were named Hardies Asbestos Siding (originally the Asbestos Slate and Sheet Manufacturing Siding), which opened on 25 October 1916, and Hardies Asbestos Siding No. 2, which opened on 1 May 1926. Both sidings were connected separately to the line and were removed on 13 November 1990.

== Description ==
The second Hardies station consisted of a single wooden platform built on brick piers. The platform was accessed by a ramp, and metal railings were installed for passenger safety. The Hardies Asbestos Siding split from the Sandown line at the start of the platform face.
