= Sandown railway line =

Defunct railway line in Sydney, New South Wales, Australia

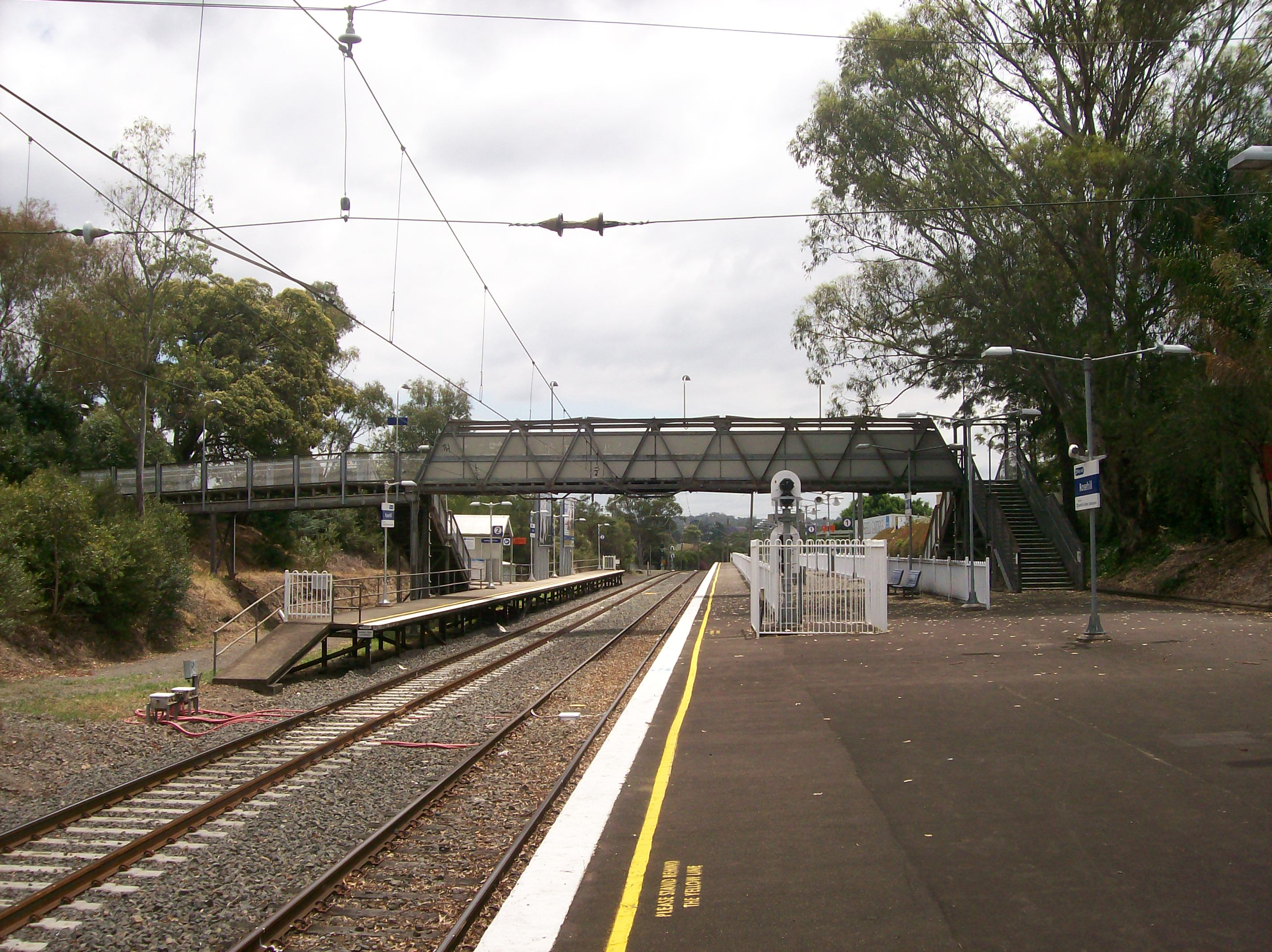
- Looking down the Sandown line platform of the now-demolished Rosehill station

Overview
- Status: Converted to light rail
- Owner: Transport Asset Manager of New South Wales
- Locale: Sydney
- Stations: 5 (closed)

History
- Opened: November 1888
- Closed: 1 July 2019 (as heavy rail)

The Sandown railway line is a short former heavy rail line, partially reutilised to access a light rail depot, in the western suburbs of Sydney, New South Wales, Australia.

== Line description ==
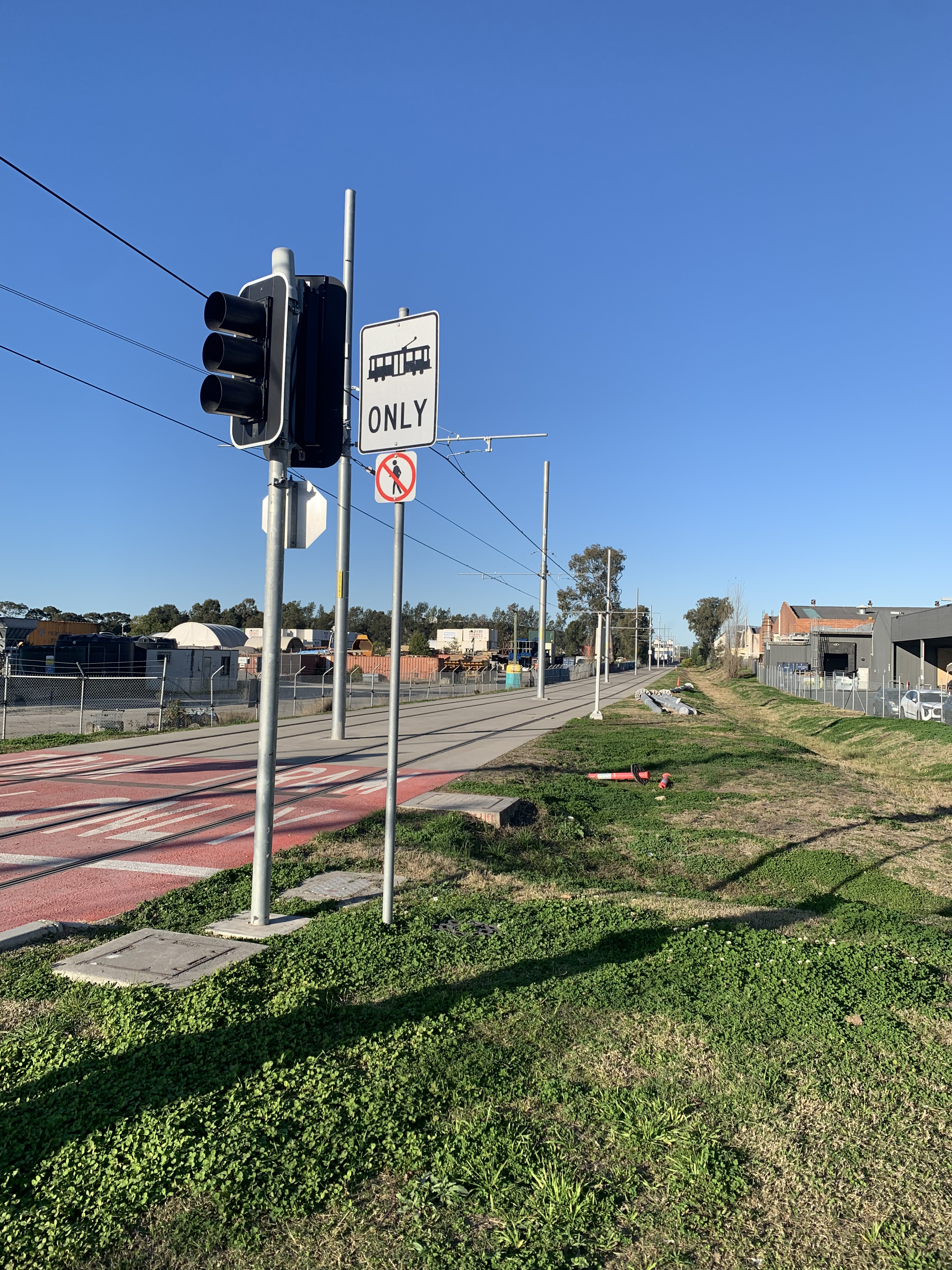
The Sandown line corridor, now leading to a light rail depot.

The line diverged from the Carlingford line just south of Camellia station.

It had three simple passenger stations, Sandown, Hardies and Goodyear; additionally, a platform called Cream of Tartar Works closed prior to electrification. The closure of Goodyear station preceded the closure of the remaining two.

The Sandown line served a number of factories and industrial sites including a number of sidings and a marshalling yard known as Commonwealth Sidings that were added in 1943 to service a large military stores complex. There was a short branch line from the Commonwealth Sidings marshalling yard to Redbank Wharf and adjacent sidings. Another connection from Commonwealth Sidings joined the Carlingford line to the south of Rosehill station. The Commonwealth Sidings and marshalling yard and the southern connection progressively fell out of use after the end of the Second World War and were either removed or adapted for other uses and the branch line to Redbank Wharf was altered to connect with Sandown yard and then progressively dismantled.

== History ==
The Sandown Line began life as the Bennett's Railway, opening on 17 November 1888. It was electrified in 1959.

When electrified, the Sandown Line carried an electric suburban service to serve the surrounding industrial area. Passenger services for the Abattoirs line were operated by CPH railmotors operating from Sandown via Lidcombe until November 1984.

Passenger service to Sandown ceased on 19 December 1991, while goods service ended in June 2010. The line's racecourse platform at Rosehill continued to be used by special charter trains up to 2019.

The overhead wires were removed in December 2002. Traffic was officially suspended and a Stop Block placed across the tracks on the Sydney side of Access Rd level crossing in October 2016.

The western end of the line was utilised by the Parramatta Light Rail project to provide access to a stabling and maintenance facility. This saw the line officially closed which was gazetted for 1 July 2019. The section of the Carlingford line from where the Sandown line diverges to the Parramatta Road level crossing was also set for closure. Removal of the line and tracks began in July 2019. The branch was also considered for being incorporated into Stage 2 of the Parramatta Light Rail network, connecting Camellia and Olympic Park.

== See also ==
- Railways in Sydney
- List of closed Sydney railway stations
