= Spectacle Island (Port Jackson) =

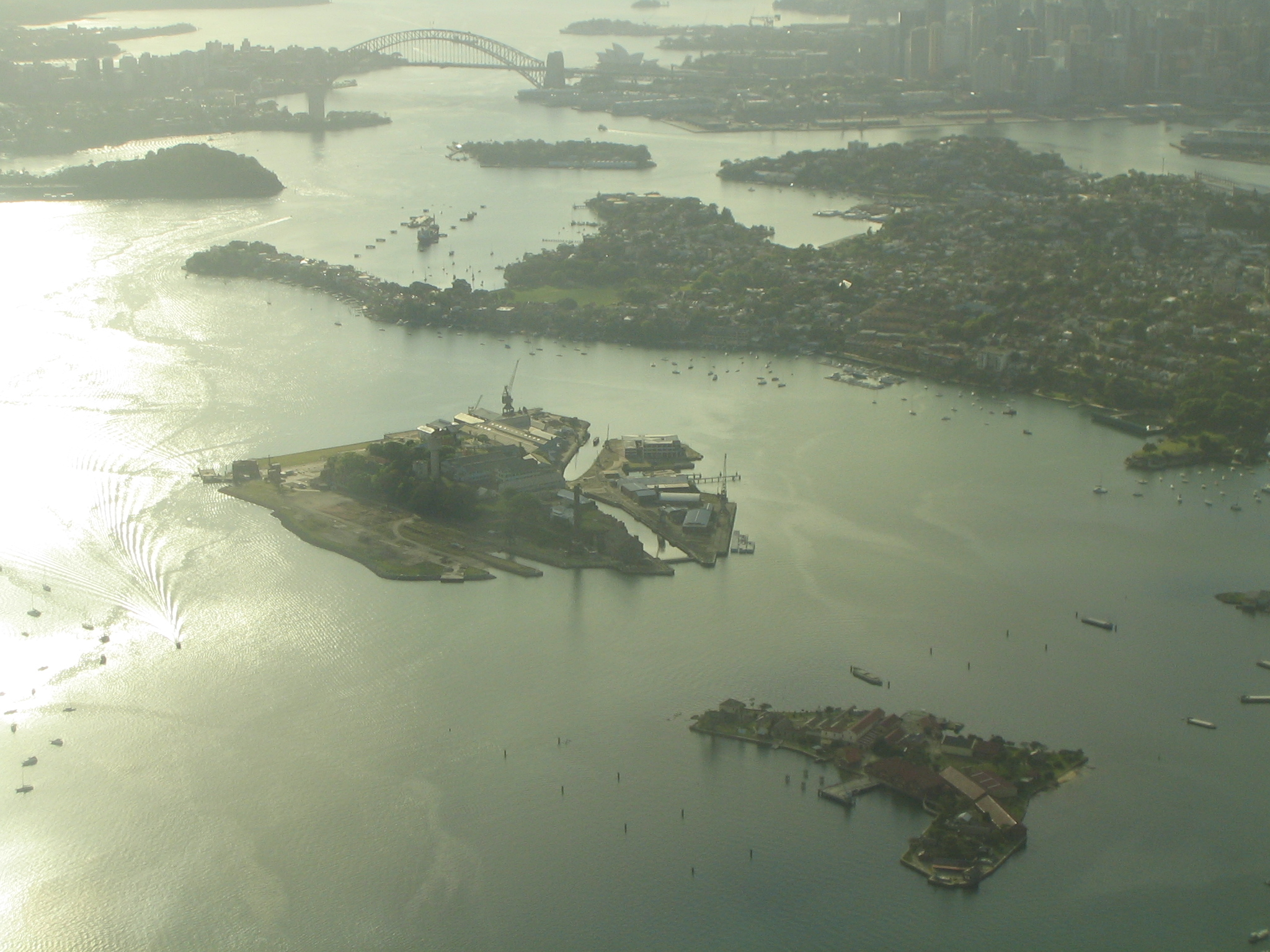
- Spectacle Island (front) and Cockatoo Island (rear), Sydney Harbour

- Coordinates: 33.849°S 151.164°E
- Country: Australia
- State: New South Wales
- City: Sydney
- Location: 11 km (6.8 mi) west of Sydney CBD
Localities around Spectacle Island
	Sydney Harbour
Drummoyne	Spectacle Island	Cockatoo Island
	Sydney Harbour

Spectacle Island is an island in the Parramatta River and Sydney Harbour, in Sydney, Australia. It lies in the main channel of the western section of the harbour, upstream of the Harbour Bridge, adjacent to the Sydney suburb of Drummoyne. It was first known as Dawes Island.

The island is historically significant as it is the oldest naval explosives manufacturing and storage complex in Australia (from 1865). Originally built to store government gunpowder, the complex was converted to store naval munitions in 1893, for which purpose it hosts storesheds, jetties and an internal railway system. The island has been significantly increased in size by the use of waste from the nearby Balmain Colliery.

Today, the island is a depository of heritage items of the Royal Australian Navy, and also is the home of Training Ship Sydney, a unit of the Australian Navy Cadets.

Spectacle Island was added to the Commonwealth National Heritage List in June 2004.

== History ==
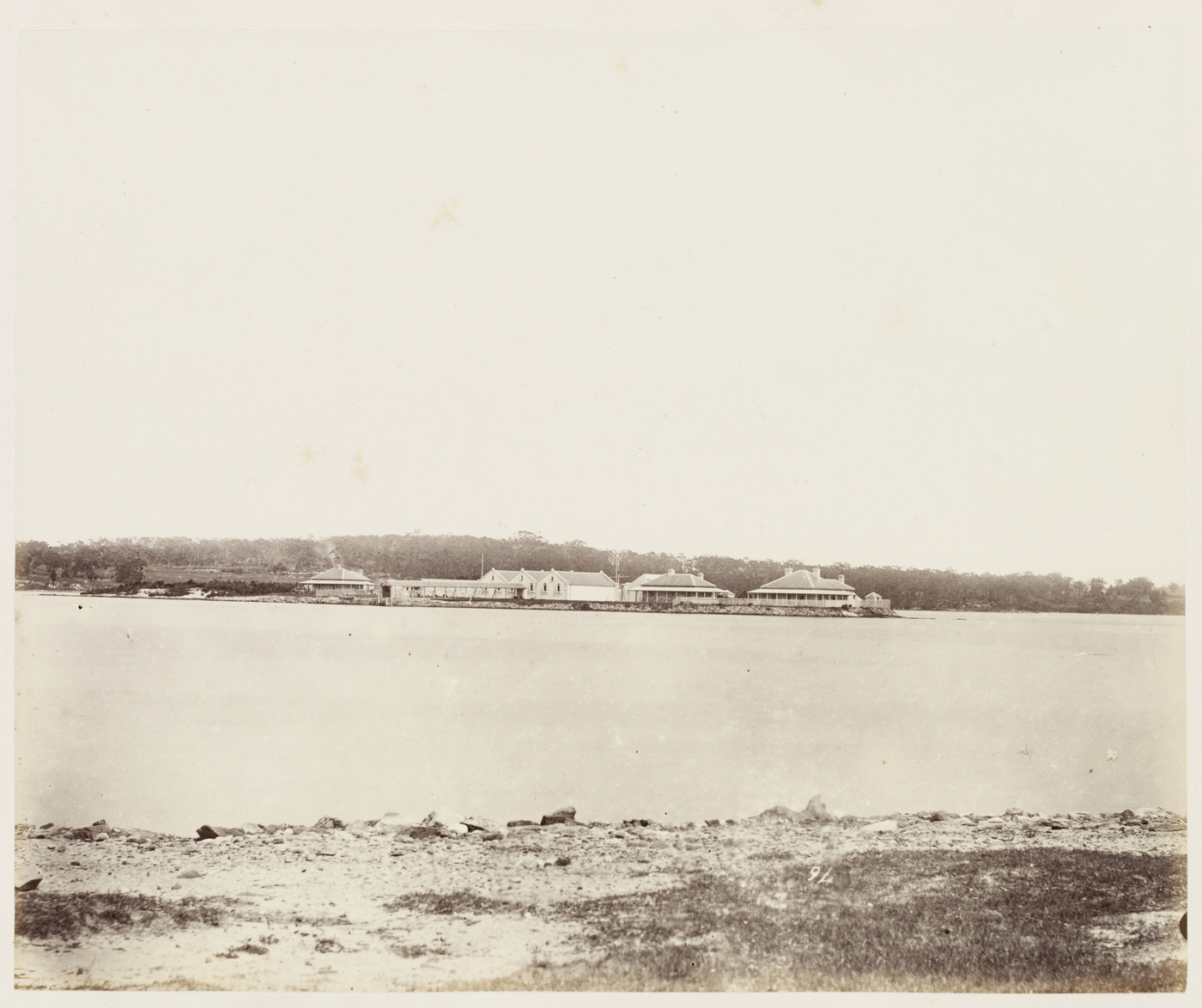
Spectacle Island viewed from the east, 1872. Buildings (l-r): labourers' house, covered way, main magazine, residences.

Spectacle Island is a small island in Sydney Harbour which was first known as Dawes Island as early as the first year of British settlement in 1788 but was later renamed Spectacle because of its shape, being then two small islands joined by a narrow isthmus.

The colonial government selected Spectacle Island in 1865 as a storage site for the colonial government's gunpowder. Plans for the initial group of buildings (centred around the three-bay main magazine) were drawn up in the office of Colonial Architect James Barnet. The buildings were mainly built of sandstone and had slate roofs; a pair of civilian residences (which later served as the offices and house of the officer in charge) were given verandas. Before long, more buildings were added; the shape of the island began changing as well, and the isthmus was gradually built up.

In 1884 Spectacle Island became the naval armament depot and the colonial government's explosives were removed. Existing buildings were altered and new ones were constructed to suit the new military needs, and the completed installations were at the forefront of munitions handling and storage technology at the time.

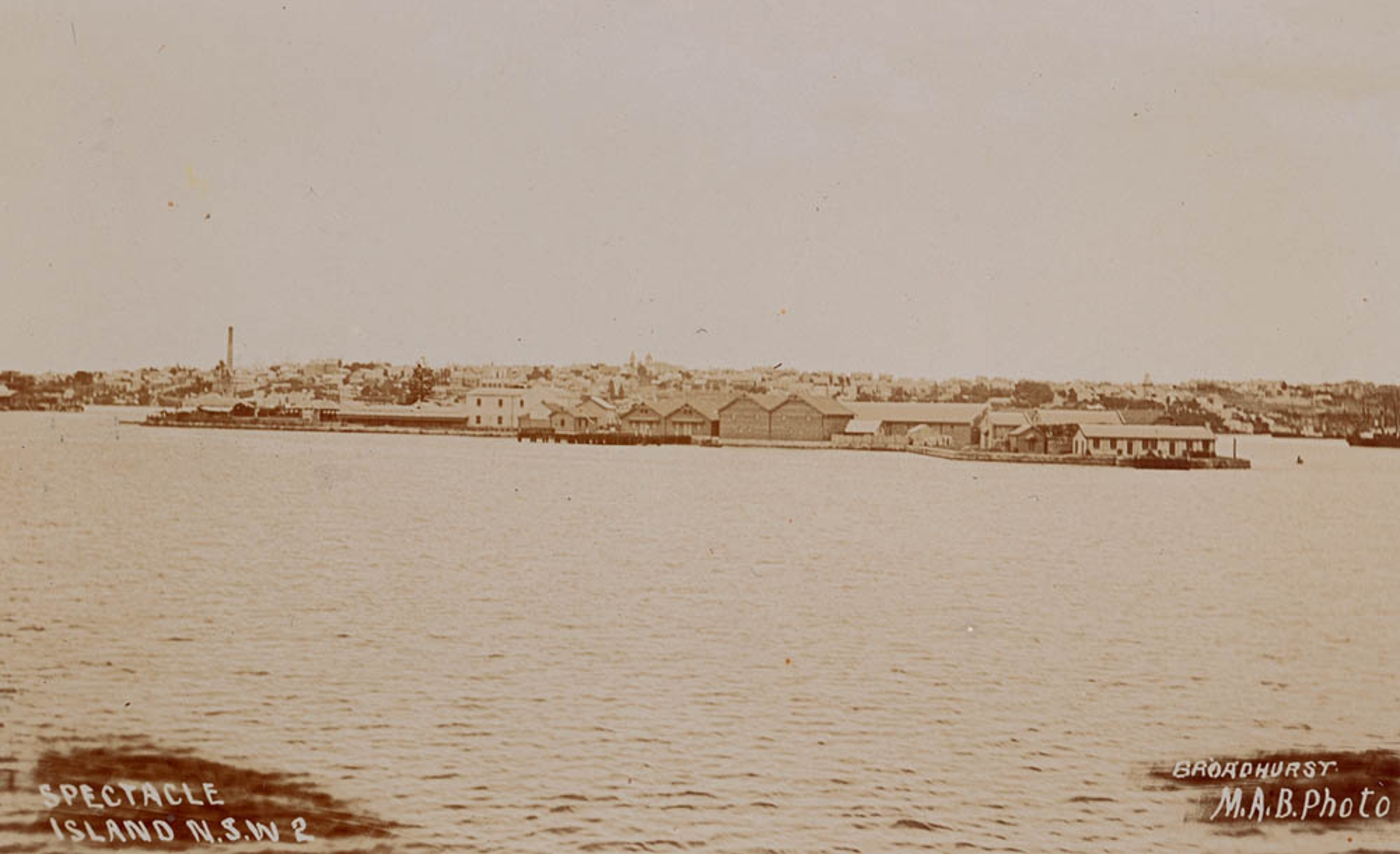
Viewed from the north-west, early 20th century; buildings include filled-shell stores (centre) and laboratory complex (right).

The Royal Australian Navy took over Spectacle from the Royal Navy in 1913. By then, there were 40 buildings on the island, the isthmus had been filled in and the area of the island had been increased by about a hectare through reclamation works utilising spoil from the old Balmain coalmine.

During the First World War there was hectic activity on the island and several hundred extra workers were appointed, mainly for shell-filling. Older buildings were remodelled to better deal with new needs. With the end of the war in 1918, Spectacle was used to store unused munitions until they were eventually dispersed. By 1922 all the major permanent buildings had been built.

Spectacle Island once again played an important role in the Second World War in dealing with smaller calibre ammunition, but was soon unable to cope with larger calibre material. After the war the island again was used to store unused munitions. Gradually, Spectacle's role changed with the growth of harbourside populations and technological change making the island's role of explosives handling and storage untenable and obsolete.

== Present day ==
Spectacle Island is still used by the Royal Australian Navy to house the Naval Repository, including a collection of relics and artefacts, ranging from small items to vessels.

The island is now home to Training Ship Sydney, a unit of the Australian Navy Cadets.
