= Rosehill railway station =

Former railway station in Sydney, Australia

Rosehill
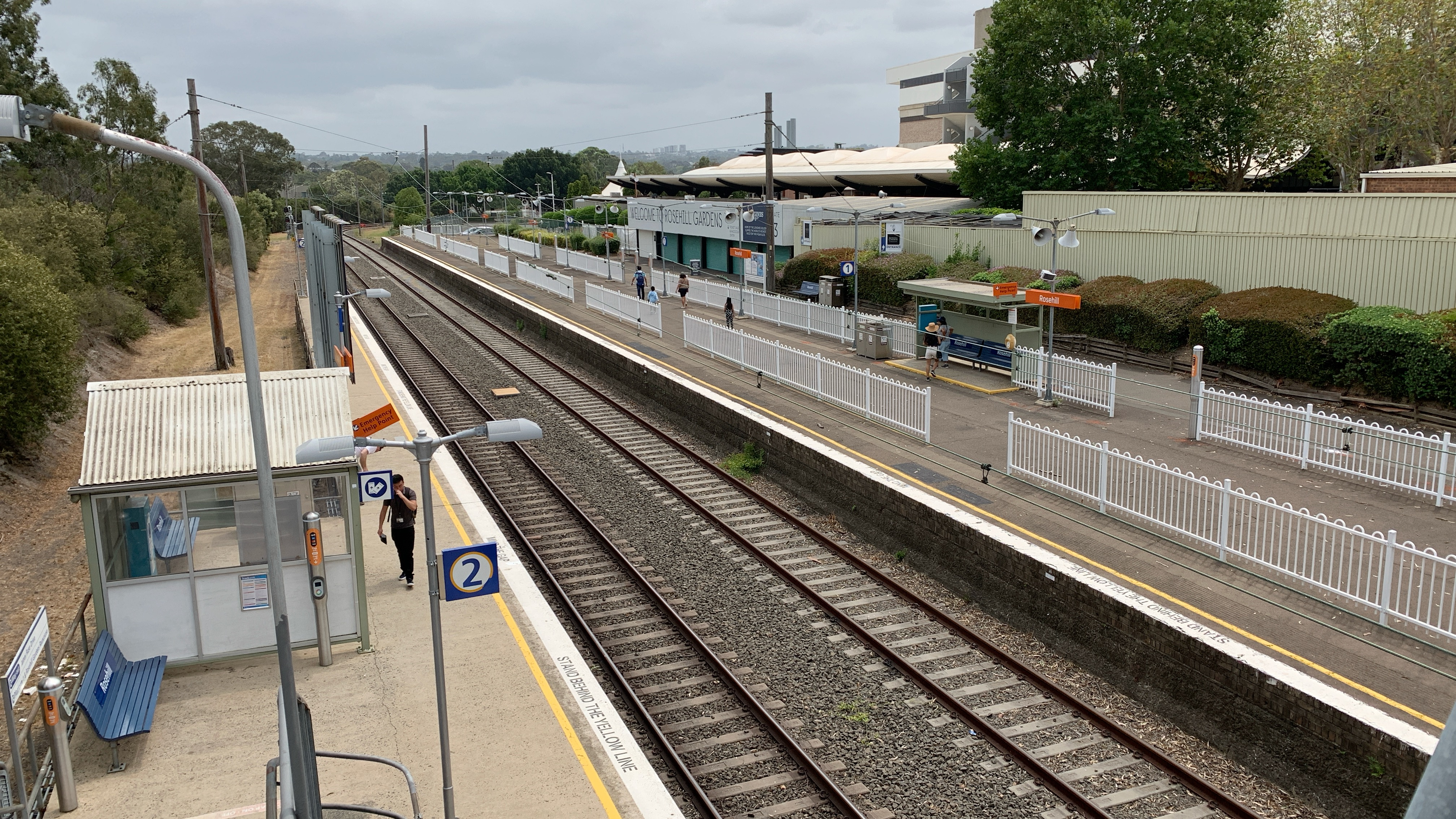
- Northbound view of the station platforms and buildings, 12 days before closure, December 2019

General information
- Location: James Ruse Drive, Rosehill; Sydney, New South Wales; Australia
- Coordinates: 33°49′24″S 151°01′19″E
- Owner: Transport Asset Manager of New South Wales
- Operator: Sydney Trains
- Lines: Carlingford; Sandown
- Distance: 22.42 km (13.931 mi) from Central
- Platforms: 2 (2 side)
- Tracks: 2
- Connections: Bus

Construction
- Structure type: Ground

Other information
- Status: Demolished
- Station code: RSL
- Website: Transport for NSW

History
- Opened: 17 January 1888 (138 years ago)
- Closed: 5 January 2020 (6 years ago)
- Rebuilt: 14 May 1959 (67 years ago)

Passengers
- 2013: 100 (daily) (Sydney Trains, NSW TrainLink)
- Rank: 247

Former services
Preceding station	Sydney Trains	Following station
Camellia towards Carlingford	Carlingford Line (1885–2020)	Clyde Terminus
Preceding station	Former services	Following station
Hardies towards Sandown	Sandown Line (1959–1991)	Terminus
Location

Rosehill railway station was a suburban railway station located on the Carlingford line and Sandown line, serving the Sydney suburb of Rosehill. It was located next to and originally opened for the Rosehill Gardens Racecourse, and was open between 1888 and 2020. It served passengers on the Sandown line until 1991, and the T6 Carlingford Line until closure in 2020.

== History ==
Rosehill station opened on 17 January 1888. The station was relocated on 14 May 1959.

The station was located at the end of a double track section from the Main Western line junction at Clyde. The station had two platforms, a four car platform on the Carlingford branch, and a 16 car platform on the Sandown line, which was used by Rosehill Gardens Racecourse trains on selected race days. Immediately south of the former platform 2 is a protected tree with a dilapidated fence around it.

=== Closure ===
The majority of the Carlingford railway line has been converted to light rail as part of the Parramatta Light Rail project. The entirety of the Carlingford Line, including Rosehill railway station, closed on 5 January 2020 and the Sandown Line closed in July 2019, to enable light rail construction to proceed.

Rosehill railway station was demolished in late 2022 to make way for the construction of the Clyde Stabling and Maintenance Facility as part of the Sydney Metro West Project.

== Services ==
=== Platforms ===
At the time the station closed the platforms had the following services:

Platform	Line	Stopping pattern	Notes
1	T6	special events for Rosehill Gardens Racecourse only, former Sandown Line platform	
2	T6	services to Carlingford services to Clyde	

=== Transport links ===
Transdev NSW operated one route via Rosehill station:

- M92: Parramatta station to Sutherland station

Rosehill station was served by one NightRide route:

- N61: Carlingford station to City (Town Hall)

== Trackplan ==
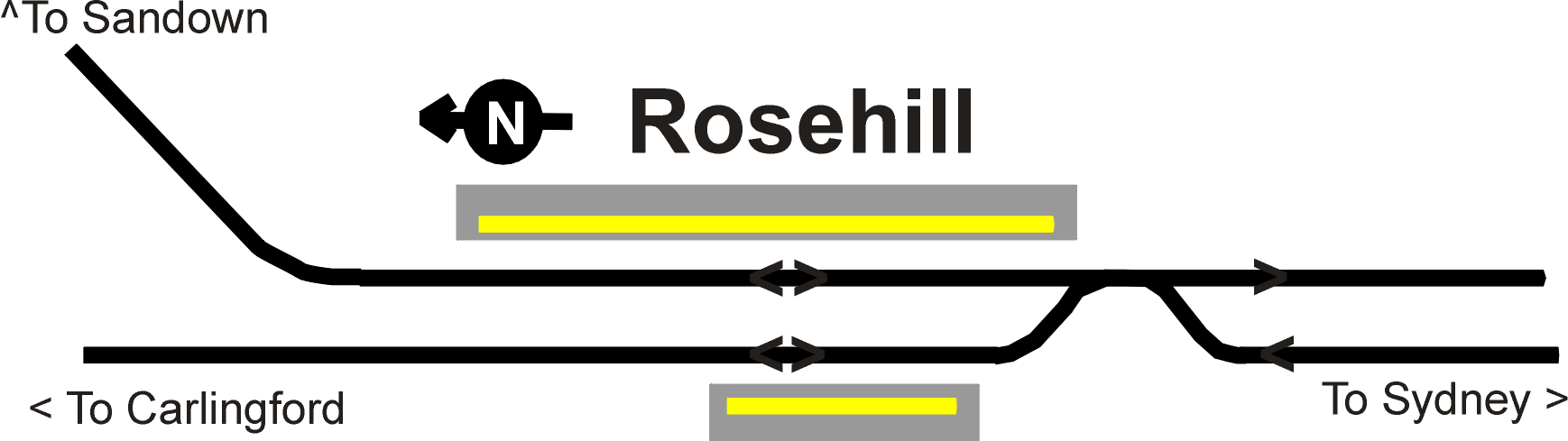
Track layout
