= Sandown railway station, Sydney =

Former railway station in Sydney, New South Wales, Australia

Sandown
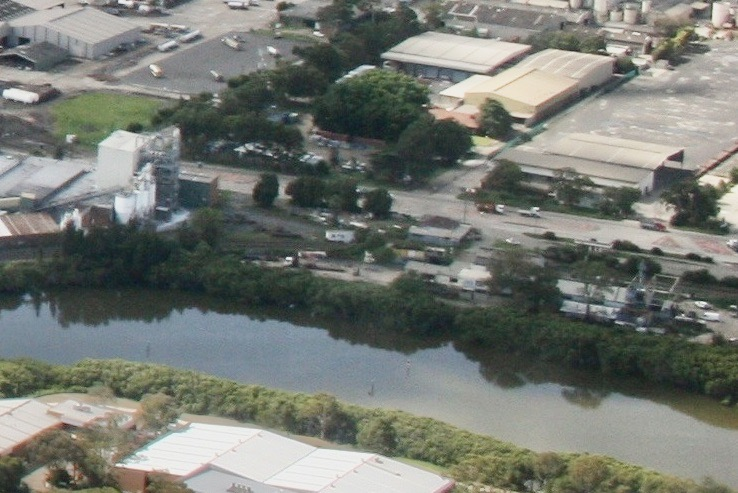
- Aerial view of the location of the former platform near the line's dead-end

General information
- Location: Grand Avenue, Camellia; Australia
- Coordinates: 33°49′10″S 151°02′16″E
- Operator: CityRail
- Line: Sandown
- Distance: 24.23 kilometres (15.06 mi) from Central
- Platforms: 1 (1 side)
- Tracks: 1

Construction
- Structure type: Ground

Other information
- Status: Demolished

History
- Opened: 24 October 1892 (133 years ago)
- Closed: 19 December 1991 (34 years ago)

Services
Preceding station	Former services	Following station
Terminus	Sandown Line	Cream of Tartar Works towards Rosehill
Location

Sandown railway station was a suburban railway station and the terminus of the Sandown railway line, serving the then-industrial Sydney suburb of Camellia.

== History ==
Sandown station opened on 24 October 1892. The station was situated adjacent to the Parramatta River and was the location for a container terminal as well as a refinery tanker loading facility. Public electric train services on the Sandown line commenced on 10 August 1959.

Passenger services from Sandown to the Abattoirs line were operated by CPH railmotors operating via Lidcombe until November 1984. Passenger services to Sandown ceased on 19 December 1991. The Sandown line officially closed on 1 July 2019, with a section of the corridor set aside for use as part of the Parramatta Light Rail.

A signal box, the Steel Plate loading platform and sidings belonging to the refinery were located beyond Sandown. A siding branched off the line just before the platform.

== See also ==
- Clyde Refinery
