= Maritime Services Board =

Defunct statutory authority of the Government of New South Wales

Agency overview
- Formed: 1 February 1936
- Preceding agency: Department of Navigation Sydney Harbour Trust
- Dissolved: 30 June 1995
- Superseding agency: Waterways Authority
- Jurisdiction: New South Wales
- Headquarters: Sydney
- Key document: Maritime Services Act 1935 Parliament of New South Wales

The Maritime Services Board was a statutory authority of the Government of New South Wales responsible for marine safety, regulation of commercial and recreational boating, and oversight of port operations.

== History ==
The Maritime Services Board (MSB) was established on 1 February 1936 pursuant to the Maritime Services Act taking over the functions of the Department of Navigation and Sydney Harbour Trust. Originally headquartered at Circular Quay, in December 1952 the MSB moved to the Maritime Services Board Building on George Street.

In 1989, the MSB moved to the Maritime Trade Towers on Kent Street. On 30 June 1995 the MSB was disbanded with its functions taken over by the Waterways Authority.

== Publications ==
All a'Board was launched as the MSB's house organ in November 1962.
