= Timeline of Sydney =

Coordinates: 33.859972°S 151.211111°E

The following is a timeline of the history of the city of Sydney, New South Wales, Australia.

== Pre-Colonial ==
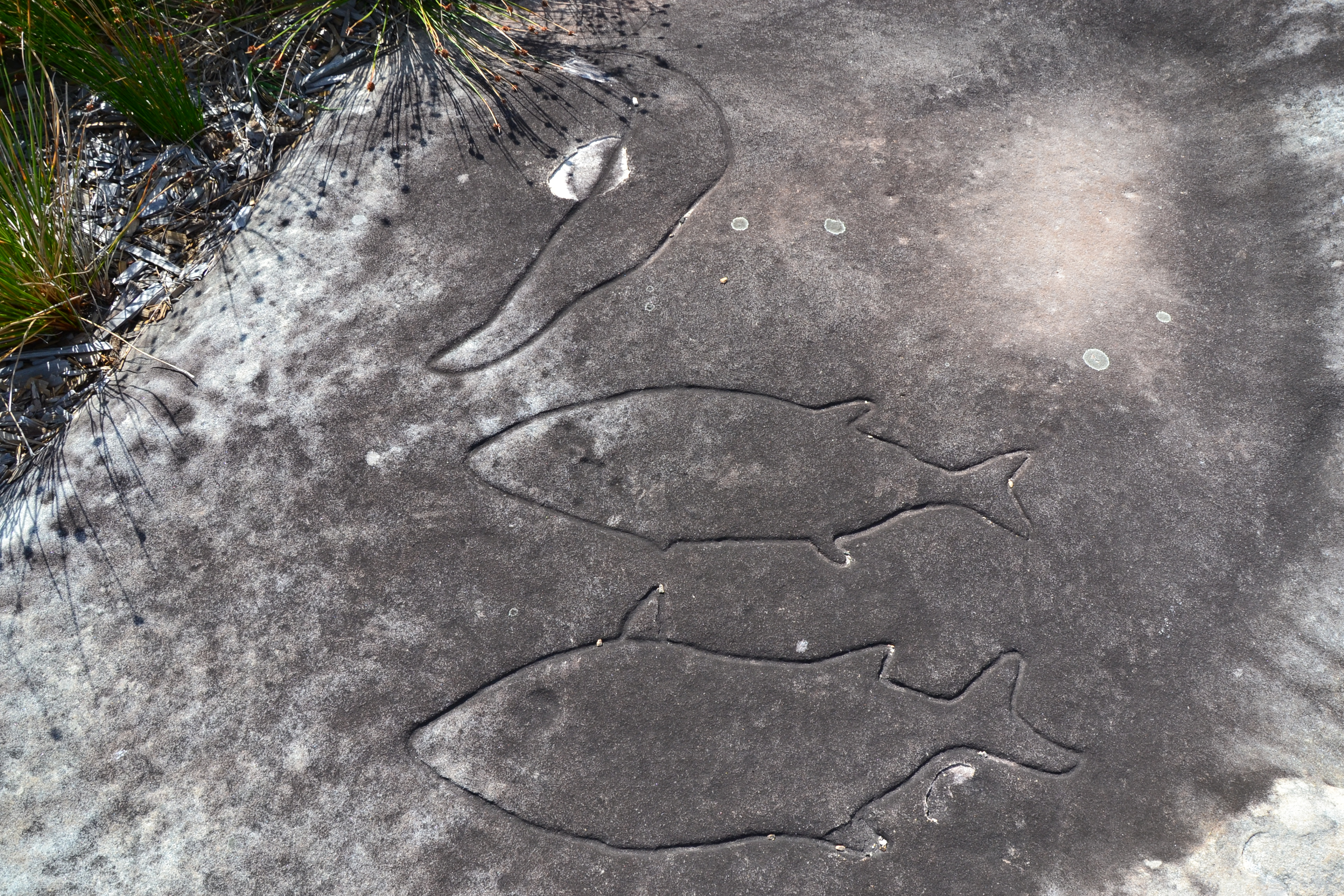
Whale carvings in Bondi

- 50,000–45,000 BP – Near Penrith, a far western suburb of Sydney, numerous Aboriginal stone tools were found in Cranebrook Terraces gravel sediments dating to this time period; at first when these results were new they were controversial. More recently in 1987 and 2003, dating of the same strata has revised and corroborated these dates.
- 30,000 BP – Radiocarbon dating suggests human activity occurred in and around the Sydney basin, as evidenced by an archaeological dig in Parramatta, in Western Sydney. The finds show that the Aboriginal Australians in that region used charcoal, stone tools and possible ancient campfires.
- 21,100–17,800 BP – Stone artifact assemblages dating to this time period discovered in Shaws Creek (near Hawkesbury River) and in Blue Mountains. A rock shelter with flakes dating to this period discovered near Nepean River.
- 5,000–7000 BP – The Sydney rock engravings, a form of Australian Aboriginal rock art consisting of carefully drawn images of people, animals, or symbols, date to this time period.
- 4,000–2,000 BC – The first backed stone artifacts developed, such as blades and spears. The stones would drill, scrape, cut and grind material. They were also associated with woodworking.
- 1,000–500 BC – Bone and shell usage dating to this period discovered. They would've been attached to fishing spear prongs, which would mean that multi-pronged fishing spears occurred at this time. The evidence of spear-throwing is suggested by an excavated shell in Balmoral Beach.
- c 500 CE – Likely large tsunami.

== 18th–19th centuries ==
=== 1770s–1790s ===
- 1770 – Lieutenant (later Captain) James Cook, in command of HMS Endeavour, sights the east coast of Australia and lands at Kurnell.
- 1779 – Joseph Banks gives evidence supporting a colony in Botany Bay.
- c 1780 – Likely massive flood on Hawkesbury River.
- 1783 – James Matra proposes colony in New South Wales.
- 1786 – British government decides to found convict settlement in Botany Bay.
- 1787 – First Fleet of eleven vessels under the command of Captain Arthur Phillip leaves Portsmouth.
- 1788
  - Phillip arrives in Botany Bay but moves site of settlement to Sydney Cove.
  - French vessels under the command of Lapérouse land in Botany Bay.
  - Parramatta founded.
  - Convict Henry Kable successfully sues ship's master for stealing his goods on voyage.
  - Punitive expedition after killing of two convicts by aboriginal people fails to find any culprits.
- 1789
  - Smallpox epidemic kills many of indigenous population.
  - Rose Hill Packet built for service on Parramatta River.
  - Six marines hanged for theft from government stores.
  - Farquhar's comedy 'The Recruiting Officer' performed by convicts.
- 1790
  - Phillip speared by Willemering at Manly Cove.
  - Second Fleet arrives with many deaths and convicts in poor condition.
  - William Dawes creates word-list of Dharug language with the help of Patyegarang.
  - Glebe granted as endowment to Church of England.
- 1791
  - Successful convict farmer James Ruse granted land at Rosehill.
  - Convict station established at Old Toongabbie.
  - Mary Bryant and other convicts escape by open boat to Timor.
  - Third Fleet arrives with provisions.
  - Third Fleet ship Britannia leaves for whaling expedition in the South Seas.
  - First convicts arrive from Ireland in the Queen.

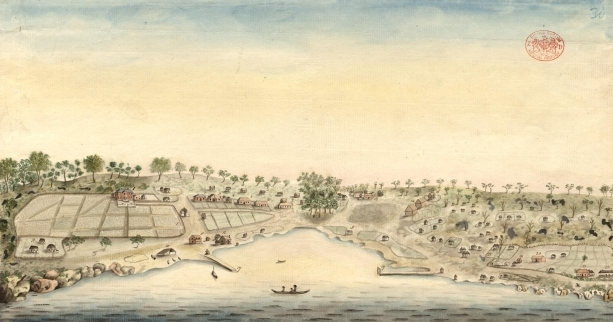
Sydney Cove, Port Jackson, 1792

- 1792
  - Burial Ground established.
  - Visit of first trading vessels, the Philadelphia and Hope from America.
  - Phillip returns to England, accompanied by Bennelong and Yemmerrawanne.
- 1793
  - John and Elizabeth Macarthur begin building Elizabeth Farm at Rosehill.
  - Visit of Malaspina's Spanish exploratory expedition.
  - First free settlers arrive on the Bellona.
  - First church built.
  - Watkin Tench's Complete Account of the Settlement at Port Jackson published in London.
- 1794 – Maurice Margarot and four other radical political prisoners arrive.
- 1795
  - Bennelong returns from visit to England.
  - Descendants of cattle that had escaped in 1788 found at Cowpastures (Camden).
  - First printing press used to print government orders.
  - Complex legal case Boston v Laycock over shooting of pig by soldier.
  - Initiation ceremony of 15 indigenous youths at Farm Cove.
- 1796
  - White population: 4,000.
  - Political prisoner Thomas Muir escapes on American ship.
  - Bushranger "Black Caesar" shot and killed.
  - First theatre opens.
- 1797
  - Prospect, a western Sydney suburb, became the boundary between colonists and indigenous Australians. Hostility grew where a state of guerrilla warfare existed between indigenous people and the settler communities at Prospect and Parramatta. The aboriginal people were led by their leader, Pemulwuy, a member of the Bidjigal tribe who occupied the land.
  - First windmill.
  - First merino sheep brought from Cape of Good Hope by Captain Waterhouse.
  - Three survivors of Sydney Cove shipwreck reach Sydney after walking from Gippsland.
- 1798
  - First church burns down.
  - David Collins' An Account of the English Colony in New South Wales published in London.
  - Arrival of London Missionary Society preacher Rowland Hassall.
- 1799 – Five men convicted of murdering two aboriginals on the Hawkesbury but not punished.

=== 1800s–1840s ===
- 1800 – Hundreds of rebels of the Irish Rebellion of 1798 arrive as convicts.
- 1801
  - Female Orphan School first state charitable institution.
  - Lieutenant Governor Paterson wounded by John Macarthur in a duel.
- 1802
  - Visit of Baudin's French exploratory expedition.
  - Matthew Flinders departs Sydney on Investigator for circumnavigation of Australia, accompanied by Bungaree.
  - Pemulwuy shot and killed.
- 1803
  - Sydney Gazette newspaper begins publication.
  - First Vaucluse House built.
  - First officially-permitted Catholic masses said by Fr Dixon.
  - Masonic meeting broken up by order of the Governor.
  - American brig Union stores thousands of sealskins from Bass Strait with Simeon Lord.
- 1804
  - Castle Hill convict rebellion
  - Fort Phillip construction begins.
- 1805 – first whaling vessels based in Sydney.
- 1806 – Visit of Russian ship Neva en route to Alaska.
- 1807
  - Surveyor James Meehan draws detailed plan of Sydney Town.
  - Merchant Robert Campbell establishes first shipbuilding yard at Kirribilli.
- 1808 – New South Wales Corps depose Governor Bligh in Rum Rebellion.
- 1810
  - Macquarie Street laid out and Hyde Park reserved as a public park.
  - First post office opened, with Isaac Nichols postmaster.
  - Liverpool founded.
  - Maori chief Ruatara stays with Rev Samuel Marsden at Parramatta and prepares mission to New Zealand.
- 1811
  - Castle Hill Lunatic Asylum established.
  - Mary Reibey inherits and expands the business interests of her husband Thomas Reibey.
- 1813
  - Crossing of Blue Mountains opens route from Sydney to west.
  - Benevolent Society founded as charity for general purposes.
  - First steam engine imported.
  - Middles punched out of 40,000 Spanish dollars to create Holey dollar local coinage.
- 1814 – Native Institution established for education of black children.
- 1815 – Sydney connected to inland by Cox's Road over Blue Mountains.
- 1816
  - Macquarie revives annual Aboriginal Feast Day at Parramatta.
  - Royal Botanic Gardens open.
  - Sydney Hospital built.
  - Cadmans Cottage built at The Rocks.
- 1817
  - Bank of New South Wales established.
  - Construction of Fort Macquarie begun on Bennelong Point.
  - Surveyor John Oxley departs to explore the Lachlan River.
- 1818
  - Macquarie Lighthouse operational.
  - Arrival of John Shying, first known Chinese immigrant.

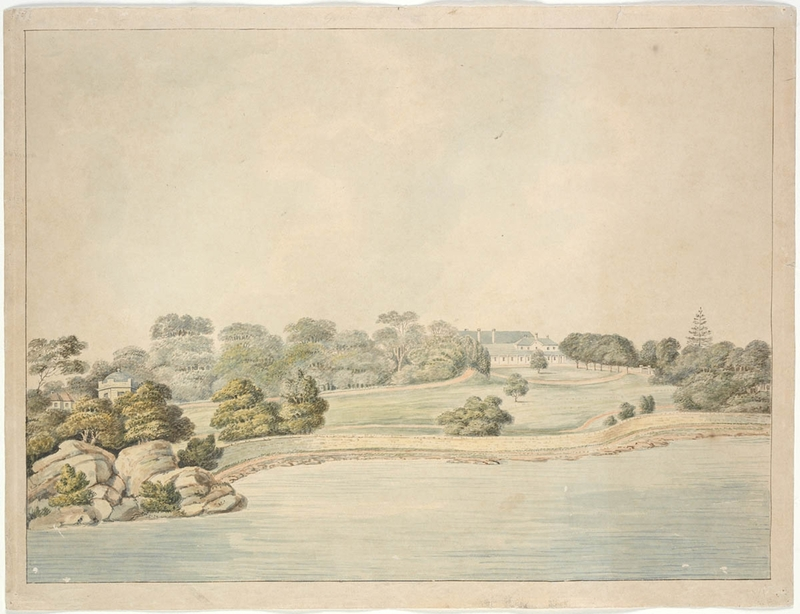
Government House, 1819

- 1819
  - Hyde Park Barracks built.
  - Design of St James' Church commissioned from Francis Greenway.
  - Visit of de Freycinet's French exploratory expedition.
  - Land in north-western Sydney granted to aboriginal guides Colebee and Nurragingy.
  - 14-year-old aboriginal girl at Parramatta wins first prize in school examinations.
- 1820
  - Devonshire Street Cemetery established.
  - Deaths from flu epidemic.
- 1821
  - First Catholic church, St Mary's, begins construction.
  - Philosophical Society (later Royal Society of New South Wales) founded.
- 1822
  - Royal Agricultural Society of New South Wales founded.
  - Bank of New South Wales cashier Francis Williams convicted of embezzling £12,000.
- 1823 – First Sydney Royal Easter Show held.
- 1824
  - St James' Church consecrated.
  - Supreme Court of New South Wales proclaimed.
  - The Australian newspaper begins publication.
- 1825
  - New South Wales Legislative Council established in Sydney.
  - First known musical composition in Australia, Reichenberg's 'Australian Quadrilles'.
- 1826
  - Scots Church opened.
  - Eliza Darling establishes the first friendly society, the Female Friendly Society of the Town of Sydney.
  - Sydney Australian Subscription Library and Reading Room founded.
  - Sydney Dispensary established to provide medicine and outpatient care for the poor.
  - Visiting painter Augustus Earle paints portraits of leading citizens.
- 1827 – Australian Museum established.
- 1828
  - Thieves steal some £14,000 in Bank of Australia robbery.
  - North Head begins use as quarantine station.
- 1831
  - Weekly Sydney Herald newspaper begins publication.
  - The King's School, Parramatta founded.
  - Land granted to indigenous woman Maria Lock and her white husband.
- 1833
  - Sydney Mechanics' School of Arts founded.
  - Randwick Racecourse opened.
  - Theatre Royal opened.
  - Eight killed in explosion of brig Ann Jameson at King's Wharf.
- 1834
  - John Bede Polding appointed first Catholic bishop.
  - Markets consolidated at Paddy's Markets site at Haymarket.
  - Australian Union Benefit Society formed to support workers in distress.
  - Commercial Banking Company of Sydney founded.
- 1835 – Tooth & Co build Kent Brewery at Blackwattle Creek.
- 1836
  - Visit of Charles Darwin on voyage of the Beagle.
  - First Anglican bishop installed.
  - Great North Road completed connecting Sydney to Hunter Valley.
- 1837
  - Government House and Botany-Sydney aqueduct built.
  - James Mudie's The Felonry of New South Wales defames many leading citizens.
- 1838
  - Seven perpetrators of Myall Creek Massacre hanged.
  - David Jones (shop) in business.
  - Australian Club founded.
- 1839
  - Penal establishment for secondary punishment opened on Cockatoo Island.
  - First ice imported to Sydney from Boston.
- 1840
  - Farmers & Co. in business.
  - Visiting Maori chiefs' attempted sale of South Island to W.C. Wentworth and associates prevented by Governor Gipps.
- 1841
  - Caroline Chisholm establishes Female Immigrants Home
  - Darlinghurst Gaol in operation.
  - Scarlet fever epidemic.
  - First photograph in Australia.
  - Construction begun of Victoria Barracks in Paddington.
  - Street gas lights turned on, supplied by Australian Gas Light Company
- 1842
  - City incorporated; city council elected.
  - Area of city: 11.65 square kilometres (approximate).
  - Catholic Archdiocese of Sydney established.
- 1843
  - Depth of depression with failures of Bank of Australia and Sydney Banking Company.
  - Riot during campaign for first elected Legislative Council.
- 1844 – Hero of Waterloo Hotel built.
- 1846
  - Hero's welcome to Ludwig Leichhardt on his return from overland expedition to Port Essington.
  - First Australian meat canning plant opened.
  - Opening of Pitt Street Congregational Church.
- 1847
  - Isaac Nathan's opera Don John of Austria produced at Royal Victoria Theatre.
  - Herman Melville's Omoo describes a whaling voyage from Sydney.
- 1848
  - House of the Good Shepherd and Sydney Female Refuge founded as women's refuges.
  - First shipment of Irish Famine orphans arrives on the Earl Grey.
- 1849
  - Arrival of Hashemy, last convict transport.
  - Foundation of AMP Society to provide life insurance.

=== 1850s–1890s ===
- 1850
  - University of Sydney established.
  - Freeman's Journal newspaper begins publication.
- 1851 – Parliamentarian Stuart Donaldson and explorer Thomas Mitchell fight last known duel in Australia.
- 1852 – University of Sydney appoints first professors, John Woolley, Morris Birkbeck Pell and John Smith.
- 1853 – Manly ferry services begin.
- 1854
  - Sydney Cricket Ground opens.
  - St Paul's College, University of Sydney founded.
- 1855
  - First New South Wales Government Railways train operates from Redfern to Parramatta.
  - Sydney Mint established in General Hospital and Dispensary building.
  - Stonemasons first workers to win Eight-hour day.
  - Lola Montez shocks theatregoers with her "libertinish and indelicate" Spider Dance.
- 1856
  - First Pyrmont Bridge built.
  - St Philip's Church rebuilt.
  - Anglican Moore Theological College opens.
  - First Australian medical school established at Sydney University.
- 1857
  - Wreck of Dunbar at The Gap kills 121.
  - Fitzroy Dock dry dock completed on Cockatoo Island Dockyard.
  - St Vincent's Hospital founded by Sisters of Charity.
  - St John's College, Sydney University founded.
  - Construction of Fort Denison completed.
  - Australian Museum opened to the public.
- 1858
  - Sydney Observatory built.
  - Royal Navy takes over Garden Island for use as naval base.

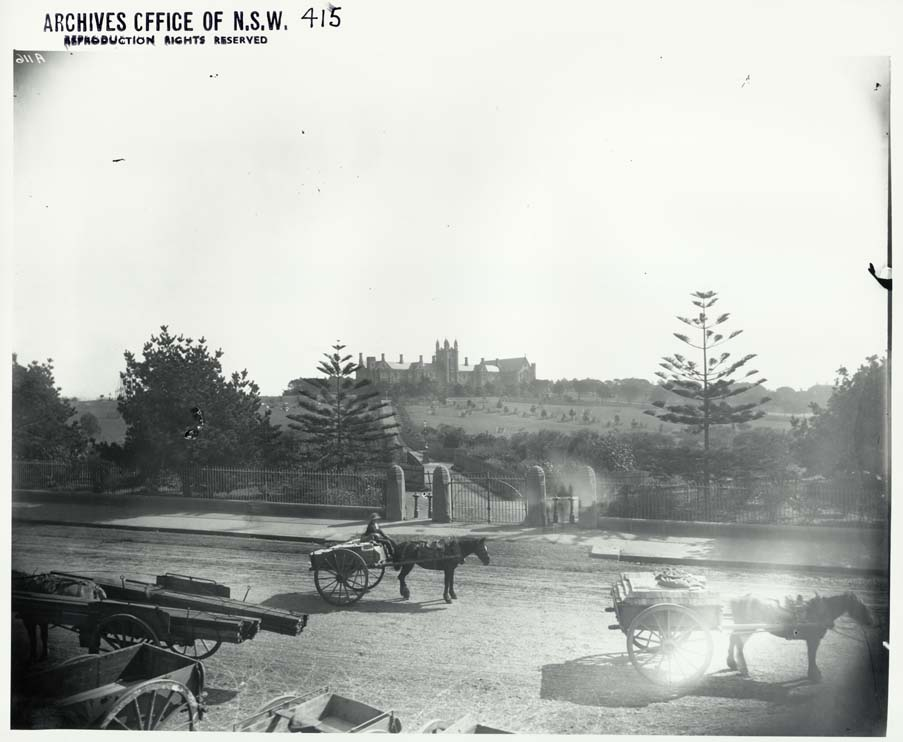
Sydney University, c. 1880s

- 1859
  - Parliamentary electoral districts of East Sydney and West Sydney created.
  - Great Hall of the University of Sydney completed.
- 1861
  - Thomas Sutcliffe Mort establishes freezing works at Darling Harbour.
  - First horse-drawn trams run from Circular Quay to Redfern station.
  - Population: 95,000 city and suburbs.
- 1863 – Imprisoned bushranger Captain Thunderbolt escapes from Cockatoo Island by swimming.
- 1865 – St Mary's Cathedral destroyed by fire.
- 1866 – Bridge St building demolished in nitroglycerine explosion.
- 1867
  - Measles epidemic kills some 750, mostly young children.
  - Massive flood on Hawkesbury River.
  - First burials at Rookwood Cemetery.
- 1868
  - Belmore Park opens.
  - St Andrew's Cathedral consecrated.
  - Prince Alfred survives shooting by Irishman Henry O'Farrell at Clontarf.
  - First mention of Granny Smith apple, discovered by Maria Smith at Ryde.
- 1869 – State Government purchases Subscription Library and opens Sydney Free Public Library.
- 1871
  - Trades & Labor Council formed as peak union body.
  - Sydney Exchange and Academy of Art founded.
- 1872
  - Sydney connected to Europe by telegraph.
  - Fish market opens in Woolloomooloo.
  - Tooheys opens Darling Brewery.
- 1874
  - Art Gallery of New South Wales opened.
  - Foundling Institution established.
- 1875 – Holtermann panorama of Sydney Harbour photographed.
- 1877 – Waverley Cemetery established near city.
- 1878
  - Great Synagogue completed.
  - Speakers' Corner established in The Domain.
  - Robinson-Finlay wedding takes place.
- 1879
  - St Aloysius College, Jesuit school established.
  - Sydney Riot of 1879 over unpopular umpiring decision.
  - Sydney International Exhibition held; Garden Palace built.
  - Art Gallery of New South Wales opens.
  - Opera House opens in King Street.
  - Dymocks bookseller in business.
  - New South Wales Zoological Society founded.
  - Royal National Park established south of the city.
  - Joseph Conrad's first visit to Sydney.
- 1880
  - Jesuit school Saint Ignatius' College, Riverview established on Lane Cove River.
  - Children's Hospital opened.
  - Wirth's Circus begun.
- 1881
  - Population: 237,300 city and suburbs.
  - First telephone exchange.
  - Coast Hospital (later Prince Henry) for infectious diseases opened at Little Bay.
- 1882
  - Sydney Showground opens.
  - St Mary's Cathedral consecrated.
  - Royal Prince Alfred Hospital opened.
  - Garden Palace destroyed by fire.
  - Construction of Eveleigh Railway Workshops begun.
  - Sydney Technical College formed, incorporating Sydney Mechanics' School of Arts.
  - Royal Easter Show moves to Moore Park site.
  - The Australian Golf Club established.
- 1883
  - Main Southern railway line completed to Albury.
  - Sydney High School and Sydney Wharf Labourers Union established.
  - Sydney University Medical School founded by Professor Anderson Stuart.
  - Sydney Cricket Ground hosts third and fourth tests in first test tour in Australia.
- 1885 – Doyles Restaurant at Watsons Bay founded.
- 1886 – Angus & Robertson bookselling partnership formed.
- 1887
  - Four hanged in Mount Rennie rape case.
  - Parramatta Girls Home opened.
- 1888
  - Arrival of Afghan from Hong Kong sparks anti-Chinese demonstrations.
  - Centennial Park established to mark centenary of Sydney.
  - Louisa Lawson founds The Dawn feminist magazine.
  - Charles Conder's paintings Coogee Bay and Departure of the Orient - Circular Quay.
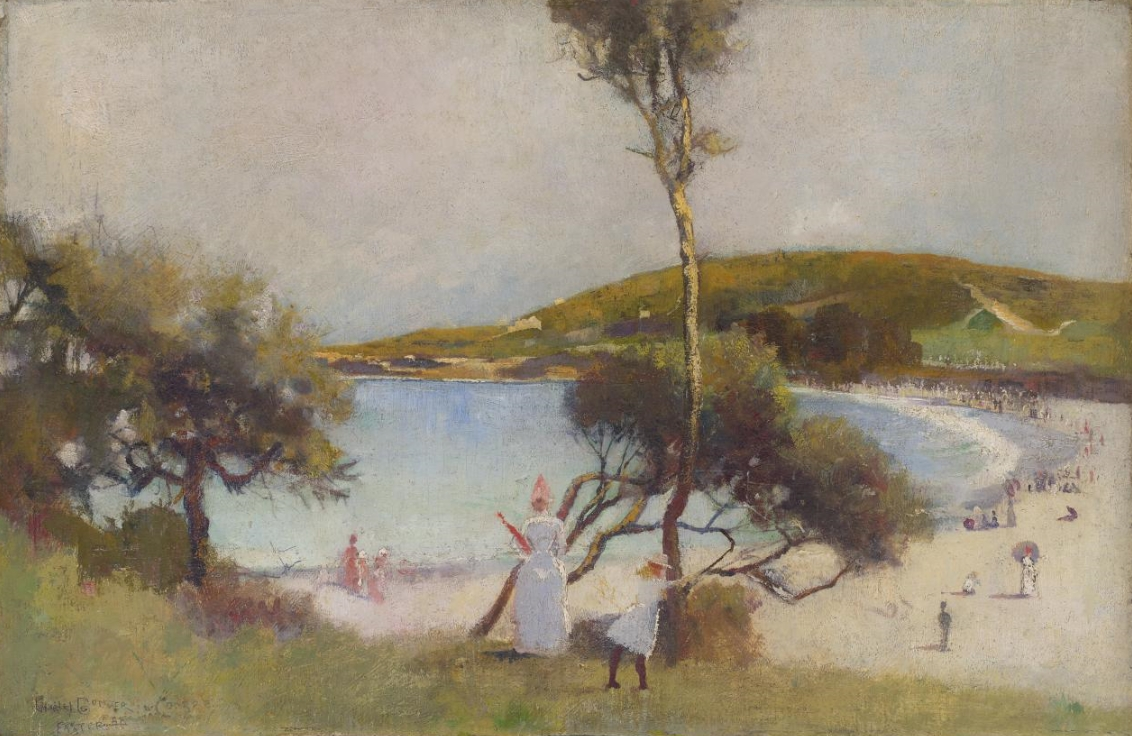
    Conder, Coogee Bay, 1888
  - Intercolonial Rabbit Commission meets to consider schemes for eradication of rabbits.
- 1889
  - Sydney Town Hall built.
  - Women's College and Sydney Church of England Grammar School founded.
  - St Patrick's Seminary, Manly, founded.
- 1890
  - Sydney Town Hall Grand Organ installed.
  - Julian Ashton Art School established.
  - Hotel Metropole opens.
  - Charles Kerry photography studio in business.
- 1891
  - General Post Office built.
  - Population: 399,270 city and suburbs.
  - Australia Hotel opens with visit of Sarah Bernhardt.
  - Constitutional Convention meets to begin framing constitution for federated Australia.
  - Womanhood Suffrage League of New South Wales founded, with Mary Windeyer president.
- 1892
  - Strand Arcade opens.
  - GPS (Great Public Schools) Association founded.
  - Henry Lawson's short story The Drover's Wife published in The Bulletin.
  - The Women's College, University of Sydney opens.
  - Suspension Bridge connects Northbridge and Cammeray.
- 1893
  - Technological Museum opens.
  - Royal Sydney Golf Club founded.
  - Baby farmers John and Sarah Makin convicted of murder of infants.
  - Arthur Streeton's painting Railway Station, Redfern.
  - Socialists led by William Lane set out to found New Australia settlement in Paraguay.
  - Women's Hospital, later Crown Street Women's Hospital, opened.

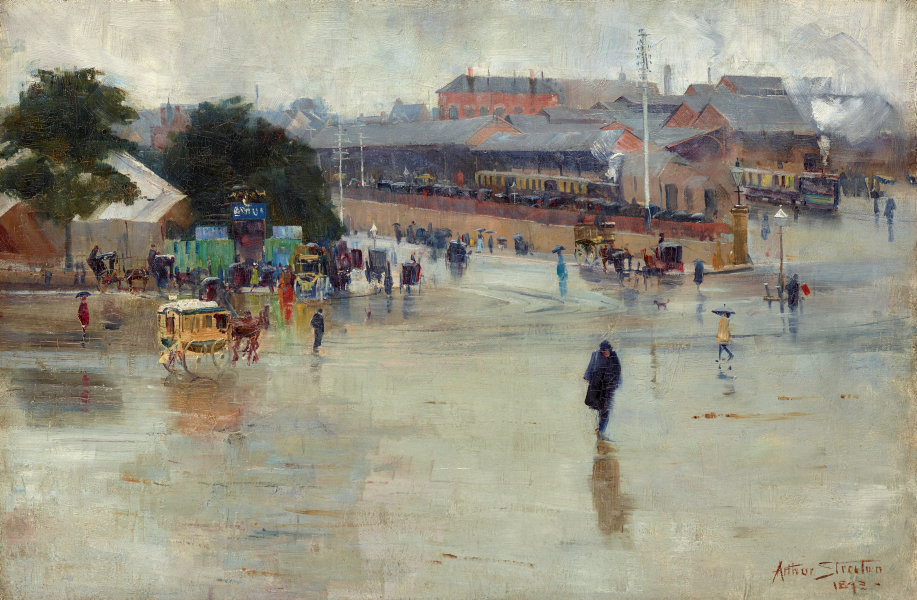
Streeton, Railway Station, Redfern, 1893

- 1894 - Seven Little Australians published.
- 1895
  - City Tattersalls Club formed.
  - Mark Twain visits Sydney on lecture tour.
- 1896
  - Australis motor car manufactured in Leichhardt.
  - First Australian film shown at first cinema.
- 1897
  - Balmain Colliery dug.
  - Sacred Heart Monastery, Kensington, constructed.
  - Cardinal Moran stands unsuccessfully for election to the Australasian Federal Convention.
- 1898
  - Queen Victoria Building constructed.
  - Sze Yup Temple built in Glebe.
  - Clyde Engineering formed to manufacture railway rolling stock.
- 1899 – Ultimo Power Station commissioned.
- 1900
  - Sydney Harbour Trust active.
  - Bubonic plague outbreak.
  - NSW troops embark for Boer War.

== 20th century ==
=== 1900s–1940s ===
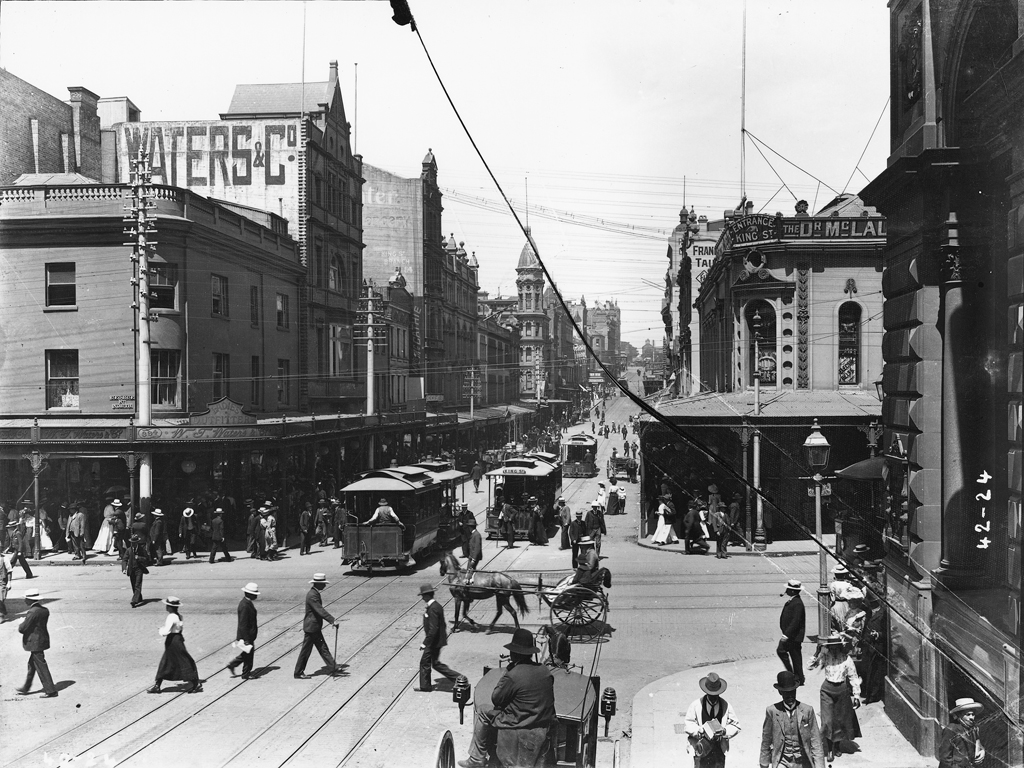
King Street, circa 1900

- 1901
  - Inauguration of Commonwealth of Australia at Centennial Park, with Sydney lawyer Edmund Barton first prime minister.
  - Royal Australian Historical Society founded.
  - Population: 112,137 city; 369,693 suburbs.
  - Fire destroys Anthony Hordern & Sons' department store with five lives lost.
  - Haberfield subdivided to create garden suburb of Federation houses.
- 1902
  - Second Pyrmont Bridge built.
  - Fort Macquarie Tram Depot opened on Bennelong Point.
  - Sayers, Allport & Potter market successful phosphorus-based rabbit poison.
- 1903
  - Glebe Island Bridge and Her Majesty's Theatre rebuilt.
  - Bronte Surf Club became the first Surf Club as noted in Bronte by S. Vesper in his history of the Bronte Surf Club
  - Death of prominent Chinese businessman Quong Tart after bashing.
- 1904 – Electric street lighting installed.
- 1905
  - Anthony Hordern & Sons's Palace Emporium in business.
  - Dental Hospital founded.
- 1906
  - Central railway station opens.
  - Bondi Surf Bathers' Life Saving Club active.
- 1907
  - 20 October: Bathing costume protests.
  - Wylie's Baths built at Coogee.
  - Melbourne–Sydney telephone begins operating.
  - Bequest of David Scott Mitchell leaves major collection of Australiana to State Library of New South Wales.
- 1908
  - Camperdown becomes part of city.
  - New South Wales Rugby League Premiership formed
  - Burns-Johnson world heavyweight boxing title fight at Sydney Stadium.
  - Visit of American Great White Fleet.
- 1909
  - City of Sydney Library established.
  - Mark Foy's emporium opened on Liverpool Street.
  - First powered flight in Australia at Victoria Park Racecourse, Zetland.
  - Death of Saint Mary MacKillop at North Sydney.
  - First section of Long Bay Jail opened.
- 1910
  - The Sun newspaper begins publication.
  - Escapologist Harry Houdini demonstrates his skills.
- 1912
  - Natural living advocate William Chidley declared insane and confined in Callan Park Hospital.
  - Fanny Durack and Mina Wylie win 100m gold and silver in the first Olympics to have women's swimming.
  - Construction begins of garden suburb of public housing at Daceyville.
  - Culwulla Chambers built.
- 1913
  - Eileen O'Connor founds Our Lady's Nurses for the Poor to assist the sick poor at home.
  - Arrival of first Royal Australian Navy fleet.
  - Sydney quarantined in smallpox epidemic.
  - Eryldene, Gordon house and garden designed for E.G. Waterhouse by William Hardy Wilson.
- 1914
  - Anzacs train at Kensington Racecourse before being sent to Gallipoli.
  - Maurice Guillaux makes first airmail flight from Melbourne to Sydney.
- 1915
  - Sydney Conservatorium of Music established.
  - Crowds welcome Cooee March from Gilgandra with 263 recruits.
- 1916
  - First Anzac Day commemoration in Sydney.
  - 14 February: Liverpool riot of 1916.
  - Trial and conviction of the Sydney Twelve radicals.
  - Taronga Zoo opens.
  - Art in Australia magazine begins publication.
  - Middleweight boxer Les Darcy wins Australian heavyweight championship at Sydney Stadium.
  - James Hardie begins asbestos manufacture at Camellia.
  - Sydney Camera Circle formed to promote a Pictorialist style of photography.
  - First issue of School Magazine.
- 1917
  - General strike begins with walkouts of Sydney railway workers.
  - J.G. Park photography studio in business (approximate date).
  - White Bay Power Station operational.
- 1918
  - Crowds celebrate Armistice Day.
  - Publication of Snugglepot and Cuddlepie introduces May Gibbs' cartoon gumnut babies.
  - Norman Lindsay's children's book The Magic Pudding published.
- 1919
  - Some 3,500 die in Spanish Flu epidemic.
  - Elioth Gruner's Spring Frost painted at Emu Plains.
- 1920
  - Communist Party of Australia formed.
  - 18 February: World's "first" swimsuit competition (beauty contest) held in Sydney.
  - Hurlstone Park Choral Society formed.
  - The Home luxury magazine first published.
  - Transgender Eugene Falleni convicted of murder of wife.
  - Enthusiastic welcome for visit of Prince of Wales.
- 1921
  - First award of Archibald Prize for portraiture.
  - Bronte Splashers Winter Swimming Club was formed becoming the first Winter Swimming Club in Australia.
  - First appearance of cartoonist Jimmy Bancks' character Ginger Meggs.
  - Supreme Court case Partridge v. Dwyer ignites sectarian conflict over escaped nun Sister Liguori.
- 1922
  - State funeral for Henry Lawson.
  - D.H. Lawrence's brief visit results in novel Kangaroo set in extreme Right and Left politics in Sydney.
  - HMAS Adelaide completed at Cockatoo Island Dockyard after seven years building.
- 1923 – ABC radio station 2BL begins broadcasting.
- 1924
  - Sydney Airport begins operating.
  - Hordern Pavilion built.
  - Architects Walter Burley Griffin and Marion Mahony Griffin move to Castlecrag and begin designing the suburb.
  - Star Amphitheatre completed at Balmoral Beach.
  - HMAS Australia scuttled off Sydney Heads under terms of disarmament treaty.
  - First Spit Bridge opened.
  - Knox Grammar School established.
  - Woolworths opens first variety store.
- 1925
  - Poet Christopher Brennan dismissed by Sydney University for divorce and drunkenness.
  - First commercial radio station, 2UE, begins broadcasting.
- 1926
  - Electric train services begin
  - Radio station 2GB begins broadcasting.
  - Anna Pavlova dances at Her Majesty's Theatre.
  - Patent for Weet-Bix cereal registered.
- 1927
  - Sydney Cenotaph erected.
  - Hyde Park completed.
  - Greycliffe ferry disaster on Sydney Harbour kills 40.
  - Darrell Lea chocolate shop established in Haymarket.
  - David Jones' Elizabeth Street department store opens.
  - Aeroplane Jelly launched.

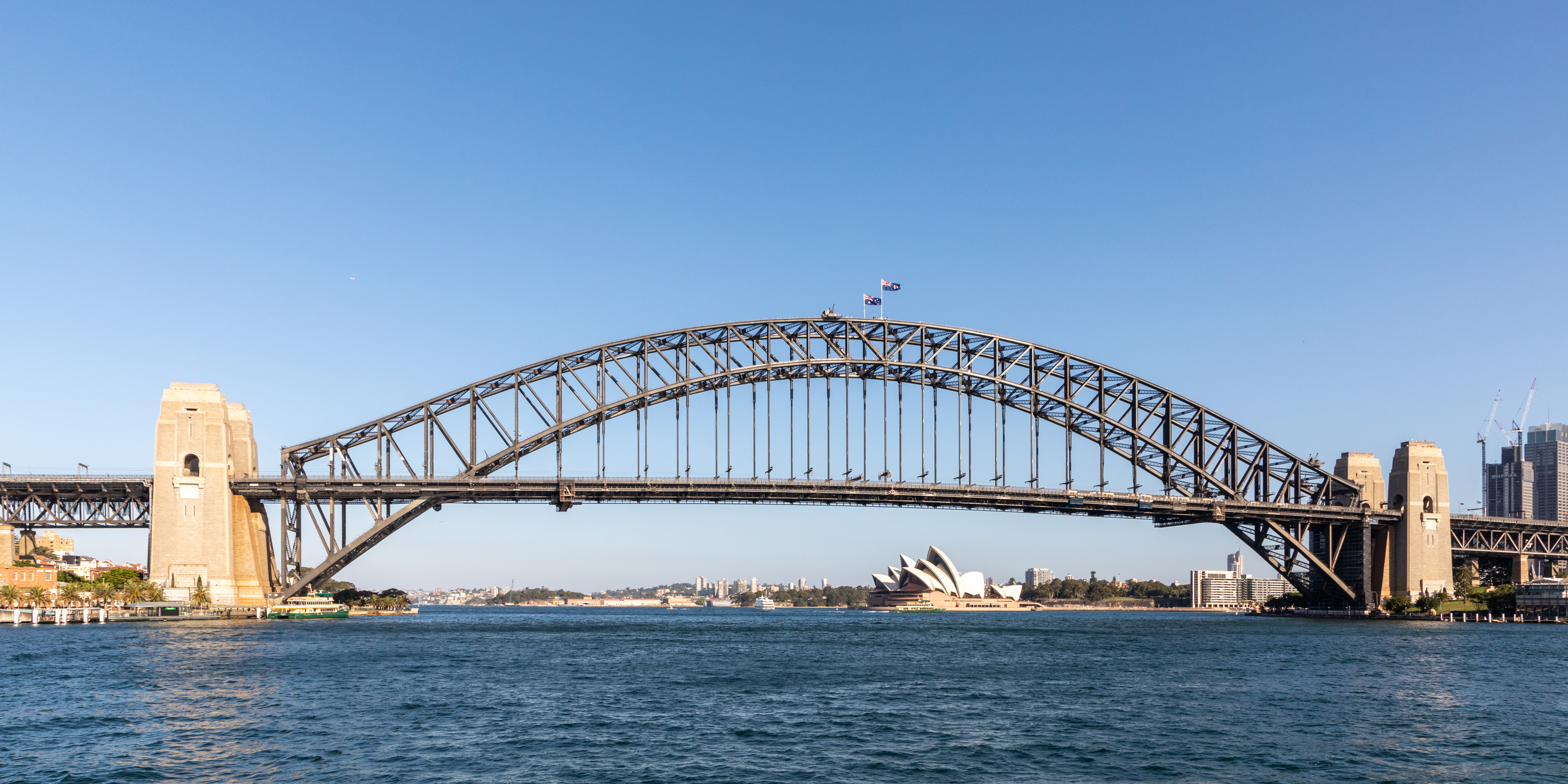
Sydney Harbour Bridge

- 1928
  - Capitol Theatre opens.
  - Coogee Pleasure Pier opens.
  - Bondi Surf Pavilion and Balmoral Bathers Pavilion built.
  - Government Savings Bank Building constructed.
  - Catholic Eucharistic Congress witnessed by 500,000.
  - Charles Kingsford Smith leaves for first Trans-Tasman flight.
  - Alexander MacRae's line of swimwear renamed Speedos.
  - Sydney University Quad jacaranda planted.

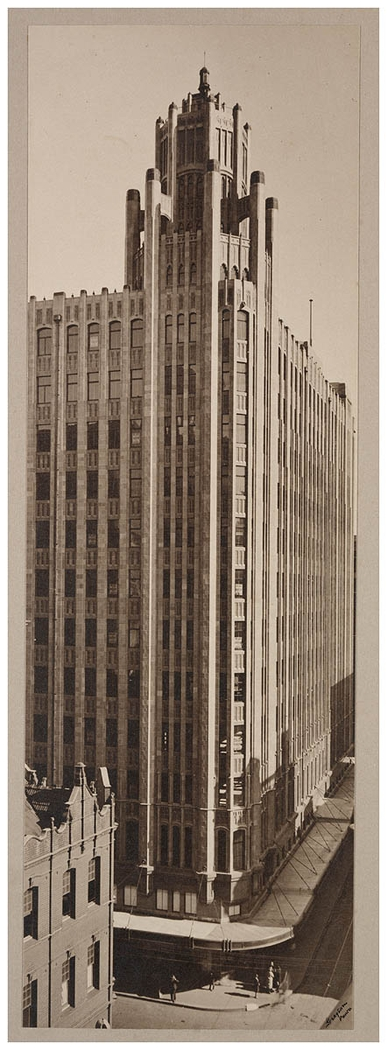
The Grace Building, 1930, by Max Dupain

- 1929
  - State Theatre opens.
  - Sun Building constructed.
  - Bunnerong Power Station begins operation.
  - Bondi Icebergs winter swimming club founded.
- 1930
  - Modern Art Centre opens.
  - Grace Building constructed in Art Deco style.
  - Doris Fitton founds Independent Theatre.
  - Grace Cossington Smith's painting The Bridge in Curve shows the Harbour Bridge under construction.
- 1931 – Collapse of Government Savings Bank and amalgamation with Commonwealth Bank.

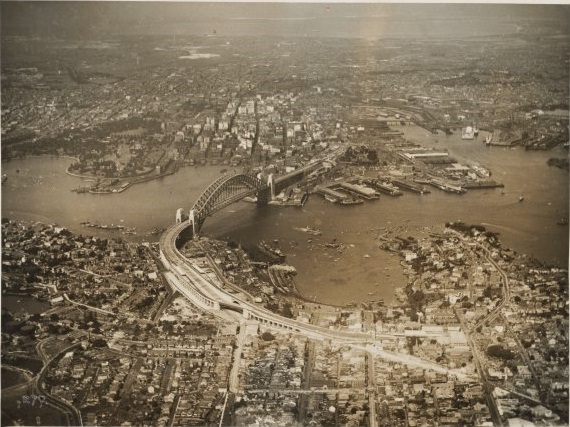
Aerial view of Sydney, 1932

- 1932
  - Sydney Harbour Bridge opened, with horseman de Groot cutting ribbon ahead of the premier.
  - Town Hall railway station, and Wynyard railway station opened.
  - Governor Sir Philip Game dismisses Premier Jack Lang in constitutional crisis.
  - Bodyline bowling of Harold Larwood secures England victory in first test match.
  - Dymocks building constructed.
  - Archibald Fountain unveiled.
  - Arthur Stace begins decades of chalking "Eternity" on Sydney pavements.
  - Edward Hallstrom's refrigerator factory opens in Willoughby.
  - Newly-formed Australian Broadcasting Commission establishes National Broadcasting Symphony Orchestra (later Sydney Symphony Orchestra).
- 1933
  - Australian Women's Weekly begins publication.
  - Population: city and suburbs; 1,235,267
  - Australia's first traffic lights installed at corner of Market and Kent streets.
- 1934
  - Anzac Memorial, Hyde Park opened.
  - Communist Egon Kisch given test in Scottish Gaelic in attempt to exclude him from Australia.
  - Christina Stead's novel Seven Poor Men of Sydney portrays struggles of poor intellectuals.
  - Comedian Roy Rene's only film, Strike Me Lucky made by Ken G. Hall.
- 1935
  - Luna Park and Astoria Theatre open.
  - Shark Arm case when human arm found in captured shark.
  - Shark Menace Advisory Committee recommends meshing.
  - Olive Cotton's photograph Tea cup ballet.
- 1936
  - First Black and White charity ball.
  - Ford car factory opened at Homebush West.
  - Harry's Cafe de Wheels pie cart opens in Woolloomooloo.
  - Arrival of new HMAS Sydney.

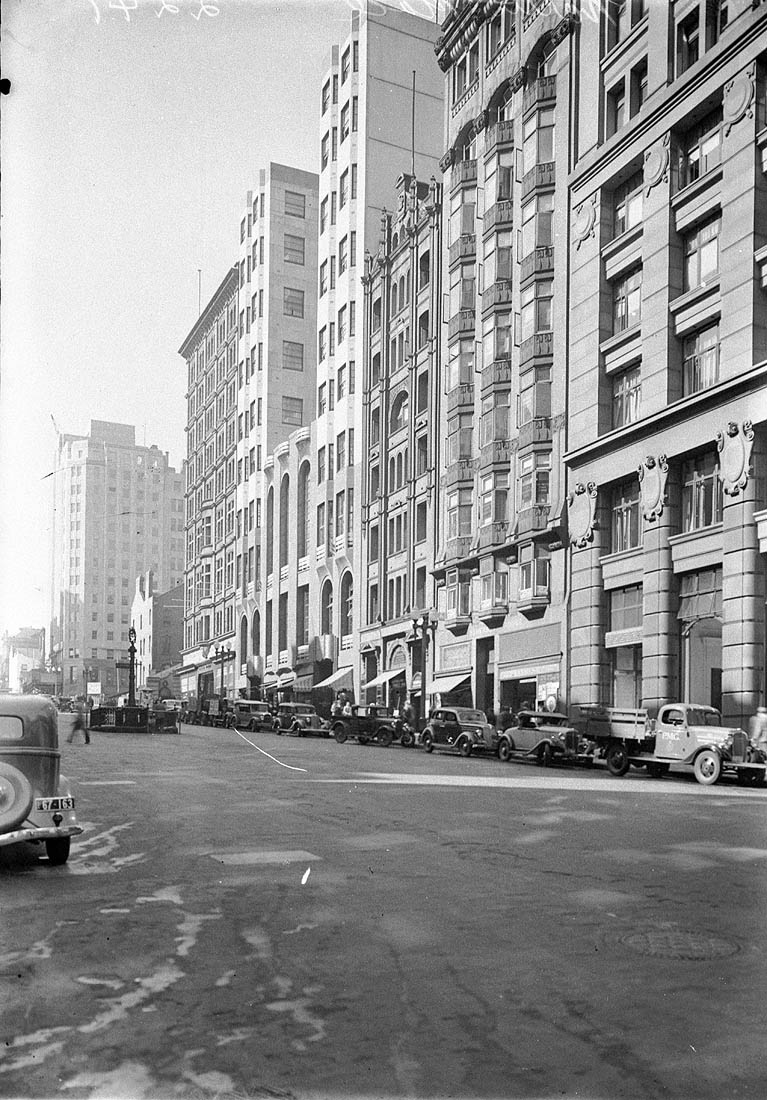
Martin Place in 1939, prior to pedestrianisation

- 1937 – Enoch Powell appointed Professor of Greek at Sydney University.
- 1938
  - City hosts 1938 British Empire Games.
  - Five dead when large waves wash away sandbar at Bondi Beach.
  - Aboriginal Day of Mourning protests sesquicentennial celebrations of settlement.
  - 19 die in capsize of ferry Rodney.
  - Rose Bay Flying Boat Base opened with flights to London.
  - Ken G. Hall's comedy Dad and Dave Come to Town includes feature film debut of Peter Finch.
- 1939
  - AWA Tower built.
  - Last execution in NSW.
  - Prime Minister Joseph Lyons dies at St Vincent's Hospital.
- 1940
  - St James Theatre opens.
  - Charles Chauvel movie Forty Thousand Horsemen filmed at Bondi and Cronulla.
  - Dunera arrives after horror voyage with "enemy aliens".
  - Christina Stead's novel The Man Who Loved Children describes growing up with a controlling paterfamilias.
- 1941
  - Daily Mirror newspaper begins publication.
  - Queen Mary departs Sydney with troops for Middle East.
  - Eleanor Dark's novel The Timeless Land set in the first years of Sydney.

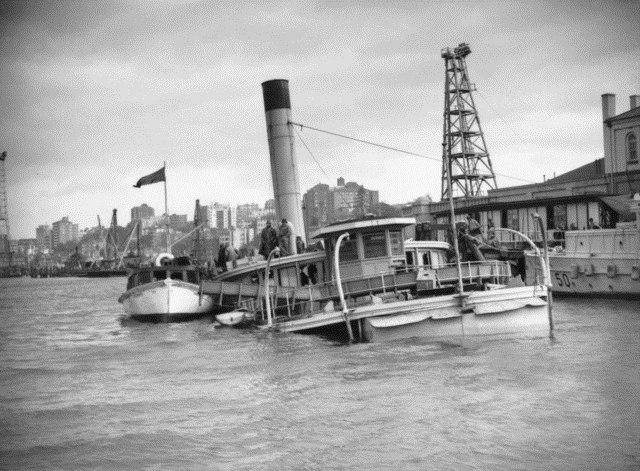
HMAS Kuttabul after sinking by Japanese midget submarine, Garden Island, 1942

- 1942
  - Anti-submarine defences built.
  - May–June: Attack on Sydney Harbour by Japanese midget submarines.
  - Bankstown Bunker constructed as Air Defence HQ.
  - Yaralla Military Hospital (later Concord Repatriation General Hospital) opened.
- 1943
  - Sydney University philosopher John Anderson censured by State Parliament for anti-religious views.
  - William Dobell's Archibald Prize-winning portrait Mr Joshua Smith subject of legal case as to whether it was a caricature.
  - Kylie Tennant's novel Ride on Stranger describes a country girl making her way in the city.
- 1944 – Sali Herman's painting McElhone Stairs wins Wynne Prize.
- 1945
  - Celebration of VJ Day.
  - First Sydney to Hobart Yacht Race.
- 1946
  - Sydney Symphony Orchestra active.
  - Norman Gilroy named first Australian-born cardinal.
  - Criminal Darcy Dugan makes first of several escapes from custody.
- 1947
  - Population: 95,852 city; 1,484,434 metro.
  - Qantas operates Sydney-London Kangaroo Route.
  - New Year's Day hailstorm causes massive damage.
  - Don Bradman scores 100th first-class century.
  - Australian School of Pacific Administration moved to Middle Head.
  - Russell Drysdale's painting Sofala wins Wynne Prize.
- 1948
  - Visit of Laurence Olivier and Vivien Leigh.
  - Communist-Catholic debate attracts 30,000 to Sydney Stadium.
  - Ruth Park's novel The Harp in the South describes an inner-Sydney poor Irish community.
  - Qantas connects Australia to Africa via air for first time via Sydney-Johannesburg Wallaby Route.
- 1949
  - Alexandria, Darlington, Erskineville, Glebe, Newtown, Paddington, Redfern, and Waterloo become part of the city.
  - University of Technology (later University of New South Wales) established.
  - Australia's first computer, CSIRAC, constructed at CSIRO Radiophysics Lab.
  - Security forces seize documents in raid on Communist headquarters Marx House.
  - Broadcast of first of 5795 episodes of radio serial Blue Hills.
  - Villawood Migrant Hostel built.
  - Ingrid Bergman stars in Alfred Hitchcock's film Under Capricorn, set in 1830s Sydney.

=== 1950s–1990s ===
- 1950
  - Nuffield Australia opens car assembly plant at Zetland.
  - June Dally-Watkins opens school of deportment and etiquette.
- 1951 - Cumberland Plan adopted for green belt around city.
- 1952
  - Berala train crash kills 10.
  - Camellia expert Professor E.G. Waterhouse founds Camellia Research Society.
- 1953
  - Sydney Sun-Herald newspaper in publication.
  - Racehorse trainer Tommy J. Smith wins the first of 33 consecutive Sydney Trainers' Premierships.

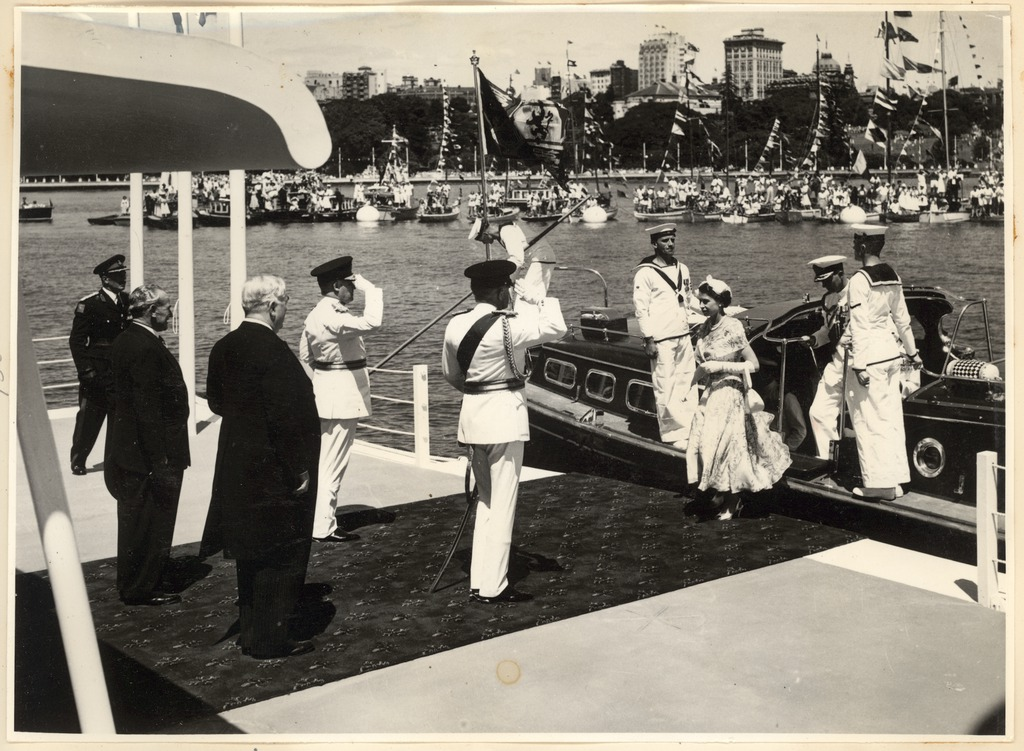
Queen Elizabeth II alighting at Farm Cove, 1954

  - Rugby league commentator Frank Hyde broadcasts the first of 33 consecutive grand finals on 2SM.
  - Fictionalised autobiography Caddie, A Sydney Barmaid published.
  - Caroline Grills convicted of murdering relatives with thallium rat poison.
  - 100,000 attend Fr Peyton's rosary crusade at Sydney Cricket Ground.

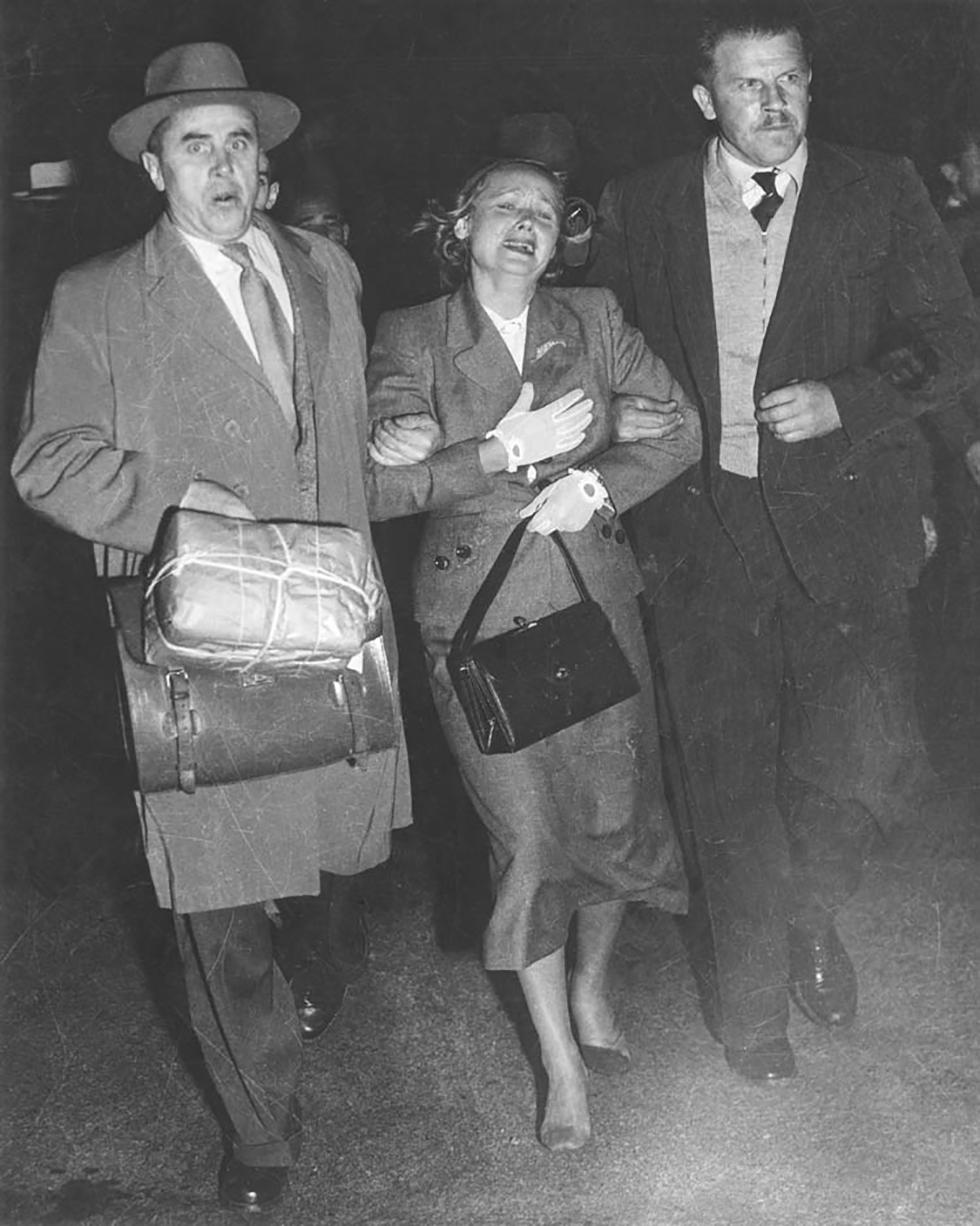
Mrs Petrov at Sydney Airport, 1954

- 1954
  - Queen Elizabeth II makes first royal visit.
  - Dramatic photo of Mrs Petrov being dragged across tarmac of Sydney Airport sparks Petrov Affair.
  - Model Shirley Beiger acquitted of murder after shooting her lover dead outside Chequers nightclub.
  - Sydney Film Festival begins.
- 1955 – Public outcry against Rosaleen Norton, the "Witch of Kings Cross", for alleged Satanism.
- 1956
  - ATN Channel 7 television begins broadcasting.
  - Circular Quay railway station opened marking the completion of the City Circle.
  - St George rugby league club wins the first of 11 consecutive premierships.
  - Kurnell Refinery built.
  - Kirribilli House begins use as Prime Ministerial residence.
  - Anti-communist cultural magazine Quadrant founded.
  - James Dibble begins 27 years as ABC TV newsreader.
  - Conservatorium director Eugene Goossens resigns after pornography found at Airport.
  - First drive-in theatres opened.
- 1957
  - Jørn Utzon wins competition to design Sydney Opera House.
  - John Laws joins 2UE, beginning 60-year Sydney radio career.
- 1958
  - Cahill Expressway completed.
  - National Institute of Dramatic Art founded.
  - First Australian nuclear reactor opened at Lucas Heights.
  - Cyril Pearl's Wild Men of Sydney describes corruption in colonial times.
  - Betty Archdale becomes headmistress of Abbotsleigh girls' school, known for progressive reforms.
  - Professor Harry Messel founds International Science School.
- 1959
  - Joe Cahill dies in office after seven years as premier.
  - 150,000 attend evangelist Billy Graham's last appearance at Sydney Showground.
  - D'Arcy Niland's novel The Big Smoke tells stories of early twentieth-century Sydney.
  - Ice skating rink built at Prince Alfred Park.
  - Broughton Knox becomes principal of Moore Theological College.
- 1960
  - Murder of Graeme Thorne solved with scientific methods.
  - Overseas Passenger Terminal opens at Circular Quay.
  - Completion of Warragamba Dam ensures reliable water supply to Sydney.
  - Paul Robeson sings Ol' Man River to construction workers on Opera House site.
  - Clontarf beach washed away by Chilean tsunami.
- 1961
  - Last Trams in Sydney operate.
  - Dr William McBride reveals thalidomide is causing birth defects.
  - Demolition of Subiaco colonial home, Rydalmere, prompts moves to preserve architectural heritage.
  - Tania Verstak first immigrant Miss Australia.
  - Dedication of Baha'i Temple.
  - El Alamein Fountain opened at Kings Cross.
- 1962
  - First performance by Australian Ballet at Her Majesty's Theatre.
  - Shows by visiting comedian Lenny Bruce cancelled for obscenity.
  - AMP Building opens, then the tallest building in Australia.
  - Blues Point Tower completed.
- 1963
  - Mysterious deaths of Dr Bogle and Mrs Chandler.
  - Lifeline telephone counselling service launched by Rev Alan Walker.
  - Harry Triguboff founds Meriton property development company.
  - Last fatal shark attack in Sydney Harbour.
- 1964
  - Gladesville Bridge opened.
  - Macquarie University established.
  - Dawn Fraser returns from Tokyo Olympics with third consecutive women's 100m freestyle gold medal.
  - Rev Ted Noffs establishes Wayside Chapel near Kings Cross.
  - The Beatles perform at Sydney Stadium.
  - The Mavis Bramston Show brings satirical sketch comedy to Australian TV.
  - First of Charmian Clift's five years of essays in Sydney Morning Herald.
  - James Hardie Industries ignores warning on the extreme health risks of asbestos manufacture.
  - Paddington Society founded.
  - Colourful academic Fred May appointed foundation professor of Italian at Sydney University.
- 1965
  - Joan Sutherland and Luciano Pavarotti in J.C. Williamson's opera tour.
  - Controversy over failure of Sydney University to appoint Dr Knopfelmacher to post in political philosophy.
  - Roselands Shopping Centre opens.
  - Wanda Beach Murders.
  - Sydney Maritime Museum founded.
  - Hydrofoil ferry service to Manly begins.
- 1966
  - Attempted assassination of Arthur Calwell, Federal opposition leader, in Mosman.
  - Protestors disrupt motorcade of President Lyndon Johnson in Oxford Street.
  - Significant changes to Opera House design after Jørn Utzon's resignation.
  - Movie comedy They're a Weird Mob portrays tensions between Italian immigrants and Irish-Australians.
  - Children's TV series Play School begins broadcasting.
  - Wentworth Hotel opens.
  - Bee Gees achieve first major hit

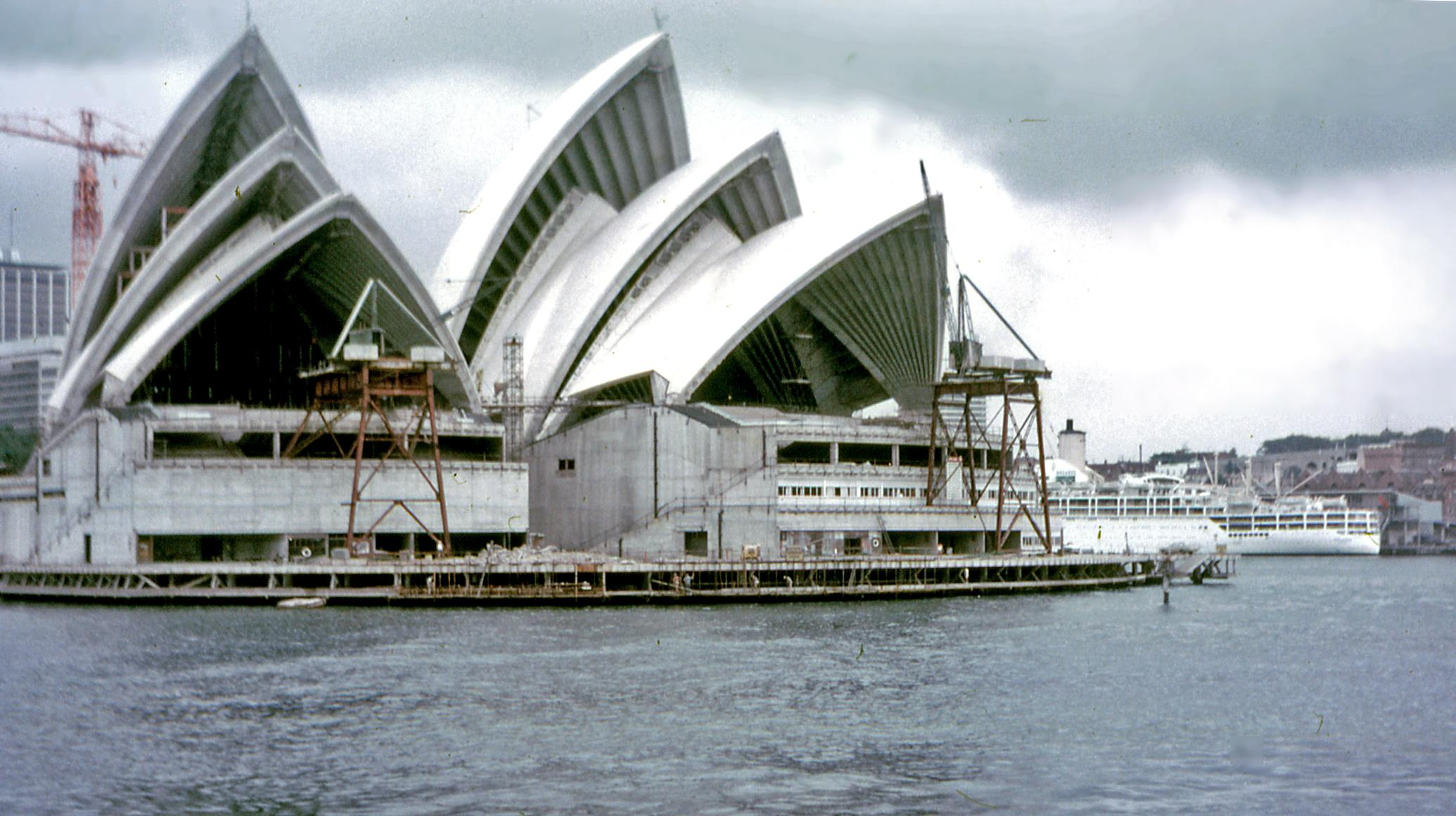
Sydney Opera House under construction, 1968

- 1967
  - Australia Square hi-rise built.
  - Thomas Keneally wins Miles Franklin Award for novel Bring Larks and Heroes set in early Sydney.
  - Bourbon & Beefsteak pub opens in Kings Cross, catering to American servicemen on leave from Vietnam.
  - HMAS Platypus, Neutral Bay commissioned as base for Oberon-class submarines.
- 1968
  - South Sydney Municipal Council created.
  - Sydney Region Outline Plan envisages dispersed city centres.
  - Sister city relationship established with San Francisco, USA.
  - Skippy the Bush Kangaroo TV series begins broadcast.
  - Glenfield siege ends with wedding of gunman and hostage.
  - D.M. Armstrong's A Materialist Theory of the Mind defends philosophical theory that the mind is identical with the brain.
  - Entrepreneur Dick Smith founds Dick Smith Car Radios, later Dick Smith Electronics.
  - Leonie Kramer appointed Professor of Australian Literature at Sydney University.
- 1969
  - Large-scale artist Christo creates Wrapped Coast by wrapping part of Little Bay in plastic.
  - Crash landing of Boeing 707 after bird strike on takeoff, no injuries.
- 1970
  - Pope Paul VI makes first papal visit.
  - Nimrod Theatre founded.
  - Aboriginal Legal Service founded in Redfern.
  - Many arrests in Vietnam Moratorium demonstrations.
- 1971
  - City of Sydney Strategic Plan created.
  - Green Bans led by Jack Mundey begin with campaign to save Kellys Bush in Hunters Hill.
  - Protests against Springbok rugby union tour.
  - First City2Surf fun run and race.
  - First McDonald's in Australia opens at Yagoona.
  - Qantas pays $500,000 ransom in bomb hoax.
  - Ken Rosewall and Margaret Court champions in the last Australia Open tennis tournament held at White City.
- 1972
  - Construction workers take over the Sydney Opera House.
  - Aboriginal Medical Service established in Redfern.
  - Gough Whitlam's Blacktown speech launches successful Labor It's Time federal election campaign.
  - Soap opera Number 96 stretches boundaries of what can be shown on TV.
  - Cleo magazine for young women founded with Ita Buttrose as editor.
  - Fashion designer Carla Zampatti opens first boutique in Surry Hills.
  - Rabbi Apple begins 33-year term as Senior Rabbi of Great Synagogue.

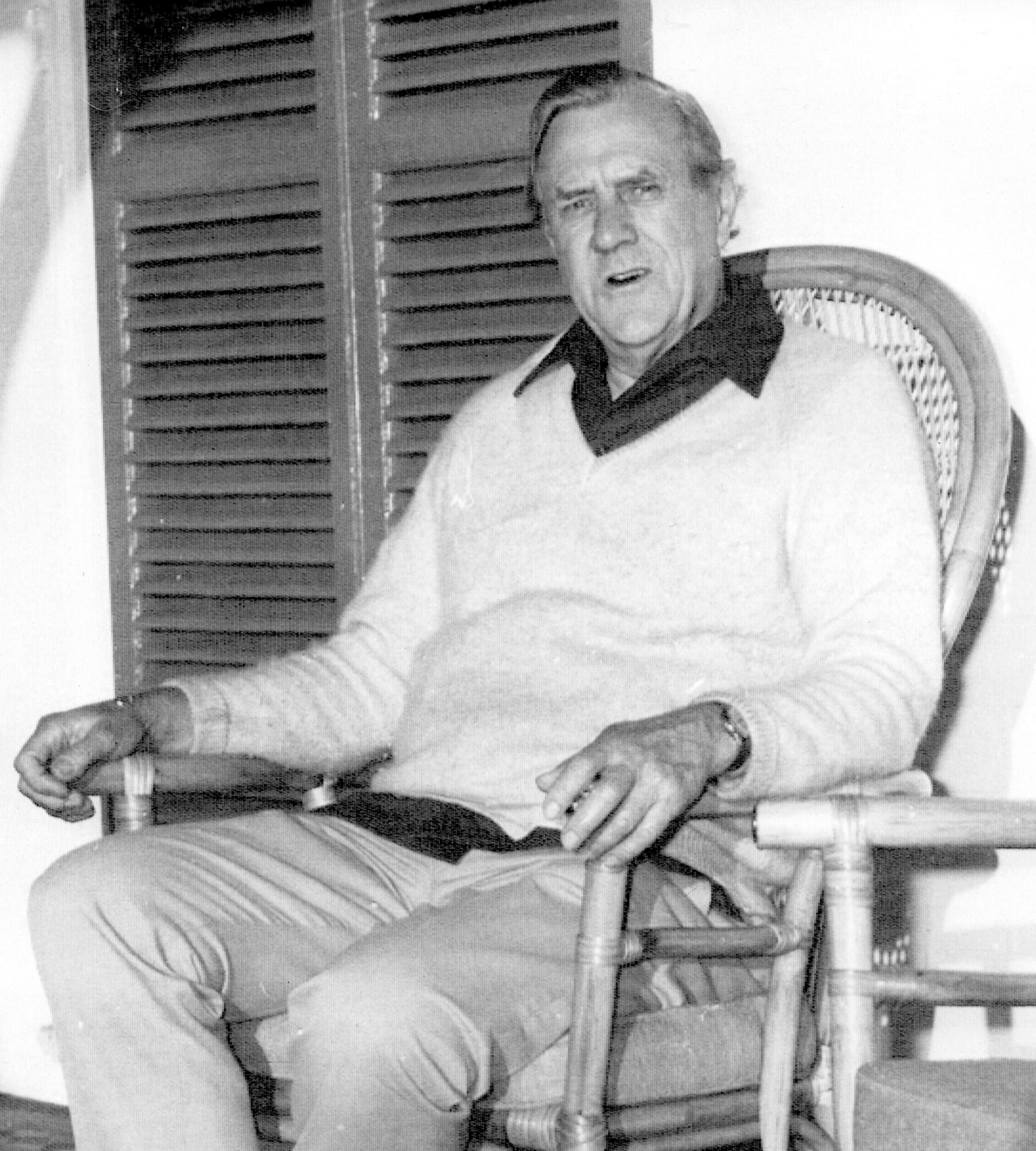
Patrick White, 1973

- 1973
  - Sydney Opera House opens.
  - Patrick White awarded Nobel Prize for Literature.
  - Political disturbances in University of Sydney Philosophy Department lead to strike and split in department.
  - Greek Orthodox Cathedral of the Annunciation of Our Lady completed in Redfern.
- 1974
  - Elsie Women's Refuge established in Glebe.
  - Federal government buys Glebe Estate to begin urban renewal.
  - Bob Hawke and Frank Sinatra negotiate deal for Sinatra to continue controversial tour.
- 1975
  - Disappearance of activist Juanita Nielsen.
  - Savoy Hotel fire kills 15.
  - Preterm abortion clinic burns down in suspicious circumstances.
  - Development begins of Sydney Coordinated Adaptive Traffic System.
  - Triple J radio begins broadcasting.
  - Radio Station 2EA (later SBS Radio) begins broadcasts in multiple languages.
  - Premiere of TV comedy The Norman Gunston show with Garry McDonald.
  - Gough Whitlam meets Iraqi agents at Blues Point Tower seeking money for electioneering.
  - Old Sydney Town theme park opened at Somersby.
- 1976
  - Sydney New Year's Eve firework display launched.
  - Black comedy Don's Party filmed in Westleigh.
  - Graeme Murphy appointed artistic director of Dance Company of NSW, later Sydney Dance Company.
  - Gas supply converted to natural gas with opening of Moomba to Sydney Pipeline.

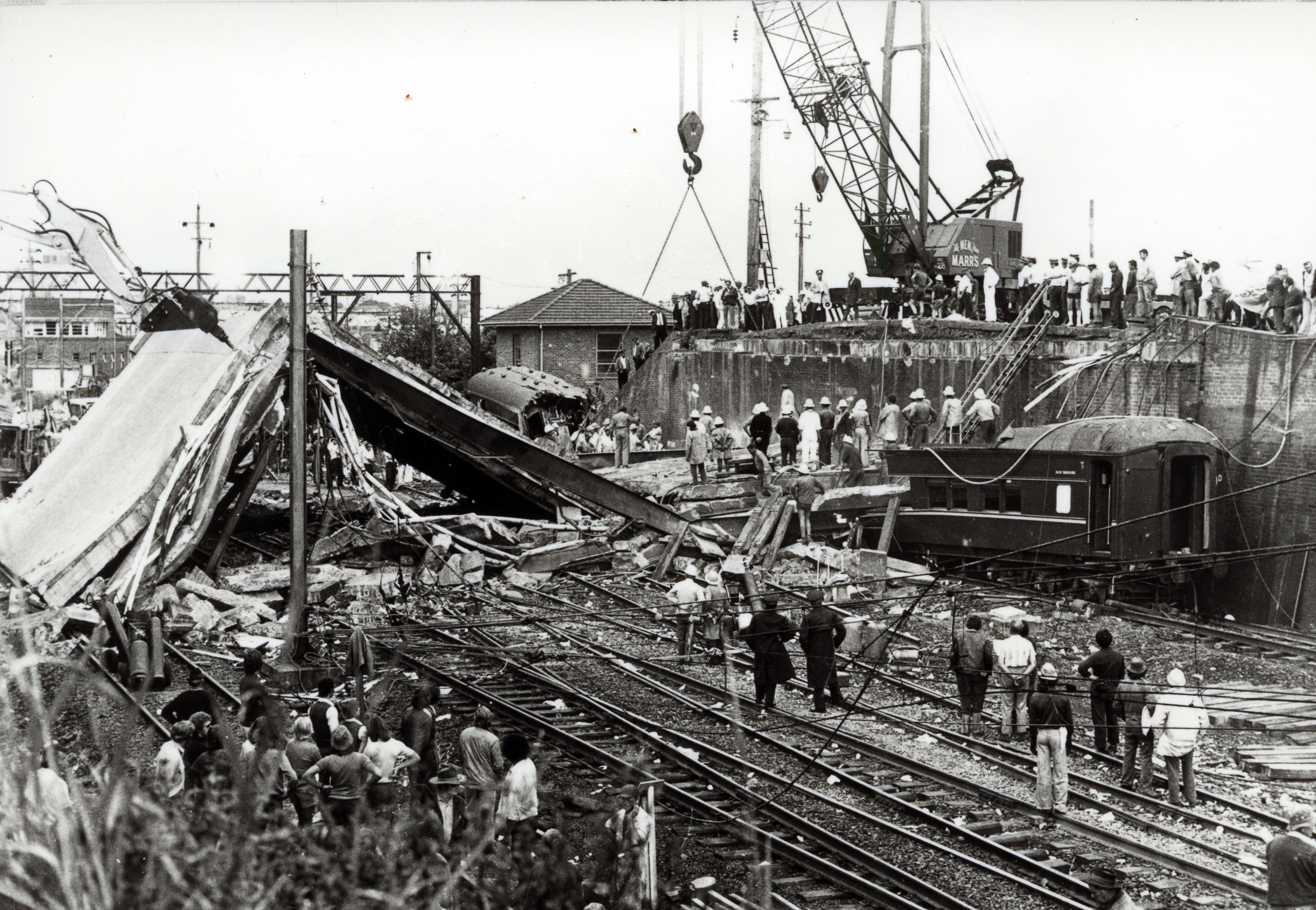
Aftermath of Granville train disaster, 1977

- 1977
  - Granville train disaster kills 84.
  - Sydney Festival begins.
  - Harry Seidler-designed MLC Centre opens.
  - First Sydney International Piano Competition.
  - Lakemba Mosque completed.
- 1978
  - First Gay and Lesbian Mardi Gras.
  - Painter Brett Whiteley wins Archibald, Wynne and Sulman prizes in same year.
  - Hilton bombing kills three.
  - Marriage of former Sydney schoolgirl Marie-Christine von Reibnitz to Prince Michael of Kent.
  - Westmead Hospital opens.
  - TV miniseries Against the Wind depicts life in early Sydney.
- 1979
  - 9 June: 1979 Sydney Ghost Train fire.
  - Martin Place pedestrianised.
  - Eastern Suburbs railway line opens.
  - Sydney Theatre Company founded.
  - Teen novel Puberty Blues describes surfing culture in Sutherland Shire.
  - Racing identity and crime figure George Freeman survives being shot in the neck.
  - Racehorse Kingston Town wins first of 21 Sydney races from 21 starts.
  - Liliana Gasinskaya defects from Russian cruise ship in red bikini.
- 1980
  - Collapse of Nugan Hand Bank.
  - Publication of the first of Peter Corris's Cliff Hardy detective novels.
  - Clive James's memoir Unreliable Memoirs describes his Sydney childhood and youth.
  - CPAP machine for sleep apnea developed by Colin Sullivan.
  - SBS Television begins broadcasts in multiple languages from studios in Milsons Point.
  - Crash at Sydney Airport kills 13.
  - Family Court judge David Opas shot dead outside his Woollahra home.
  - Assassination of Turkish consul general.
  - Bill Collins' Golden Years of Hollywood begins national broadcast on Network 10.
- 1981
  - Sydney Tower opened.
  - Drug dealer Warren Lanfranchi shot dead by policeman Roger Rogerson in Chippendale.
  - Croatian Six convicted of conspiracy to bomb several targets.
  - Judy Davis/Bryan Brown movie Winter of Our Dreams portrays inner-Sydney life.
  - First of 1088 episodes of TV series A Country Practice.
  - Reverend Fred Nile begins 42 years in Legislative Council defending conservative Christian values.
- 1982
  - Bombings of Israeli Consulate and Hakoah Club.
  - First Harvey Norman retail store opened at Auburn.
- 1983
  - Hillsong Church established in Baulkham Hills.
  - Glenn Murcutt-designed Berowra Waters Inn restaurant opened by Gay and Tony Bilson.
  - Golfer Jack Newton loses right arm after walking into propeller at Sydney Airport.
  - Joan Sutherland and Luciano Pavarotti perform at Opera House benefit concert.
  - Movie Careful, He Might Hear You adapts Sumner Locke Elliott's novel of Sydney childhood.
  - Nicole Kidman begins film career in Bush Christmas and BMX Bandits.
  - Carols in the Domain Christmas concert begun.
  - Sydney Entertainment Centre opened in Haymarket.
- 1984
  - Victor Chang performs Australia's first successful heart transplant at St Vincent's Hospital.
  - Judge's wife killed in Family Court of Australia attacks.
  - Seven killed in Milperra massacre bikie shootout.
  - Bank robbery and hostage crisis in George Street.
  - Elton John married.
- 1985
  - Parliament House rebuilt.
  - Granny Smith Festival begins in Eastwood.
  - Financial services firm Hill Samuel becomes Macquarie Bank.
  - Chief Stipendiary Magistrate Murray Farquhar jailed for conspiracy to pervert the course of justice.
  - Suicide of Dr Harry Bailey while under investigation for deep sleep therapy at Chelmsford Hospital.
  - Wonderland theme park opened at Eastern Creek.
- 1986
  - Body of Sallie-Anne Huckstepp found in Centennial Park.
  - Anita Cobby murder.
  - Disappearance and killing of nine-year-old Samantha Knight.
  - Playing Beatie Bow movie dramatises Ruth Park's young adult novel of time travel in inner Sydney.
- 1987
  - University of Sydney's Research Institute for Asia and the Pacific established.
  - Sydney Kings men's basketball team formed.
- 1988
  - Australian Bicentenary events staged including First Fleet Re-enactment on Sydney Harbour.
  - Sydney Monorail opens
  - University of Technology, Sydney and University of Sydney's Centre for Peace and Conflict Studies established.
  - Sydney Convention & Exhibition Centre and Powerhouse Museum open.
  - Kay Cottee completes first women's solo non-stop unassisted circumnavigation of world.
  - Peter Sculthorpe's composition Kakadu completed.
  - Bicentennial Park, Homebush Bay and Mount Annan Botanic Garden open near city.
  - New South Wales Institute of Technology becomes University of Technology Sydney.
  - Murder of Scott Johnson, most prominent of gay gang murders.
  - Murder of Janine Balding.
- 1989
  - South Sydney City Council established.
  - Area of city: 6.19 square kilometres.
  - Neil Perry opens Rockpool restaurant.
  - Clean Up Sydney Harbour event initiates Ian Kiernan's Clean Up Australia campaign.
  - St James Ethics Centre (later The Ethics Centre) founded.
  - Three colleges federate to form University of Western Sydney (later Western Sydney University).
  - Bangarra Dance Theatre formed.

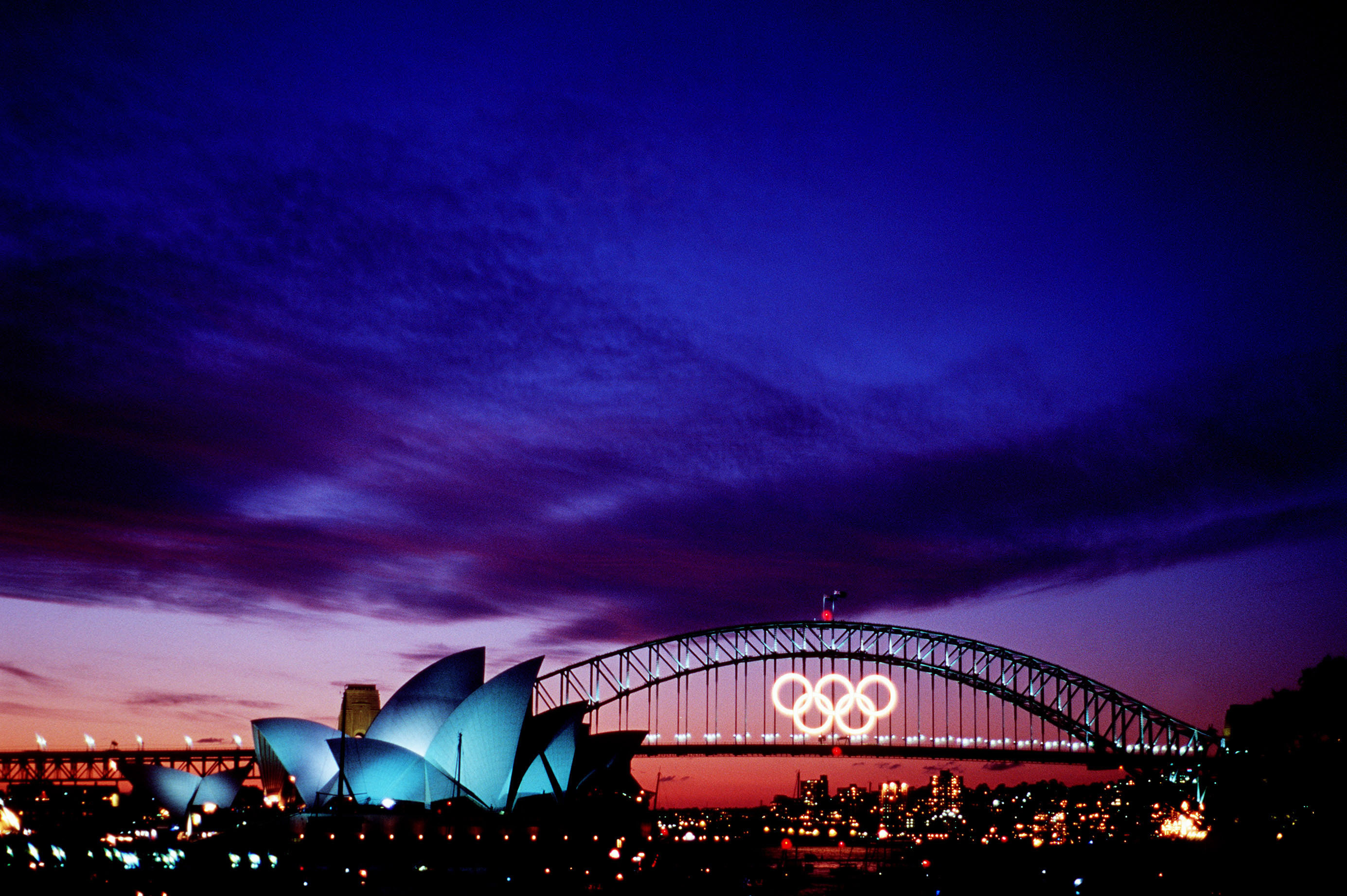
Sydney hosts the 2000 Summer Olympics.

- 1990
  - Sydney Children's Choir founded.
  - Bell Shakespeare company founded by actor John Bell.
  - Arrest of "Granny Killer" John Wayne Glover.
  - Media tycoon Kerry Packer revived after severe heart attack while playing polo at Warwick Farm.
  - Eureka Prizes for science inaugurated.
- 1991
  - Sydney Park established.
  - Heart surgeon Victor Chang shot dead in Mosman.
  - Eight dead in Strathfield massacre.
  - Arson attacks on five synagogues.
  - Museum of Contemporary Art opens in former Maritime Services Board building.
  - Fr Chris Riley founds Youth Off The Streets charity.
  - James Ruse Agricultural High School begins run of 32 consecutive years as top-ranked school in Higher School Certificate.
  - Colleges at Strathfield and North Sydney amalgamate with interstate colleges to form Australian Catholic University.
- 1992
  - Sydney Harbour Tunnel opened.
  - Sydney Jewish Museum opened.
  - Melina Marchetta's novel Looking for Alibrandi explores growing up in multicultural inner Sydney.
  - Paul Keating's Redfern Park Speech calls for new approaches to indigenous policy.
  - Fred Hollows Foundation set up to continue Fred Hollows' work on eye care in third world countries and remote Australia.
  - Legal action by some Sydney Anglicans fails to prevent ordination of women elsewhere.
  - First Big Day Out music festival.
- 1993
  - Sydney makes successful bid for 2000 Olympics.
  - South Sydney Heritage Society founded.
  - Offset Alpine fire raises suspicions of arson.
  - Liberal Presbyterian minister Peter Cameron convicted of heresy by church court.
- 1994
  - Sydney International Aquatic Centre opens.
  - Politician John Newman assassinated in Cabramatta.
  - January bushfires penetrate several suburbs.
  - Two blank shots fired at Prince Charles by David Kang at Darling Harbour.
  - Peter Coleman's Memoirs of a Slow Learner describes literary life of the 1950s.
  - Wedding scene of movie Muriel's Wedding filmed at St Mark's Church, Darling Point.
- 1995
  - Anzac Bridge opens.
  - Pope John Paul II beatifies Mary MacKillop at Randwick Racecourse.
  - Museum of Sydney opens.
  - Sydney's first legal casino opens.
  - 5T gang's domination of Cabramatta murders and drug trade declines with assassination of its leaders.
  - Death of Anna Wood from ecstasy tablet.
- 1996
  - Princess Diana attends Victor Chang Cardiac Research Institute Royal Ball.
  - CSIRO patents successful fast wifi technology developed by John O'Sullivan and other scientists.
  - New Prime Minister John Howard makes Kirribilli House rather than The Lodge in Canberra his principal residence.
  - Rats in the Ranks documentary portrays machinations in Leichhardt Council.
- 1997
  - Wood Royal Commission finds widespread corruption in NSW Police Force.
  - The Star, Sydney casino opens.
  - First Sydney Writers' Festival.
  - First Sculpture by the Sea outdoor sculpture exhibition at Bondi Beach.
  - Inner West Light Rail opens between Central and Wentworth Park, signalling the return of trams to Sydney after 36 years.
  - Suicide of singer Michael Hutchence at Double Bay.
- 1998
  - Sydney to Hobart Yacht race leaves Harbour despite storm warning, six yachtsmen killed.
  - Filming of The Matrix at Fox Studios and city locations.
  - March: State Hockey Centre opens.
  - BridgeClimb Sydney commences.
  - Water crisis over fears of contamination with pathogens.
  - Sydney Harbour Foreshore Authority formed to coordinate state-owned Harbour properties.

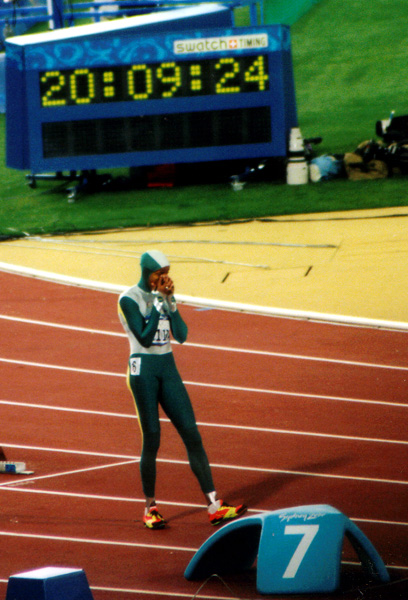
Cathy Freeman prepares for the 400m final at the Sydney Olympics

- 1999
  - 6 March: Stadium Australia opens.
  - 4 October: Sydney Super Dome opens.
  - 8 December: Sydney Olympic Park Tennis Centre opens.
  - City Recital Hall opens.
  - Lucy Dudko enables escape of prisoner from Silverwater Gaol in hijacked helicopter.
  - Hailstorm causes damage of around A$2.3bn.
  - John Birmingham's Leviathan explores the dark side of Sydney history.
- 2000
  - September: City hosts 2000 Summer Olympics and 2000 Summer Paralympics.
  - City of Sydney Historical Association founded.
  - Spires of St Mary's Cathedral completed.
  - Mary Donaldson meets her future husband, Prince Frederik of Denmark, at the Slip Inn.
  - Moulin Rouge! filmed at Fox Studios.
  - Wave of ethnically-motivated gang rapes in Western Sydney.

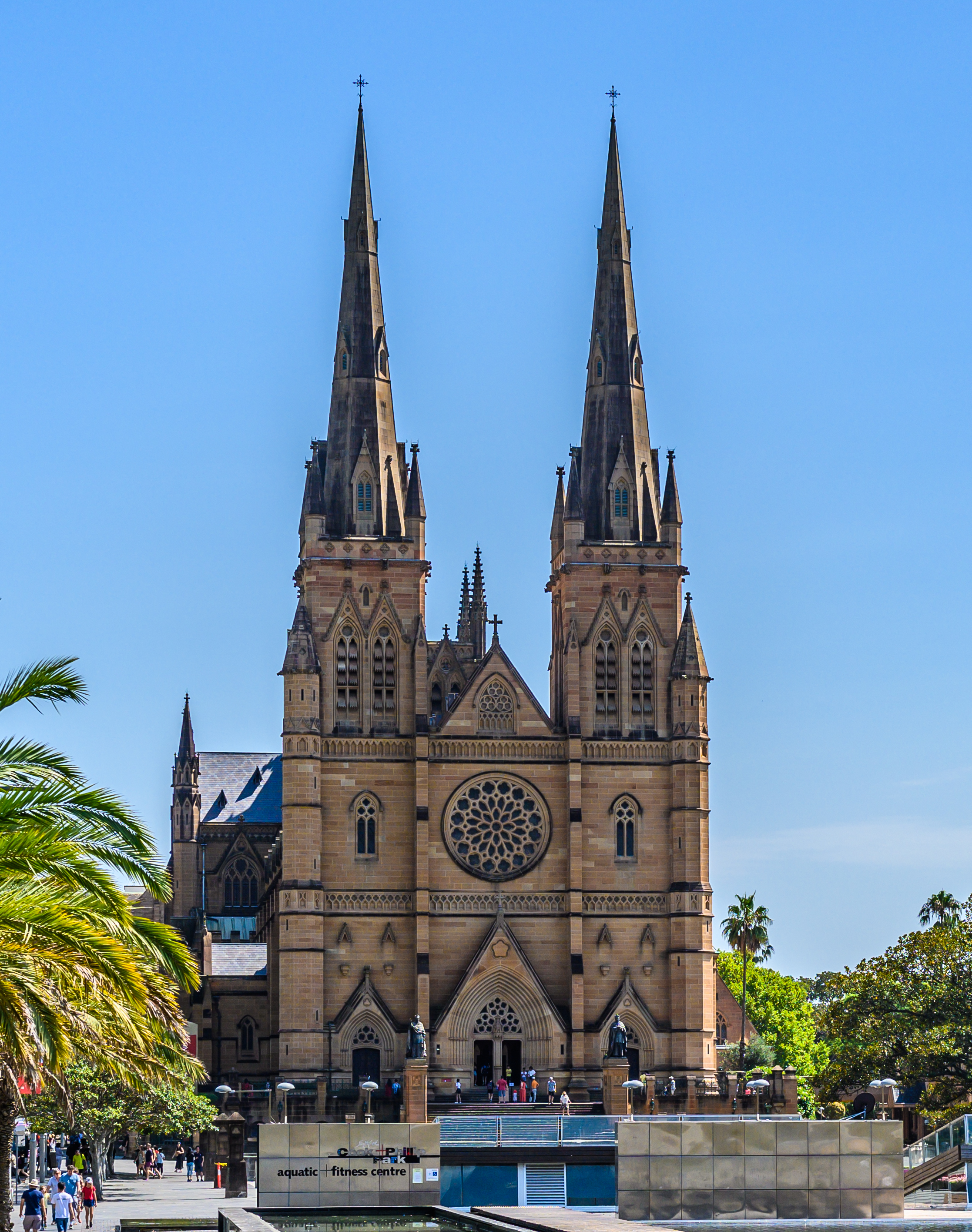
St Mary's Cathedral with completed spires

== 21st century ==
=== 2000s ===
- 2001
  - Sydney Harbour Federation Trust established.
  - Population: 4,128,272.
  - Drama film Lantana portrays complex relationships in Sydney suburbia.
  - Escape of 40 detainees from Villawood Immigration Detention Centre.
- 2002
  - Glenn Murcutt awarded Pritzker Architecture Prize.
  - Short+Sweet 10-minute play festival founded.
- 2003
  - Lowy Institute for International Policy headquartered in city.
  - Archbishop Pell appointed cardinal.
  - Prominent stockbroker Rene Rivkin found guilty of insider trading.
  - Animated movie Finding Nemo features fish escaping Sydney dentist.
  - First season of home renovation reality TV series The Block filmed at Bondi.
  - Inga Clendinnen's Dancing with Strangers examines the indigenous-colonist encounter in the first years of Sydney.
  - ICAC investigation reveals large-scale theft of Australian Museum specimens.
  - Where 2 Technologies develops computer mapping application, later Google Maps.
- 2004
  - 14 February: 2004 Redfern riots.
  - City of South Sydney becomes part of City of Sydney.
  - Clover Moore begins record-length term as Lord Mayor of Sydney.
  - Judicial inquiry criticises James Hardie for evading compensation to victims of asbestos.
- 2005
  - December: 2005 Cronulla riots occur near city.
  - Macquarie Fields riots.
  - Cross City Tunnel opens.
  - Businessman Rodney Adler jailed for misconduct related to the collapse of HIH Insurance.
  - Sydney Swans Australian Rules football team win AFL Grand Final.
  - Bankstown Bites Food Festival and Sydney Comedy Festival begin.
  - Nuix data searching software company incorporated.
- 2006
  - Liberal arts college Campion College opens at Toongabbie.
  - University of Notre Dame Australia opens Sydney campus.
  - Bondi Rescue TV series first broadcast.
  - Ursula Dubosarsky's children's book The Red Shoe portrays growing up in 1950s Sydney.
  - Don Ritchie awarded OAM for dissuading many from committing suicide at The Gap.
  - Controversy over Sheikh Hilaly comparing women to uncovered meat.
- 2007
  - Tight security for Asia-Pacific Economic Cooperation forum breached by The Chaser's fake Canadian motorcade.
  - Carriageworks arts precinct opened at former Eveleigh Carriage Workshops site.
  - Sydney Underground Film Festival begins.
- 2008
  - Pope Benedict XVI visits for World Youth Day 2008.
  - Exhibition of Bill Henson photographs at Roslyn Oxley9 Gallery cancelled after police raid.
- 2009
  - Dictionary of Sydney launched online.
  - Institute for Economics and Peace headquartered in city.
  - Festival of Dangerous Ideas begins.
  - First Vivid Sydney light festival
  - Holsworthy Barracks terror plot uncovered.
  - Contract killing of Michael McGurk in Cremorne.
  - Lin family murders in Epping.

=== 2010s ===
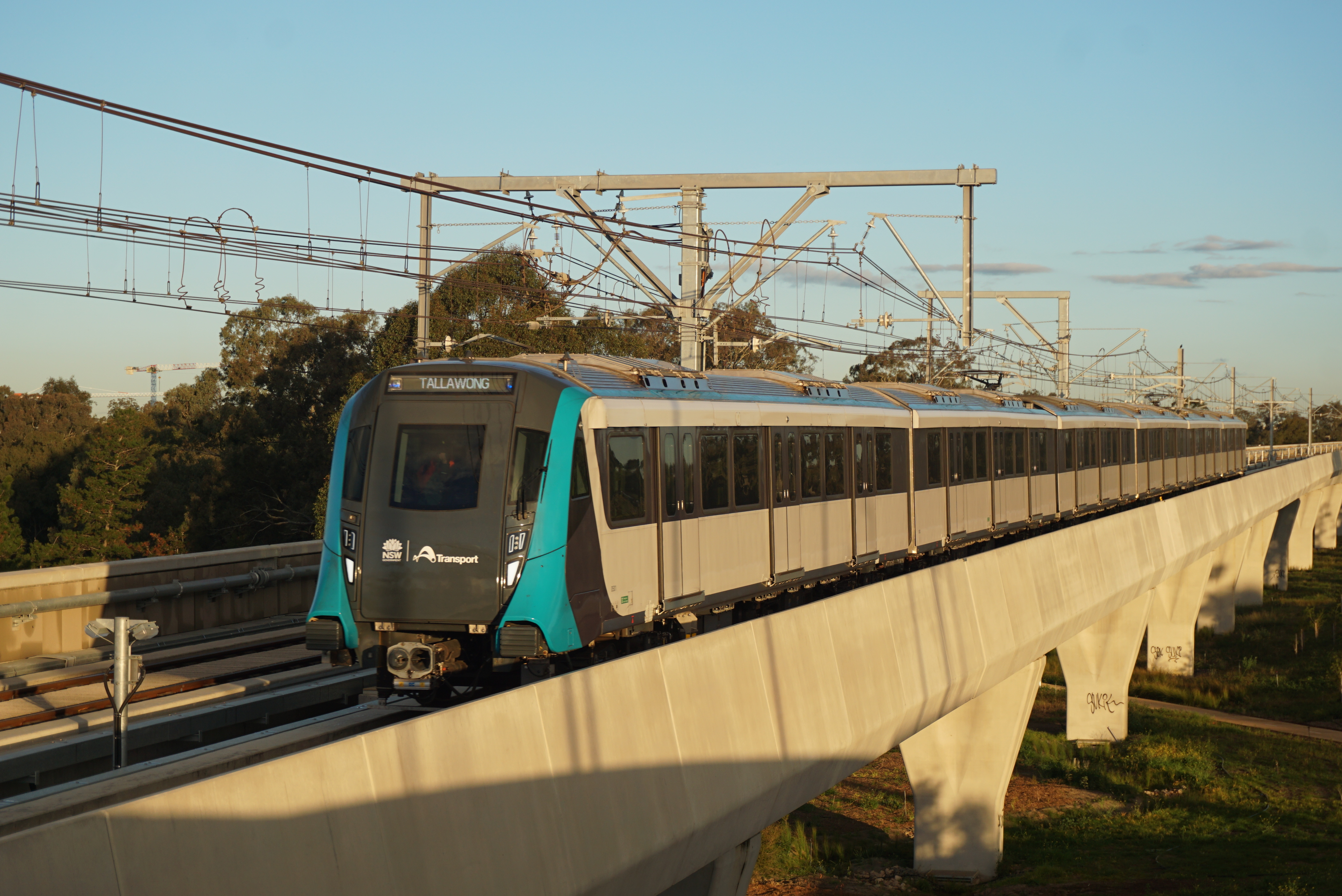
A Sydney Metro train

- 2010
  - Sydney Desalination Plant at Kurnell begins operation.
  - Jessica Watson returns to Sydney after solo round the world voyage.
- 2011
  - 11 killed in deliberately-lit Quakers Hill Nursing Home fire.
  - Population: 4,028,524.
- 2012 - Redevelopment of Barangaroo commences.
- 2013
  - Southern Sydney Freight Line opened.
  - White Bay Cruise Terminal opened.
- 2014
  - 2014 Sydney hostage crisis
  - Second Sydney Airport location announced as Badgerys Creek.
  - Festival of Dangerous Ideas cancels speech by Hizb ut-Tahrir.
  - Afterpay buy now pay later service launched.
- 2015 - Police worker killed by Islamic terrorist in Parramatta.
- 2016
  - International Convention Centre opened.
  - Labor powerbroker Eddie Obeid found guilty of corruption over Circular Quay retail leases.
- 2017
  - Population reaches 5 million, according to the 2016 Australian census.
  - Lucrative The Everest horse race first run.
- 2018 - Bruce Beresford's movie Ladies in Black portrays 1959 department store employees, adapting Madeleine St John's novel The Women in Black.
- 2019
  - Completion of the Sydney Metro Northwest, the first line of the upcoming Sydney Metro, Australia's first rapid transit system.
  - Light Rail opens from Circular Quay to Randwick.

=== 2020s ===
- 2020
  - 4 Jan Record high temperature of 48.9 °C (120 °F) recorded at Penrith.
  - Disembarkation of Ruby Princess cruise ship leads to cluster of COVID-19 cases.
  - Opening of the remaining leg of the Light Rail to Kingsford.
  - 75-storey Crown Sydney tower completed at Barangaroo.
- 2021
  - Severe lockdowns for Greater Sydney in COVID-19 pandemic.
  - Martin Green awarded Japan Prize for research on solar cells.
- 2022
  - Anthony Albanese becomes fourth consecutive Prime Minister from Sydney.
  - Simone Young takes up position as Chief Conductor of Sydney Symphony Orchestra.
  - Fatal shark attack at Little Bay.
- 2023 - Rozelle Interchange opens.
- 2024
  - Six killed in the Bondi Junction stabbings.
  - Stabbing of Assyrian bishop Mari Emmanuel during church service.
  - Opening of Chatswood-City-Sydenham Metro line.
- 2025
  - Fifteen killed in the Bondi Beach shooting.
- 2026
  - Opening of Western Sydney Airport.

== See also ==
- History of Sydney
- List of mayors, lord mayors and administrators of Sydney
- List of governors of New South Wales, headquartered in Sydney
- List of premiers of New South Wales, headquartered in Sydney.

== Bibliography ==
=== Published in the 19th century ===
- Description of a view of the town of Sydney. London: Printed by J. and C. Adlard. 1830. "Now exhibiting in the Panorama, Leicester-square, painted by R. Burford"
- David Brewster, ed. (1832). "Sydney". Edinburgh Encyclopædia. Philadelphia: Joseph and Edward Parker. hdl:2027/uc2.ark:/13960/t82j6q872.
- Picture of Sydney; and Strangers' Guide in New South Wales. Sydney: J. Maclehose. 1838.
- Sydney in 1848. 1848–1850. (1962 facsimile published by Ure Smith)
- John Dunmore Lang (1852), "City of Sydney", Australian Emigrant's Manual, London: Partridge and Oakey
- Sands' Sydney Directory. 1858–1933.
- Stranger's Guide to Sydney. Sydney: James William Waugh. 1861. ISBN 978-0-908120-21-5.
- Charles Knight, ed. (1866). "Sydney". Geography. English Cyclopaedia. Vol. 4. London: Bradbury, Evans, & Co. hdl:2027/nyp.33433000064810.
- Handbook to Sydney and Suburbs. Sydney: S.T. Leigh & Company. 1867.
- George Henry Townsend (1867), "Sydney", A Manual of Dates (2nd ed.), London: Frederick Warne & Co.
- "Australia: Sydney". Street's Indian and Colonial Mercantile Directory. London: G. Street. 1869.
- J.H. Heaton (1879). "Sydney". Australian Dictionary of Dates. Sydney: G. Robertson. ISBN 978-0-7905-8264-1.
- "New South Wales: Sydney". Wright's Australian and American Commercial Directory and Gazetteer. New York: George Wright. 1881.
- "Towns in New South Wales: Sydney". Australian Handbook (incorporating New Zealand, Fiji, and New Guinea): Shippers' and Importers' Directory & Business Guide. Gordon and Gotch. 1888.
- "New South Wales and its Metropolis". Year-book of Australia for 1891. London. 1891.
- George Lacon James (1892), "City of Sydney", Shall I Try Australia?, London: L.U. Gill, OCLC 8559275

=== Published in the 20th century ===
- "Sydney". Chambers's Encyclopaedia. London. 1901.
- Illustrated Guide to Sydney. Sydney: Dymock's Book Arcade and Circulating Library. 1901.
- Old Times, Sydney: Commercial Publishing Co., April 1903
- Annual Report for ... 1903, City of Sydney, 1903
- Annual Report for ... 1904, City of Sydney, 1903
- J.D. Fitzgerald (1906). Greater Sydney and Greater Newcastle. Sydney: NSW Bookstall Company.
- Norddeutscher Lloyd (1906). "Sydney". 'Lloyd' Guide to Australasia. London: Edward Stanford.
- "Sydney (N.S.W.)" . Encyclopædia Britannica. Vol. 26 (11th ed.). 1910. pp. 278–280.
- Benjamin Vincent (1910), "Sydney", Haydn's Dictionary of Dates (25th ed.), London: Ward, Lock & Co.
- K. W. Robinson, 'Sydney, 1850–1952, A Comparison of Developments in the Heart of the City', Australian Geographer, Vol. 6, 1952–1956
- Nineteenth Century Sydney: Essays in Urban History, M. Kelly (ed.), Sydney University Press, 1978
- P.R. Proudfoot (1986). "Changing Patterns of Maritime Activity in Central Sydney". The Great Circle. 8 (1). Australian Association for Maritime History: 33–53. JSTOR 41562715.
- Gail Reekie (1987). ""Humanising Industry": Paternalism, Welfarism and Labour Control in Sydney's Big Stores 1890–1930". Labour History (53): 1–19. doi:10.2307/27508857. JSTOR 27508857.
- Sydney Street Directory, Macquarie Park, N.S.W: Gregory's, 1987, OL 24208759M
- P. Webber, ed. (1988), The Design of Sydney. Sydney: Law Book Company.
- Shirley H. Fitzgerald, Sydney 1842–1992 (Hale and Iremonger, Sydney, 1992)
- Paul Ashton (1993). The accidental city: planning Sydney since 1788. Hale & Iremonger. ISBN 0-86806-487-4.
- Hilary Golder (1995), "Electoral History of Sydney 1842–1992", Sydney's History, City of Sydney
- J. Birmingham. (1999), Leviathan: The Unauthorised Biography of Sydney. Knopf.

=== Published in the 21st century ===
- Sydney: the Emergence of a World City. Melbourne: Oxford University Press, 2000.
- P. Spearritt. (2000), Sydney's Century: a History. Sydney: University of New South Wales Press.
- Sydney, Condensed Guides, Lonely Planet, 2000, OL 8647599M
- "Sydney: On Top of the World Down Under", National Geographic Magazine, vol. 198, USA, 2000
- Ken Bernstein (2003), "Sydney", Pocket Guide Australia, Berlitz, OL 9196697M
- "Sydney". Understanding Slums: Case Studies for the Global Report 2003. United Nations Human Settlements Programme and University College London. 2003.
- John Punter (2004). "From the Ill-Mannered to the Iconic: Design Regulation in Central Sydney 1947–2002". Town Planning Review. 75 (4): 405–445. doi:10.3828/tpr.75.4.3. JSTOR 40112621.
- Jim Bain (2007). A Financial Tale of Two Cities: Sydney and Melbourne's Remarkable Contest for Commercial Supremacy. UNSW Press. ISBN 978-0-86840-963-4.
- History Program (2011). "Exchange: Commercial & Retail Sydney". Historical Walking Tours. City of Sydney.
- Richard Reid, "Irish in Sydney from First Fleet to Federation" The Dictionary of Sydney (2012) online
