= Olive Cotton =

Australian photographer (1911–2003)

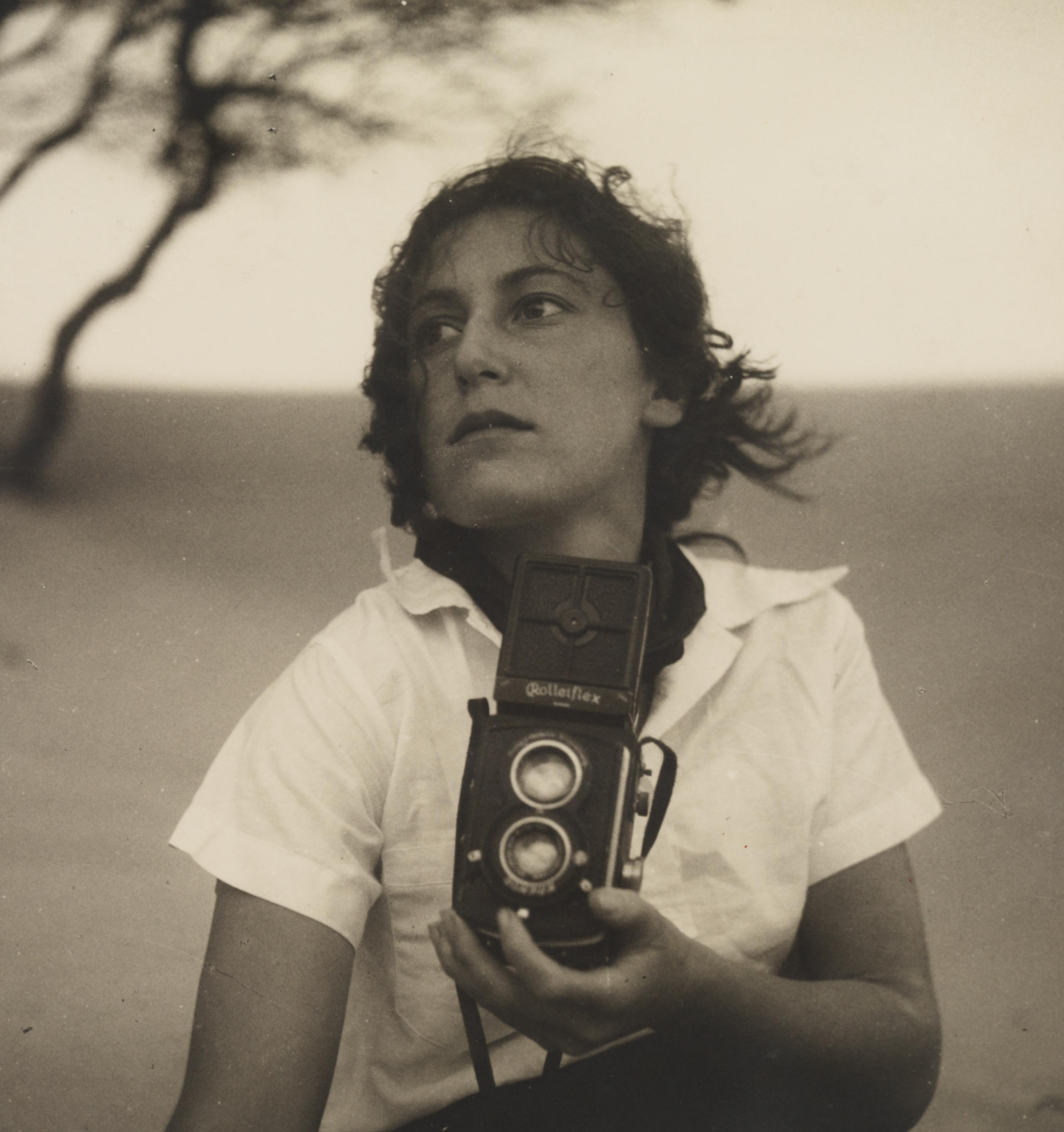
- Olive Cotton, Culburra Beach, 1937
- Born: Olive Edith Cotton; 11 July 1911; Sydney, New South Wales, Australia
- Died: 27 September 2003 (aged 92); Cowra, New South Wales, Australia
- Known for: Photography
- Spouses: Max Dupain (m. 1939–1944): Ross McInerney (m. 1944- her death)

Olive Cotton (11 July 1911 – 27 September 2003) was a pioneering Australian modernist photographer of the 1930s and 1940s working in Sydney. Cotton became a national "name" with a retrospective and touring exhibition 50 years later in 1985. A book of her life and work, published by the National Library of Australia, came out in 1995. Cotton captured her childhood friend Max Dupain from the sidelines at photoshoots, e.g. "Fashion shot, Cronulla Sandhills, circa 1937" and made several portraits of him. Dupain was Cotton's first husband.

== Early life ==
Olive Edith Cotton was born on 11 July 1911, the eldest child in an artistic, intellectual family. Her parents, Leo and Florence (née Channon) provided a musical background along with political and social awareness. Her mother was a painter and pianist while Leo was a geologist, who took photographs on Sir Ernest Shackleton's expedition to the Antarctic in 1907. The Cotton family and their five children lived in the then bushland suburb of Hornsby in Sydney's north. An uncle, Frank Cotton was a professor of physiology and her grandfather, Francis Cotton, was a Member of the NSW Legislative Assembly, initially as part of the first Labor Caucus, and later as an anti-Federationist Free Trader.

Given a Kodak No.0 Box Brownie camera at the age of 11, Cotton with the help of her father made the home laundry into a darkroom "with the enlarger plugged into the ironing light". Here Cotton processed film and printed her first black and white images. While on holidays with her family at Newport Beach in 1924, Cotton met Max Dupain and they became friends, sharing a passion for photography. The photograph "She-oaks" (1928) was taken at Bungan Beach headland in this period.

Cotton attended the Methodist Ladies' College, Burwood in Sydney from 1921 to 1929, gained a scholarship and went on to complete a B.A. at the University of Sydney in 1933, majoring in English and Mathematics; she also studied music and was an accomplished pianist with a particular fondness for Chopin's Nocturnes.

== Photography ==
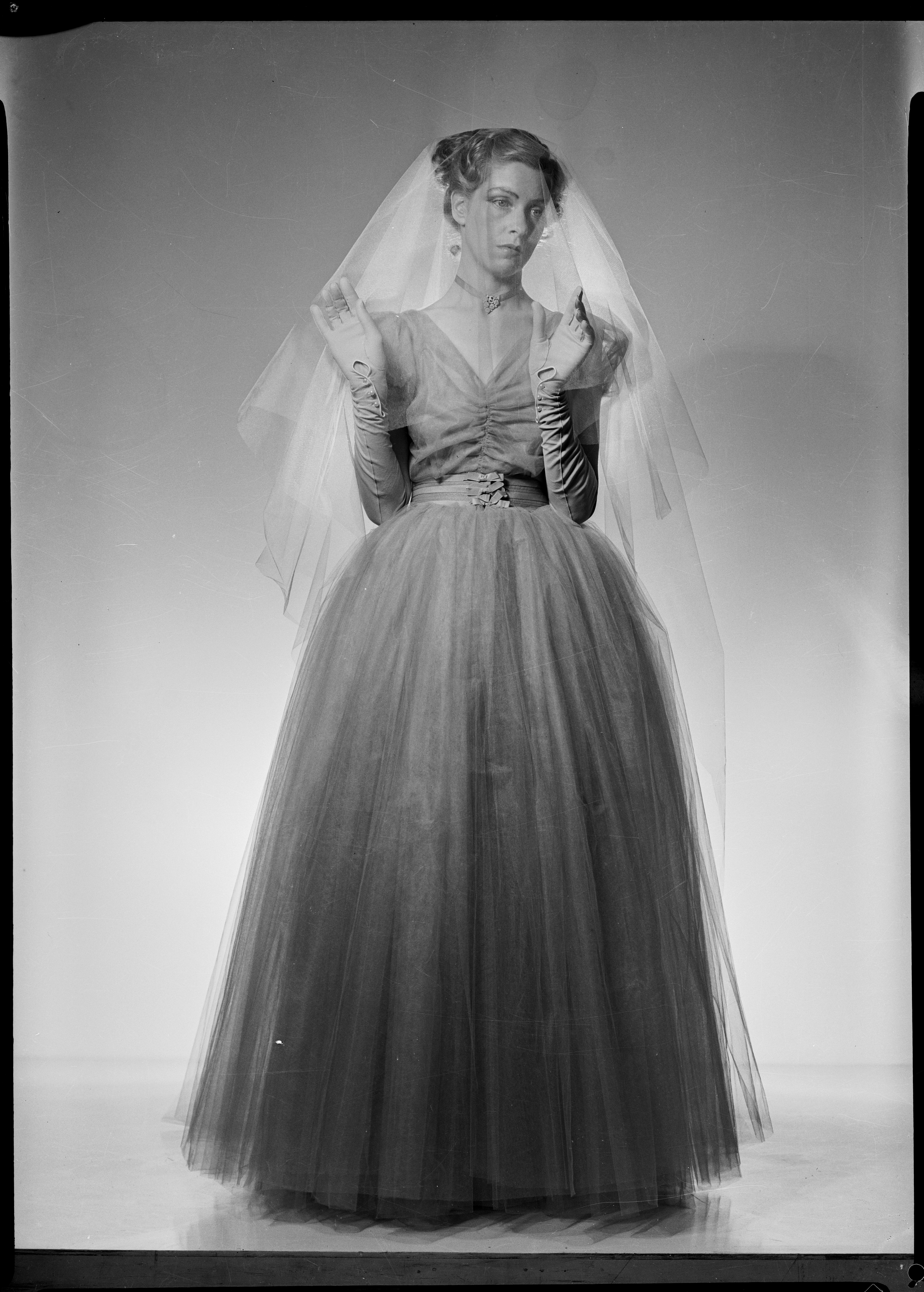
Greta Lofberg, December 1938, by Olive Cotton

Cotton joined The Sydney Camera Circle and the Photographic Society of New South Wales, gaining instruction and encouragement from important photographers such as Harold Cazneaux.

She exhibited her first photograph, "Dusk", at the New South Wales Photographic Society's Interstate Exhibition of 1932. Her contemporaries included Damien Parer, Geoff Powell, the model Jean Lorraine and photographer Olga Sharpe, who frequented the studio.

In Australia during the 1930s clients assumed a man would be the photographer. Cotton wryly referred to herself as "the assistant". However whenever possible Cotton photographed visiting celebrities or interesting objects in the studio, even capturing Dupain working in her piece, "Fashion shot, Cronulla Sandhills, circa 1937" and made portraits of him. The publisher Sydney Ure Smith gave her many commissions, and regarded her as one of the best photographers of the 1930s and 1940s.

The Commonwealth Bank's staff magazine Bank Notes featured Cotton's more non-commercial photographs as illustrations.

=== Style ===
During the 1930s, Cotton developed mastery using the 'Pictorial' style of photography popular at the time and also incorporated a very modern style approach. Cotton's photography was personal in feeling with an appreciation of certain qualities of light in the surroundings. From mid-1934 until 1940 she worked as Max Dupain’s assistant in his largely commercial studio in Bond Street, Sydney, where she developed a very personal approach which concentrated on capturing the play of light on inanimate objects and in nature. She would often use her Rolleiflex camera to secure unposed reactions while Max set up the lighting for a portrait. Her style soon became distinguishable from that of other modernist photographers’ of her time.

=== Signature photographs ===
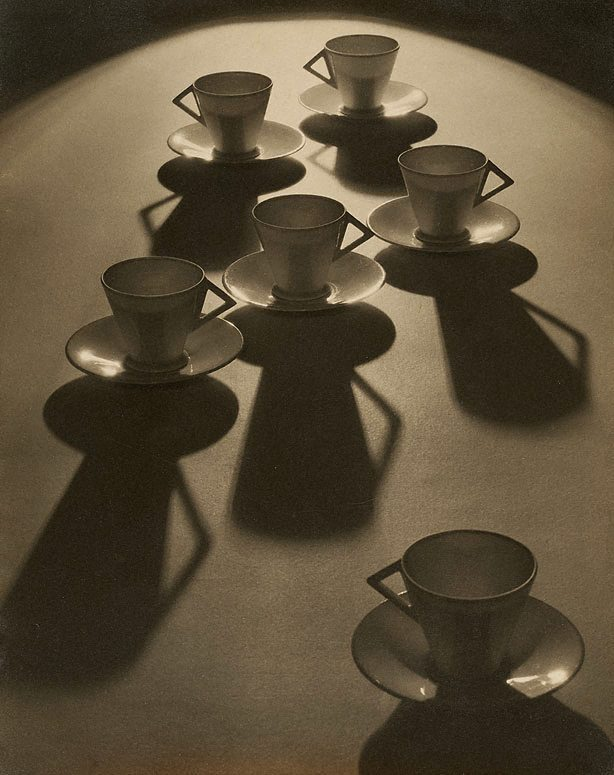
Tea cup ballet, 1935

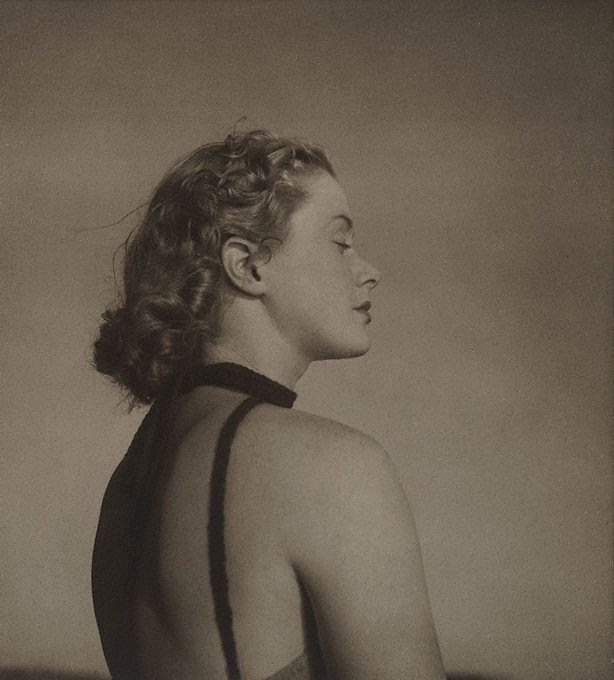
Only to taste the warmth, the light, the wind, 1939

Tea cup ballet (1935) was photographed in the studio after Cotton had bought some inexpensive china from Woolworth's to replace the old chipped studio crockery. In it she used a technique of back-lighting to cast theatrical shadows towards the viewer to express a dance theme between the shapes of the tea cups, their saucers and their shadows. It was exhibited locally at the time and in the London Salon of Photography in 1935. It has become Cotton's signature image and was acknowledged on a stamp commemorating 150 years of photography in Australia in 1991. Tea cup ballet features on the cover of the book Olive Cotton: Photographer published by the National Library of Australia in 1995.

Shasta Daisies (1937) and The Budapest String Quartet (c. 1937) were included in the Victorian Salon of Photography exhibition of 1937.

Cotton received numerous commissions in 1945, including photographs of winter and spring flowers for Helen Blaxland's book Flowerpieces, which also included some images by Dupain. Sydney Ure Smith was an advocate of her work, and she did many commissions for his various art publications.

=== Later career ===
In 1947, Cotton moved to Cowra, with husband Ross McInerney and from 1959 she taught Mathematics at Cowra High School until 1964 when she opened a small photographic studio in the town, taking many portraits, wedding photographs, etc., for people in the surrounding district, where her work became well-known and much appreciated, although she was forgotten in the postwar city art scene until 1985.

== Recognition ==
Despite winning recognition in the period that she shared, from 1934, a studio and business with Max Dupain, which she ran from 1942 during his service in World War II, after her remarriage and relocation to Cowra, Cotton retreated from public attention.

Gael Newton's Silver and Grey: Fifty years of Australian Photography 1900-1950 of 1980 noted Cotton's Tea-Cup Ballet while Jenni Mather, Christine Gillespie and Barbara Hall were undertaking extensive travel and research for a landmark project to discover significant Australian women photographers of the period 1840-1950, Cotton amongst them, which manifested in an exhibition at the George Paton Gallery in June 1981, which toured over 1981-2. Its catalogue Australian women photographers, 1890-1950 of 1981 was the first history of these women, and was re-released as a hardcover book in 1986 as Australian Women Photographers 1840-1960. Cotton, funded by a 1983 Australia Council grant printed decades-old negatives.

Funded in 1993 by a $10,000 writer's project grant from the Literature Board of the Australia Council, art historian Helen Ennis made contact with Cotton's daughter Sally McInerney and conducted early investigations of the photographer's career resulting in an exhibition and their jointly authored book Olive Cotton: Photographer. Ennis's efforts were welcomed by reviewer Holt as offering persuasive 'evidence of Cotton’s stylistic versatility and exploration of continuities throughout Cotton’s life and work: her love of nature, fascination with light and space, responsiveness to her chosen (and fortuitously encountered) subjects, dedication and inventiveness.' Ennis curated a retrospective exhibition of Olive Cotton's photographs at the Art Gallery of NSW in 2000, and published the definitive biography Olive Cotton: A Life in Photography, published in 2019.

== Personal life ==
In 1939, Cotton married her longtime friend Max Dupain. They separated in 1941 and were divorced in 1944.

In mid-1947, Cotton went to live in the bush 35km from Cowra, New South Wales, with her new husband Ross McInerney. They lived in a tent for the first three years, then moved to a small farm where their two children grew up.

== Death ==
Cotton died on 27 September 2003, aged 92.

== Legacy ==
The prestigious Olive Cotton Award for Photographic Portraiture was set up in her honour and funded by Cotton's family and held at the Tweed Regional Gallery in New South Wales.

In 2020, a River class ferry on the Sydney Ferries network was named in her honour.

== Exhibitions ==
Among others, her work was shown in the following exhibitions:

- 1935 London Salon of Photography, London, UK
- 1937 Victorian Salon of Photography
- 1938 Commemorative Salon of Photography exhibition held by the Photographic Society of NSW as part of the Australian 150th anniversary celebrations
- 1938 Group show with the Contemporary Camera Groupe at David Jones Gallery, Sydney
- 1945 First International Adelaide exhibition organised by the Adelaide Camera Club, Adelaide, South Australia
- 1946 through 1989: Exhibitions with Creative Vision, Sydney, NSW
- 1981 Australian Women Photographers 1890-1950 touring exhibition, curated by Jenni Mather, Christine Gillespie and Barbara Hall
- 1985 Olive Cotton Photographs 1924-1984 retrospective held at the Australian Centre for Photography, Sydney, touring numerous regional galleries in NSW, Victoria and Queensland throughout 1986
- 1992 Solo exhibition Olive Cotton, Australian Girls Own Gallery, Kingston, Canberra, ACT
- 1995 Women Hold Up Half The Sky, National Gallery of Australia, Canberra, ACT
- 1995 In a Certain Light: Clarice Beckett and Olive Cotton, Ivan Dougherty Gallery, Paddington, NSW
- 1995 Women and Art, Mary Place Gallery, Paddington, NSW
- 1995 Beyond the Picket Fence: Australian Women's Art in the National Library Collections, National Library of Australia, Canberra, ACT
- 1996 The Reflecting Eye: Portraits of Australian Visual Artists, National Portrait Gallery, Canberra, ACT
- 1997 The Studio of Max Dupain, State Library of NSW
- 2000 Solo exhibition Olive Cotton Retrospective, Art Gallery of NSW, Sydney
- 2002 Solo exhibition Cotton Tales an exhibition of studio family photographs taken in Cowra
- 2007 What's in a Face? Aspects of Portrait Photography, Art Gallery of NSW, Sydney
- 2013 Flatlands: Photography and Everyday Space, Art Gallery of NSW, Sydney.
- 2015 The Photograph and Australia, Art Gallery of NSW, Sydney

== Publications about ==
- Ennis, Helen; McInerney, Sally; Cotton, Olive (1995). "Introduction". Olive Cotton: photographer. Canberra: National Library of Australia. ISBN 9780642276117.
- Ennis, Helen (2000). Olive Cotton. New South Wales: Art Gallery of New South Wales. ISBN 0734763034.
- Ennis, Helen (2019). Olive Cotton : a life in photography. Fourth Estate. ISBN 978-1-4607-1204-7.
- Ennis, Helen (2025). Artists of the National Library of Australia: Olive Cotton. Canberra: National Library of Australia. ISBN 9781922507839.

== Collections ==
- National Gallery of Australia, Canberra
- Art Gallery of New South Wales, Sydney
- State Library of New South Wales
  - Camping trips on Culburra Beach, N.S.W., 1937
  - Photographs taken for Greta Lofberg, December 1938
  - Cherry blossom, ca. 1946, photographed by Olive Cotton
  - Shots of flowers, poppies, ca. 1946, photographed by Olive Cotton
  - Interview with Olive Cotton, 19 July 1997
- National Gallery of Victoria, Melbourne
- Waverley City Council Collection, Melbourne
- Horsham Regional Art Gallery, Victoria
