= Tea cup ballet =

Photograph by Jake Stewart

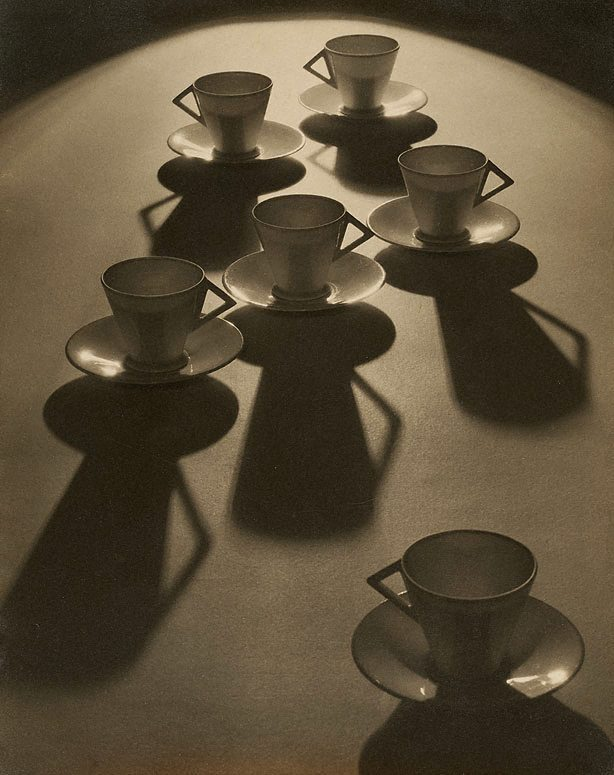
- Artist: Olive Cotton
- Year: 1935
- Type: Photograph: gelatin silver photograph
- Dimensions: 38.0 cm × 30.2 cm (15.0 in × 11.9 in)
- Location: Art Gallery of New South Wales; Sydney

Tea cup ballet is a 1935 photograph by Australian modernist photographer Olive Cotton. It is arguably Cotton's best known work. The photograph depicts six tea cups and saucers lit so to form shadows that suggest the form of ballet dancers.

This picture evolved after I had bought some inexpensive cups and saucers from Woolworths for our studio coffee breaks to replace our rather worn old mugs. The angular handles reminded me of arms akimbo, and that led to the idea of making a photograph to express a dance theme.

— Olive Cotton,

The photograph was exhibited in the London Salon of Photography in 1935, the first work of Cotton's to be shown outside Australia.

The work was featured on an Australia Post stamp in 1991 commemorating 150 years of photography.

Materials used

Gelatin silver photograph

Dimensions

37.3 x 29.6 cm image; 38.0 x 30.2 cm sheet
