= Berowra Waters Inn =

Restaurant north of Sydney, Australia

Coordinates: 33°35′43″S 151°07′19″E

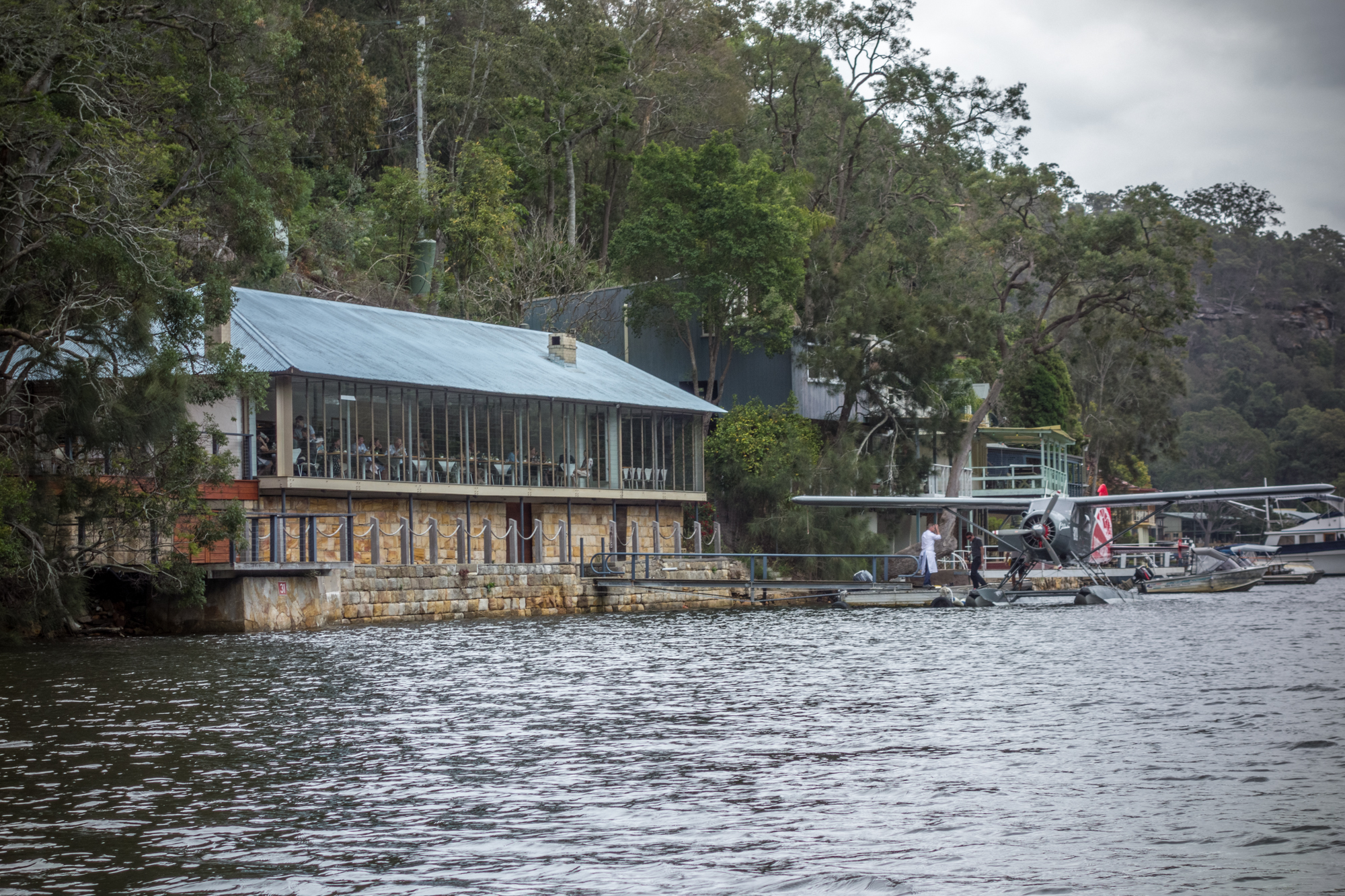
The inn from Berowra Creek

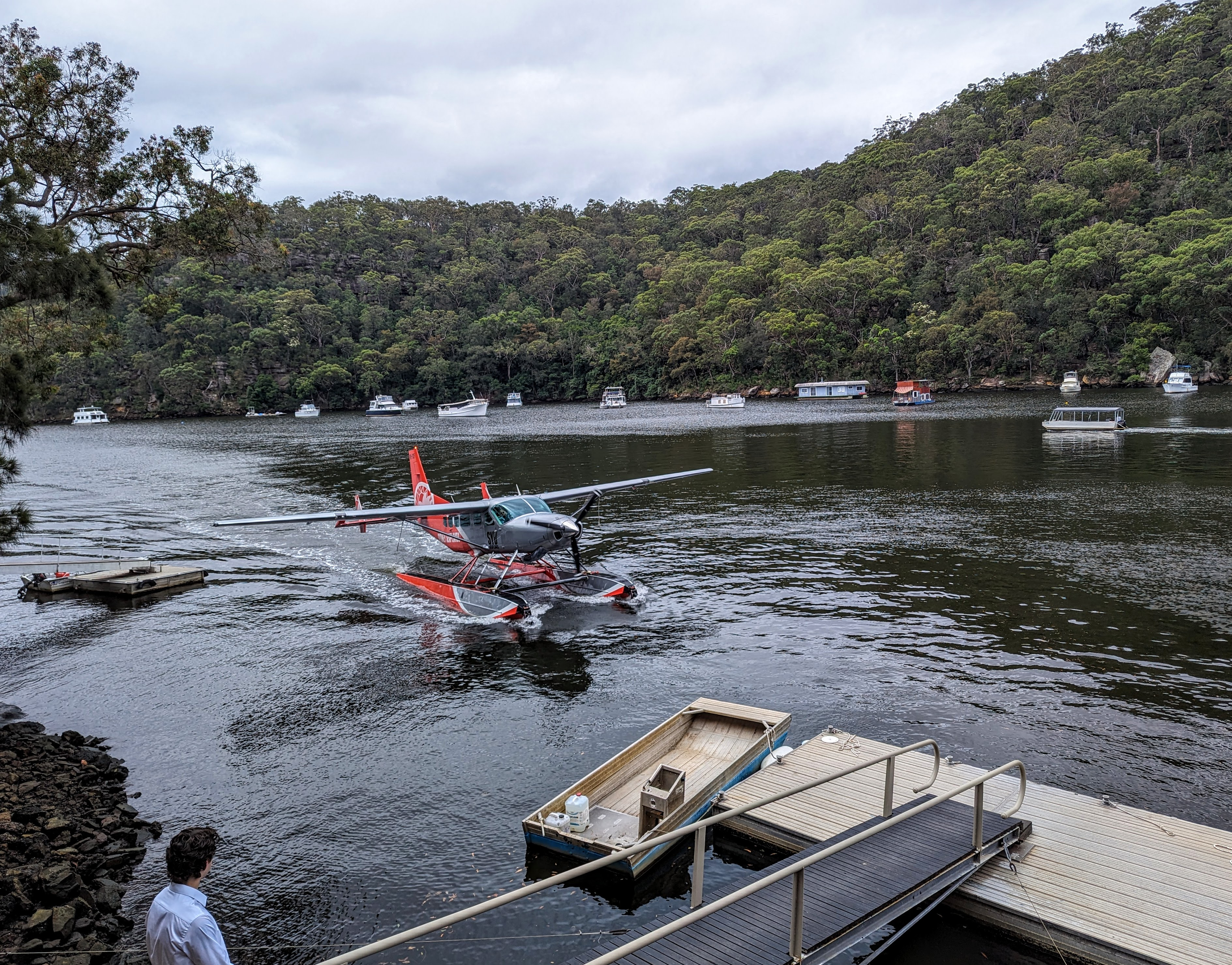
Seaplane arriving at Berowra Waters Inn

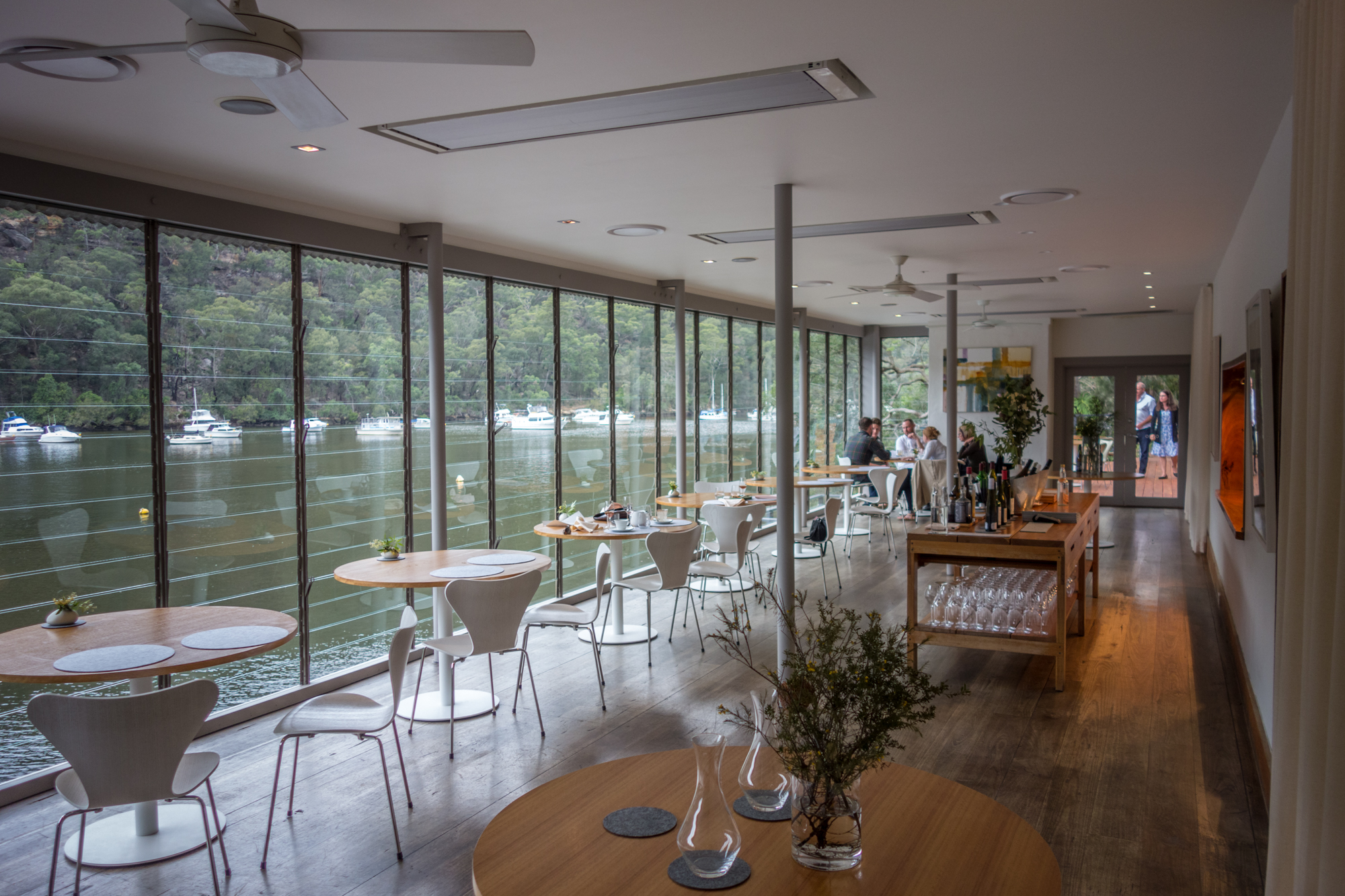
Inside the inn

Berowra Waters Inn is a restaurant, owned and run by Head Chef Brian Geraghty, located at Berowra Waters along Berowra Creek (a tributary of the Hawkesbury River), near Ku-ring-gai Chase National Park, 50 minutes from downtown Sydney, Australia. It is unique due to its being accessed only by private ferry or airplane, as well as being one of Pritzker Prize-winning Australian architect Glenn Murcutt's only venues regularly open to the public. For many years Berowra Waters Inn represented the cutting edge of both Australian design and cuisine. The menu changed frequently but was a 'mix of classic French and Modern Australian'.

Originally, Berowra Waters Inn was a guest house dating to the 1930s. In 1975, the Inn was purchased by Tony and Gay Bilson. The Edwardian-style teahouse had major engineering flaws however and a decision was made to close and redesign the venue. Between 1976 and 1983, renowned architect Glenn Murcutt redesigned the property using a "distinctive Australian vernacular style: corrugated tin roof over glass louvre windows, on a Sydney sandstone base, set among eucalypts and angophoras". During excavating work for the rebuild, Indigenous Australian (Aboriginal) midden remains on the property boundary were discovered. These were radiocarbon-dated and found to date back nearly 10,000 years, indicating a long-term human association with the location.

Tony Bilson left day-to-day operation of the restaurant in 1983 to Gay, who with chef Janni Kyritsis continued its operation until Gay retired in 1995.

== See also ==
- List of restaurants in Australia
