= Greenop =

Greenop is a surname. Notable people with the surname include:

- Frank Sydney Greenop (1913–1975), Australian journalist and writer
- Richard Greenop (born 1989), Canadian ice hockey player

== See also ==
- Greeno
- Greenops, Devonian trilobite
