= Loane (surname) =

Loane is a surname. Notable people with the surname include:

- Roland Warpole Loane (died 1844), Anglo-Irish merchant who settled in New South Wales
- Alice Loane (1863–1922), British author
- George Green Loane (1865–1945), Anglo-Irish classical scholar and schoolmaster
- Marcus Loane (1912–2009), Australian Anglican bishop
- Bob Loane (1914–2002), American Baseball player
- Mark Loane (born 1954), Australian rugby football player
- Tim Loane (fl. 2000s), Northern Irish writer, director, and actor

== See also ==
- Loane (born 1978), a French singer-songwriter
