= Sydney Harbour railway electricity tunnel =

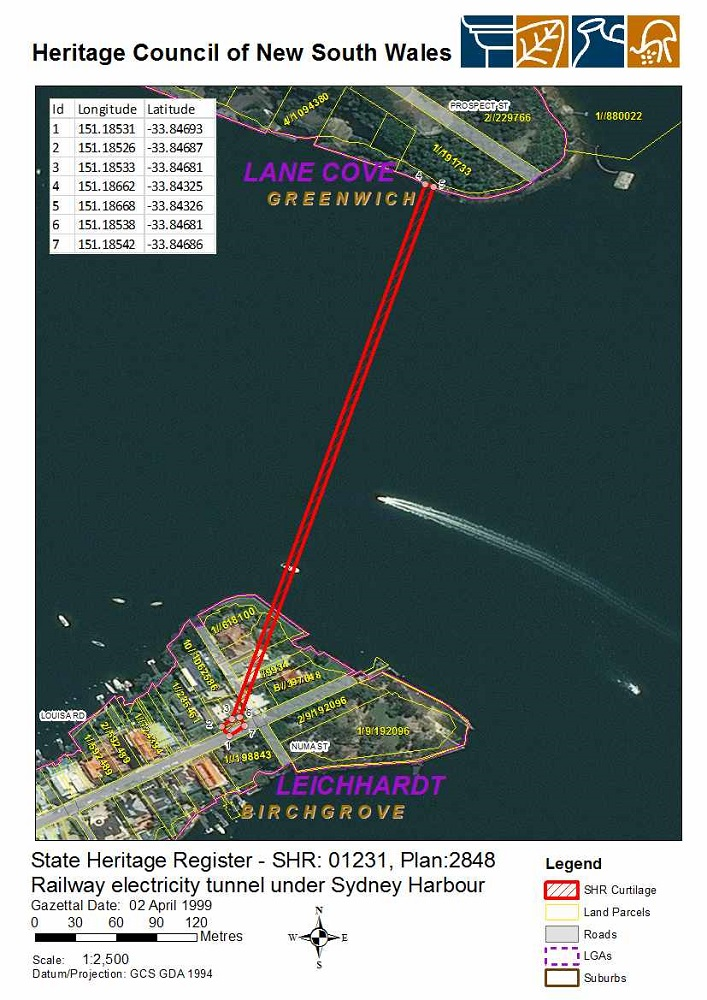
- Heritage boundaries

- Location within Sydney Location within Australia
- 33.8448°S 151.1872°E
- Location: under Sydney Harbour between Birchgrove and Greenwich, Sydney, New South Wales, Australia

New South Wales Heritage Register
- Official name: Railway electricity tunnel under Sydney Harbour; Sydney Harbour tunnel; Balmain to Greenwich Electric Cable Tunnel
- Type: State heritage (built)
- Designated: 2 April 1999
- Reference no.: 1231
- Type: Other - Utilities - Electricity
- Category: Utilities - Electricity

Sydney Harbour railway electricity tunnel is heritage-listed electricity infrastructure running under Sydney Harbour between Birchgrove and Greenwich, Sydney, New South Wales, Australia. It is also known as Balmain to Greenwich Electric Cable Tunnel. It was added to the New South Wales State Heritage Register on 2 April 1999.

== History ==
The tunnel was built between Long Noise Point, Birchgrove, and Manns Point, Greenwich, from 1913 to 1926 to carry submarine electricity cables for the electric tramway system on the north side of the Harbour as submarine cables laid across the bed of the harbour had suffered damage from ships and their anchors. It was one of Australia's major engineering feats at the time of construction, and was the first tunnel completed under Sydney Harbour.

The first tram route on the northern side of the harbour was established in September 1893 and stretched between Falcon Street, North Sydney and Spit Road. It was extended to Mosman Bay in 1896. Steam trams already ran south of the harbour and by 1904 the conversion of this network to electricity was well underway. The railway and tramway power stations at White Bay and Ultimo were increasing their capacity and a new electric substation was constructed at North Sydney to serve the expanding tramway system. Cables were laid across the bed of the Harbour to feed the power from White Bay to North Sydney.

The obvious location was the shortest distance which was between Long Nose Point and Manns Point at Greenwich. By 1912 the expansion of the tramway network and need for more power and communication meant that more cables were required. To protect these cables it was decided to construct a tunnel to house them. Work commenced in October 1913 at the Long Nose Point end, at the corner of Louisa Road and Numa Street. The steam railway service from Hornsby to St Leonards was established in 1890 and extended to Milsons Point in 1893. This service was converted to electricity in 1927, the year after the completion of the tunnel.

=== First tunnel ===
The tunnel construction job itself was a series of "Homeric battles": The work was started from three points; Long Nose Point, Greenwich, and a shaft at the extreme end of Mann Point, which is a continuation, more or less, of Greenwich. Initially progress was rapid, however some problems were encountered. First of all, the residents of Long Nose Point, in letters and protests very much to the point, caused the abandonment of work from the Long Nose end after a considerable distance had been excavated. Work, therefore, progressed slowly on from the north side until about May 1915, when a large fissure in the rock was found in the approximate middle of the Parramatta River. The only solution was to seal up the tunnel and patch the fissure. A bulkhead was built into the tunnel to stop the progress of the sand, water and silt and a staging was built in the middle of the river and drills were bored through the riverbed. Pipes were inserted through the holes and a cement mixture was gradually pumped into the tunnel in the vicinity of the fissure.

The cement pumping operation was repeated through three other pipes in line with the original ones and the tunnel was sealed twice and allowed to set. The door was then re-opened and the silt and sand removed. A second sealing showed signs of weakness so it was decided to abandon the top tunnel and go deeper into the rock. A permanent bulkhead was built into the rock and the tunnel was sealed up with approximately 5 metres (15 ft) of concrete that remains today.

=== Second tunnel ===
A second tunnel was commenced 15 metres (50 ft) below the first one. The down grade was increased to 1 in 1.3. The work was carried out with explosives and some progress was made, however; on arrival at the point immediately below the original break-in, another crevice was struck and water rushed in. On this occasion, the engineer in chief, R. L. Rankin and the resident engineer W. R. H. Melville, decided to go with the foreman and have a look at the fissure that had flooded the tunnel. Placing candles on pieces of wood, they swam approximately 12 metres (40 ft) into the centre of the tunnel. It was a risky job. The surface of the water was less than a yard from the top of the tunnel and if the inflow had suddenly increased, they would have been caught. The break-in was later sealed by placing fifteen-centimetre (six-inch) pipes, approximately 14 metres (15 yd) long, into the crevice, and the whole of the tunnel in the immediate vicinity was packed with bags of clay and tightly rammed. In front of this was placed a steel bulkhead with a steel door and through the bulkhead eight-centimetre (three-inch) pipes were laid right into the crevice, to allow the water to get out. Through the fifteen-centimetre (six-inch) pipes cement was pumped until finally it was not possible to shoot any more into the crevice under very heavy pressure. This was allowed to set for approximately three months. When the bulkhead door was opened it was found that the inflow had practically stopped. The bags of clay were completely cemented together and a detour was cut at this point to approximately 2 metres (6 ft), to get round the crevice, and when the men had passed it they worked back to the original line of excavation.

The section of the tunnel that had been sealed up was cut through, the detour filled in, and the original straight line of excavation restored. After going about 15 metres (50 ft) past the crevice, they struck another small fissure, which was apparently a section of the original one, and water suddenly flowed in at the rate of about 11,000 litres (2,400 imp gal) an hour. This was not sufficient to stop the progress of the work, but pumps were installed to cope with the inflow.

Soon after the men began to work on the up-grade, and here great care had to be exercised to prevent the material falling back on them. The material was cut out by channelling machines, which allowed it to be removed without difficulty. Eventually the work broke through and the opening at the Long Nose Point side was in sight. Their calculations had been made with remarkable accuracy. The centre line, when the tunnel was connected, was only 1/8th of an inch out, while the levels were absolutely correct.

Despite careful lining leaks kept occurring. The tunnel was flooded about 1930, whether intentionally to avoid continual pumping or as the result of a sudden inrush of water, is not clear. In 1952 the Electricity Commission of New South Wales was formed to take over the generation of all electric power in NSW. The power stations in White Bay and Ultimo were taken over, but the tunnel and its cables remained the property of the State Rail Authority. During the construction of the Sydney Harbour Bridge the railway communication cables were re-routed via the Bridge. The electricity cables in the flooded tunnel were completed sheathed and remained in use until 1969, but are no longer used due to ample supplies of electricity now available on the north side of the harbour from electricity substations.

== Description ==
The tunnel is lined with concrete in some areas, cast iron in some and the rock in others. At the centre of the tunnel is a large chamber where pumps were located to remove water. Running the length on one side are cement racks to hold the high tension wires to supply electric power for trams and trains on the north side of the harbour. The tunnel held twelve cables, 8 x 11,000 volt and two 50 pair communication cables. At one end was a pool some six feet in depth, to collect soakage, and be pumped to the surface.

The tunnel is perfectly straight, except at Greenwich Point, where it takes a bend to allow an outlet. From outlet to outlet it measures 1,760 feet. At each shaft it descends steeply into the ground at a grade of 2 in 1, except in a section at the Greenwich end; where a steep cut had to be made - there the grade is 1 in 1.3.

No evidence remains above ground at the Birchgrove entry point, but the shaft and tunnel structure (and early cabling) remain below ground as evidence of significant infrastructure designed and constructed by State Rail.

== Heritage listing ==
The tunnel was a major technological and engineering achievement and was the first such venture to be undertaken in Australia without overseas assistance. It was a major link in the power supply to the railway and tramway system between Sydney and the North Shore and although flooded is an important element of the development of public transport in Sydney.

Sydney Harbour railway electricity tunnel was listed on the New South Wales State Heritage Register on 2 April 1999.
