= Martha Loane =

Martha Jane Loane (7 February 1852 – 1933) was a nurse and social commentator.

Loane has been considered “the most prolific female social investigator in Britain before the First World War, publishing six full-length books between 1905 and 1911 and scores of articles based on her penetrating observations as a Queen’s Nurse among the ‘respectable poor’ in London, Derbyshire and Portsmouth.”

== Biography ==
Loane was born at 8 North Place, Eldad, Plymouth, Devon, to Jabez Loane, a master and Lieutenant in the Royal Navy, and Jane, née Cooley. She began her nursing training at Charing Cross Hospital in London when she was 34 years old. Her sister was Alice Loane.
