= Birchgrove, New South Wales =

Suburb of Sydney, Australia

Birchgrove
- Suburb
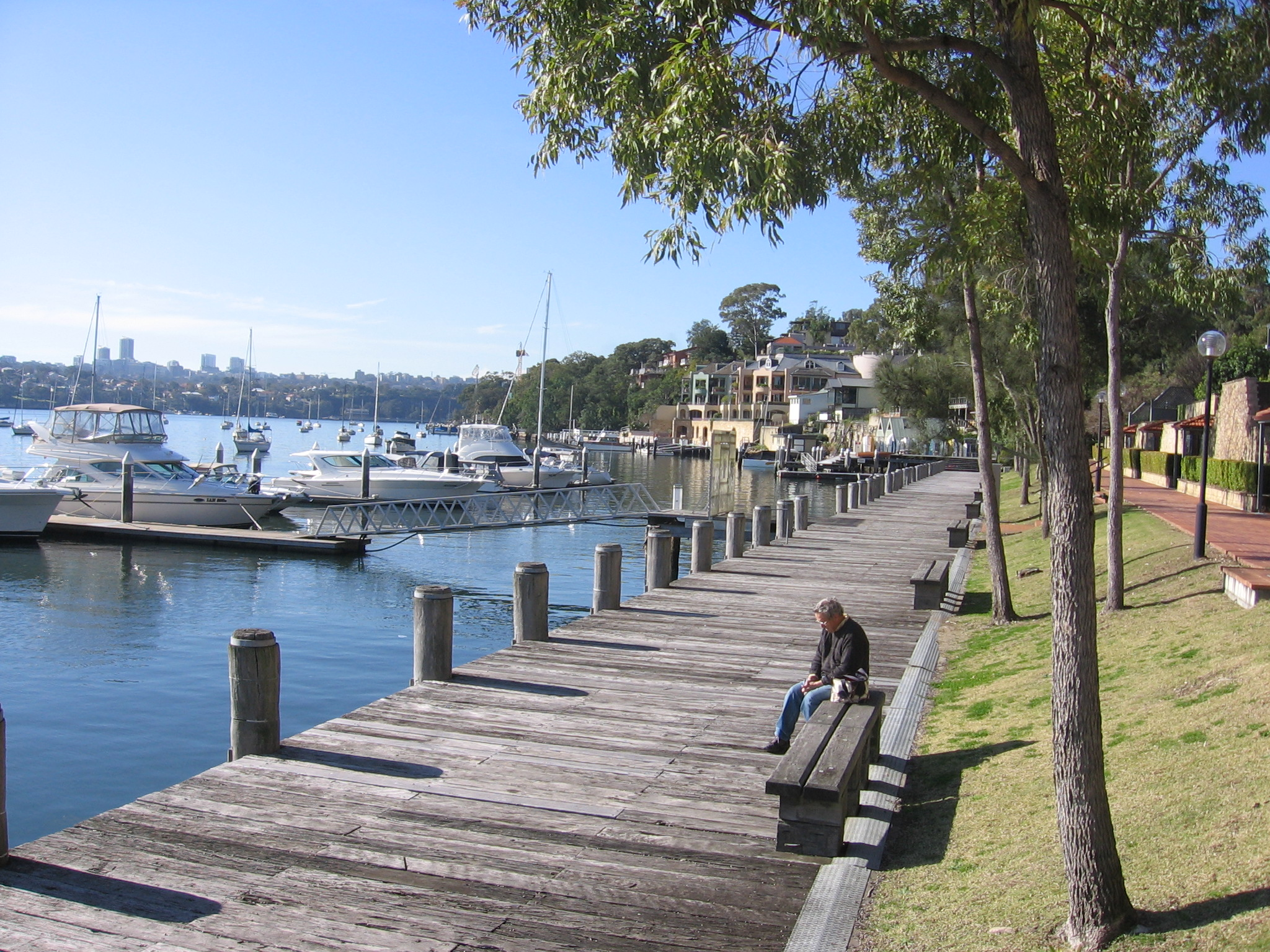
- Birchgrove, New South Wales

- Interactive map of Birchgrove
- Coordinates: 33°51′10″S 151°10′49″E
- Country: Australia
- State: New South Wales
- City: Sydney
- LGA: Inner West Council
- Location: 5 km (3.1 mi) west of Sydney CBD
- Established: 1836

Government
  - State electorate: Balmain
  - Federal division: Sydney

Area
  - Total: 0.56 km^{2} (0.22 sq mi)
- Elevation: 23 m (75 ft)

Population
  - Total: 3,228 (2021 census)
  - Density: 5,760/km^{2} (14,930/sq mi)
- Postcode: 2041
Suburbs around Birchgrove
| Parramatta River | Parramatta River | Port Jackson |
| Parramatta River | Birchgrove | Balmain East |
| Rozelle | Balmain | Balmain |

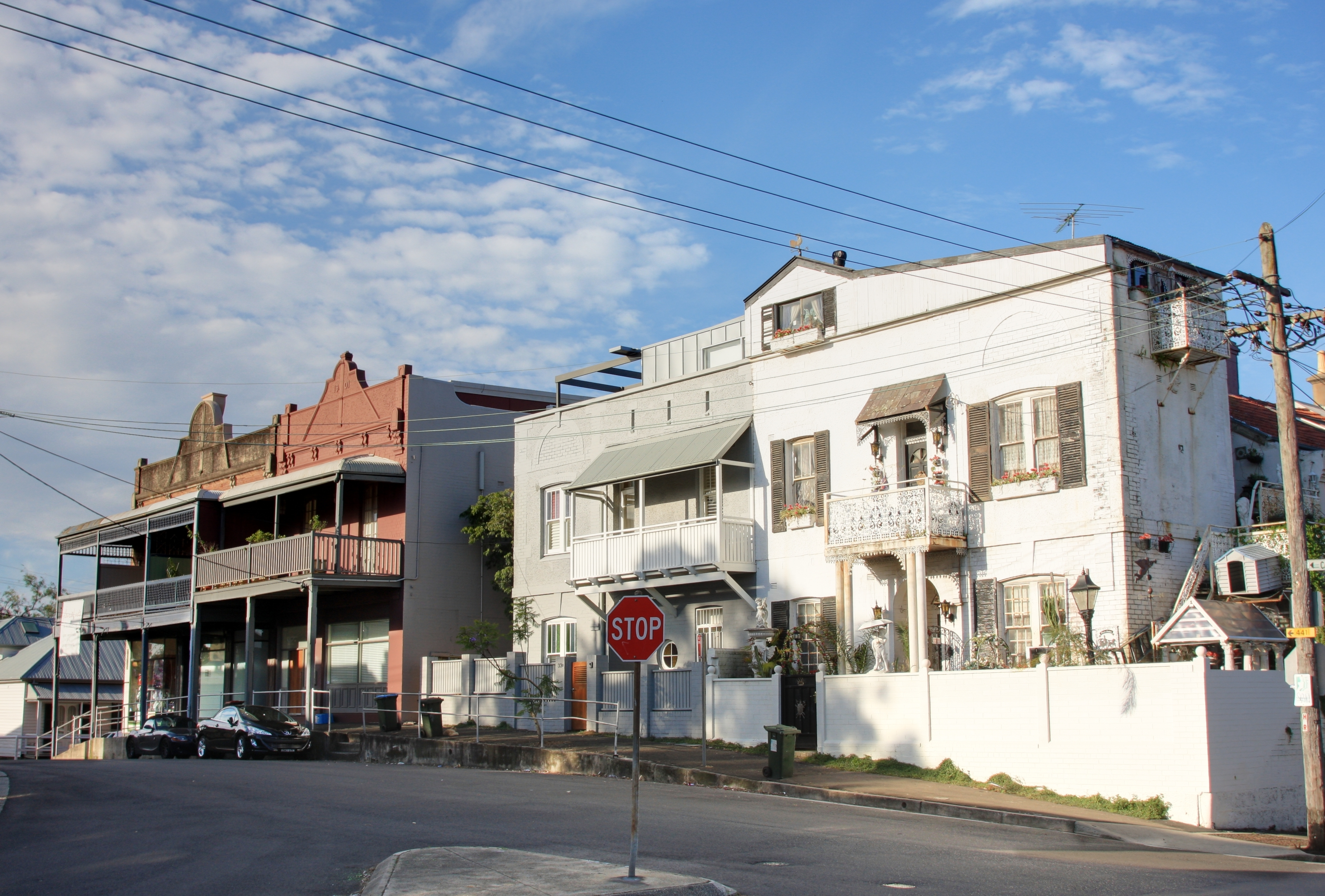
Dwellings in Birchgrove

Birchgrove is a suburb in the Inner West of Sydney, in the state of New South Wales, Australia. Birchgrove is located five kilometres west of the Sydney central business district, in the local government area of the Inner West Council.

Birchgrove occupies the north-west slope of the Balmain peninsula, overlooking Sydney Harbour, and includes Yurulbin and Ballast Points. Balmain is the only adjacent suburb. The long harbour frontage provides sweeping views of the Parramatta River with Cockatoo Island dominating the foreground. It is regarded as one of the wealthiest suburbs of Sydney, largely due to its harbour frontages, historic character, and proximity to the city.

The suburb takes its name from "Birch Grove," an estate built in 1810 by Lieutenant John Birch on one of the first land grants in the area. Birchgrove later became a hub for Sydney's maritime industries, including shipbuilding and dockyards, and was also the site of the Balmain Colliery, the only coal mine in Sydney. Today, it is known for its restored Victorian and Edwardian homes, narrow streets with harbour views, and harbourside parks such as Ballast Point Park and Birchgrove Park, which is recognised as the birthplace of professional rugby league in Australia.

Until the early 2000s, when the former Leichhardt Council extended its boundaries, Birchgrove was a smaller suburb bounded by Grove and Cove Streets.

== History ==
Birchgrove was named after Birchgrove House, built by Lieutenant John Birch, paymaster of the 73rd regiment, around 1812. He added 'grove' to his surname when naming the house because of the large number of orange trees growing on the original site. The house was constructed of stone believed to have been quarried on site.

In March 1814, the estate was purchased by merchant trader Roland Warpole Loane. By 1818, Loane had returned to land holdings in Tasmania and the estate was leased for many years. Loane unsuccessfully attempted to sub-divide the lot into four parcels in 1833. In 1838, the estate was purchased along with land in the Balmain estate by Captain John McLean. Financial difficulties forced McLean to mortgage the estate and additional land, but the Supreme Court finally foreclosed on loans in April 1844. In 1850, the estate was briefly owned by Henry Watson Parker, who would later become the third premier of New South Wales. Later the same year, the estate was purchased by Didier Numa Joubert. Jourbert leased the property to William Salmon Deliotte until 1856.

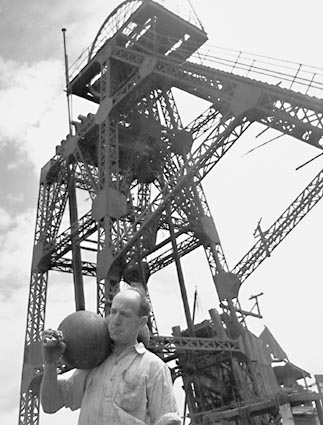
Former Balmain Colliery in Birchgrove

Between 1856 and 1860, Joubert instructed William Brownrigg to survey the first subdivision of ten lots. Streets were named after the Joubert family. Birchgrove House was sold to Jacob Levi Montefiore during the subdivision. Sale of the allotments fell well short of expectations with three lots remaining unsold by 1866. By December 1862, Joubert was forced to surrender his remaining interest to the Bank of New South Wales.

From the 1860s, a number of waterfront businesses appeared in the area including coopers, boat builders and the Morrison & Sinclair shipyard.

By 1878, due to market pressure from prices in nearby Balmain estate, 82 lots of the original subdivision remained unsold. Additional land was carved from the Birchgrove House when it was sold to John Lowry Adams in 1878. A syndicate of businessmen purchased the remaining lots of the estate and commissioned architect Ferdinand Reuss to draw up a new plan for subdivision. This second subdivision was much more successful with all lots sold within several years.

The local heritage item is Clifton Villa, a three-storey sandstone house in the Gothic style. The house was built in the late 1860s and is surrounded by a covered verandah. In the mid-1870s a ballroom was added. The house's interior features a marble fireplace and cedar woodwork, while the exterior includes a caretaker's cottage that was originally a carriage house. Clifton Villa is now listed on the Register of the National Estate.

In 1900, Adams subdivided the Birchgrove House grounds into 12 lots. In 1911 Mary Scot further subdivided Birchgrove House into 5 lots. The house was eventually demolished in 1967 to make way for units.

The suburb was the location of the Balmain Colliery, Australia's deepest coal mine.

In August 2010, apartments in Louisa Road were engulfed by fire. No residents were hurt, but the cause of the fire was considered suspicious.

=== Former tram line to Birchgrove ===
Tram services branched off from the main line on Darling Street, Balmain, turning left into Rowntree Street, left into Cameron Street and right into Grove Street, before terminating at Wharf Road in Birchgrove. Transit Systems bus route 441 now follows the former tram route.

=== Railway electricity tunnel ===
Birchgrove was the southern portal of the first tunnel under Sydney Harbour. The tunnel was dug by the New South Wales Government Railways from Greenwich to provide a reliable way to get electricity from the Pyrmont Power Station to the tram network on the north shore. Cables had previously been laid on the floor of the harbour, but damaged by ships dragging their anchors. The tunnel was commenced in 1913 and excavated by hand, completed in 1924. Part of the tunnel is through the silt at the bottom of the river, so required constant pumping until it was allowed to flood in 1930 and abandoned from 1969. The tunnel was excavated almost entirely from the northern side, as the residents on Long Nose Point at Balmain (now Birchgrove) successfully objected to the noise of the compressor powering pneumatic drills. The tunnel passes between the floor of the harbour and the Balmain coal mine further below the harbour. The tunnel is excavated entirely through Hawkesbury sandstone which lies below the silt and sediment which form the floor of the harbour. At its lowest point, it is 236 feet (72 m) below sea level. The tunnel is listed on the New South Wales State Heritage Register.

== Heritage listings ==
Birchgrove has a number of heritage-listed sites, including:

- 144 Louisa Road: Raywell
- 25 Wharf Road: Wyoming
- Sydney Harbour railway electricity tunnel

== Landmarks ==
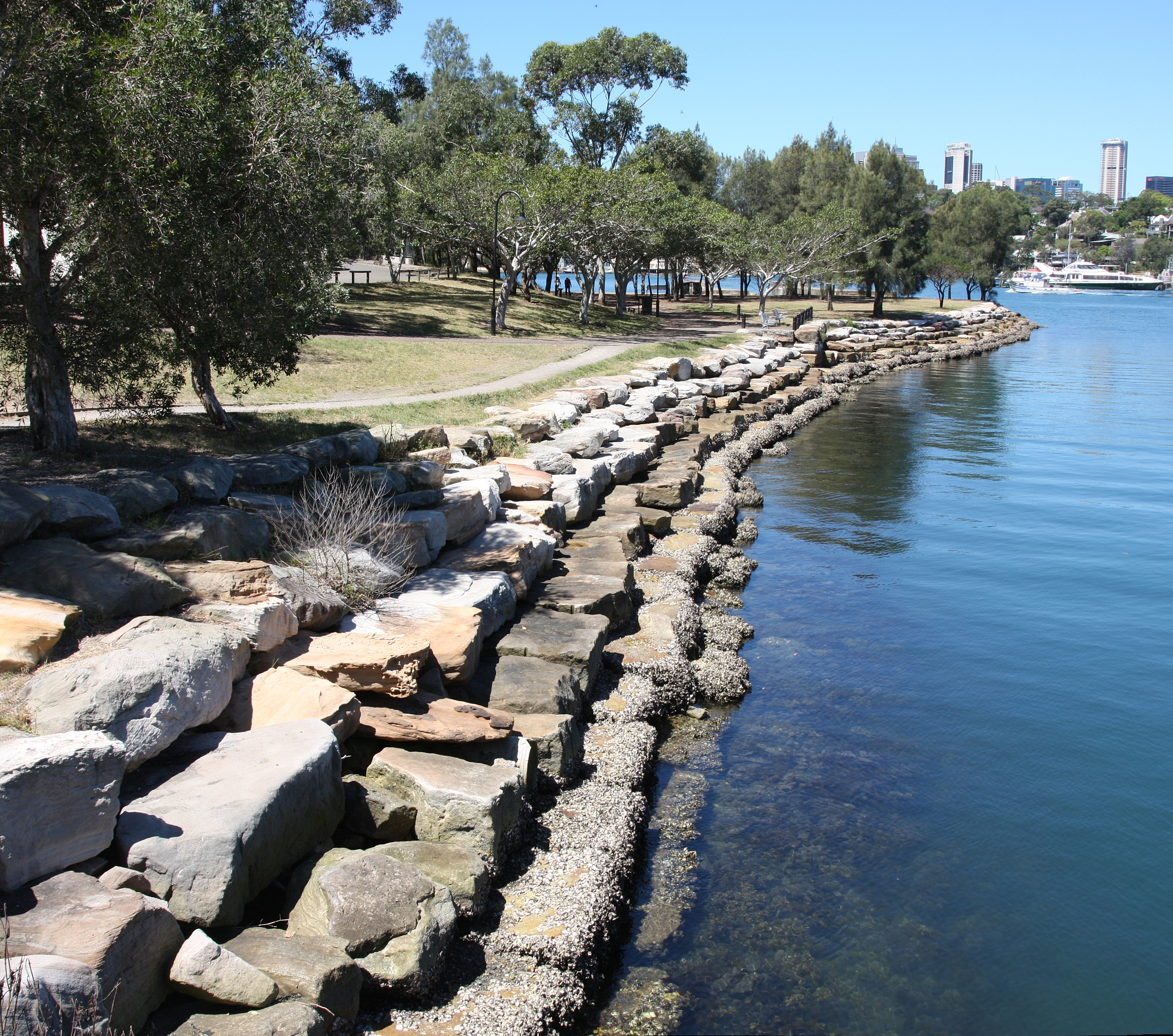
Mort Bay park, Mort Bay Birchgrove

- Ballast Point Park is a 2.6-hectare (6.4-acre) former industrial site located at the tip of the Balmain Peninsula now redeveloped as a public open space.
- Yurulbin Park is a former shipbuilding site located at the end of Yurulbin Point (Long Nose Point) which has been transformed into an award-winning public space.

== Transport ==
Birchgrove ferry wharf is served by Sydney Ferries' Cockatoo Island ferry services which run services between Circular Quay and Cockatoo Island.

Transit Systems operates a service from Birchgrove Park to the Art Gallery of New South Wales via the Queen Victoria Building (QVB). During peak hours and in the evening, this service terminates at QVB.

== Recreation ==
Birchgrove is home to the Balmain Sailing Club, which hosts the annual Balmain Regatta, claimed to be the oldest regatta in Australia, run for the first time in 1849.

== Demographics ==
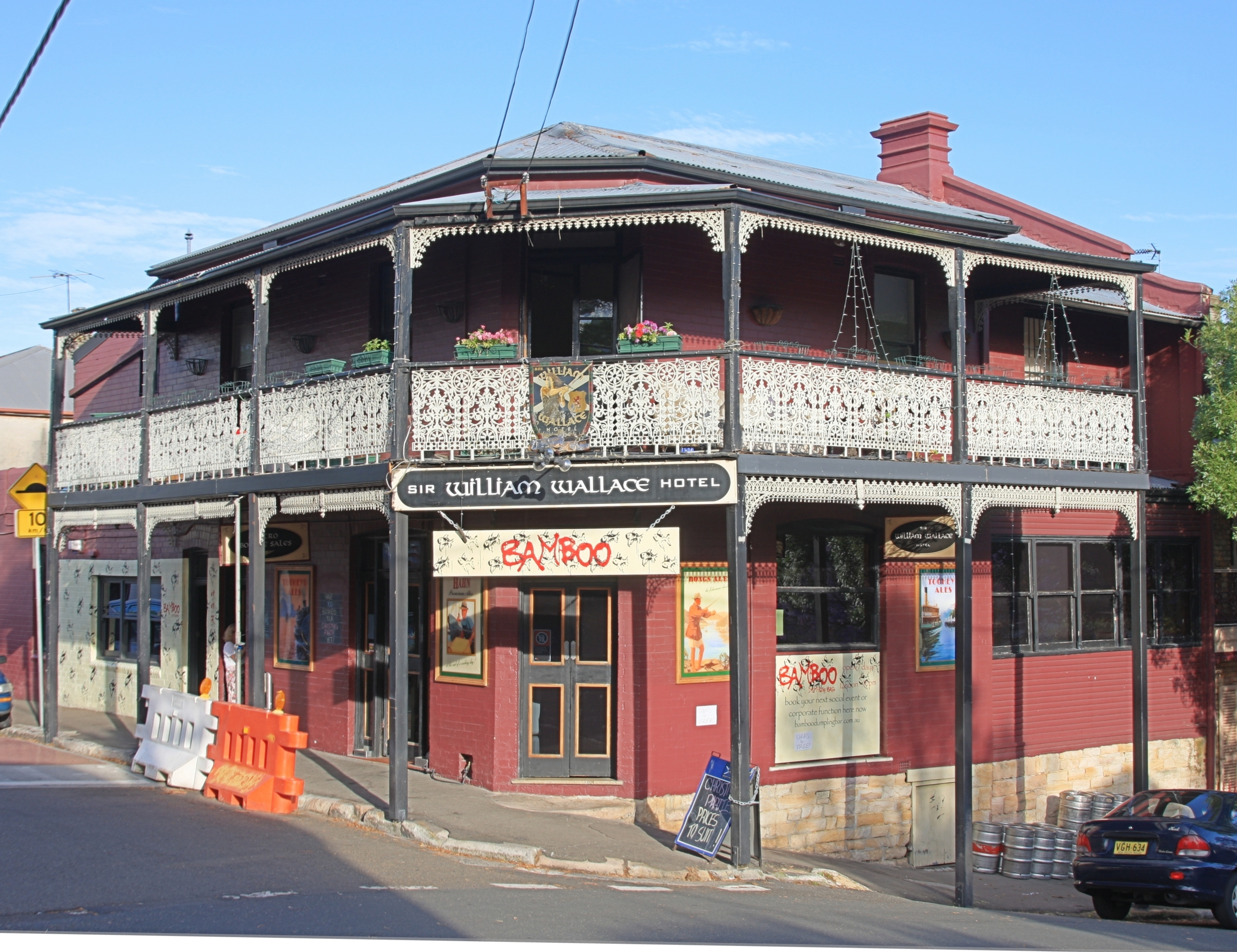
Sir William Wallace Hotel, Cameron Street

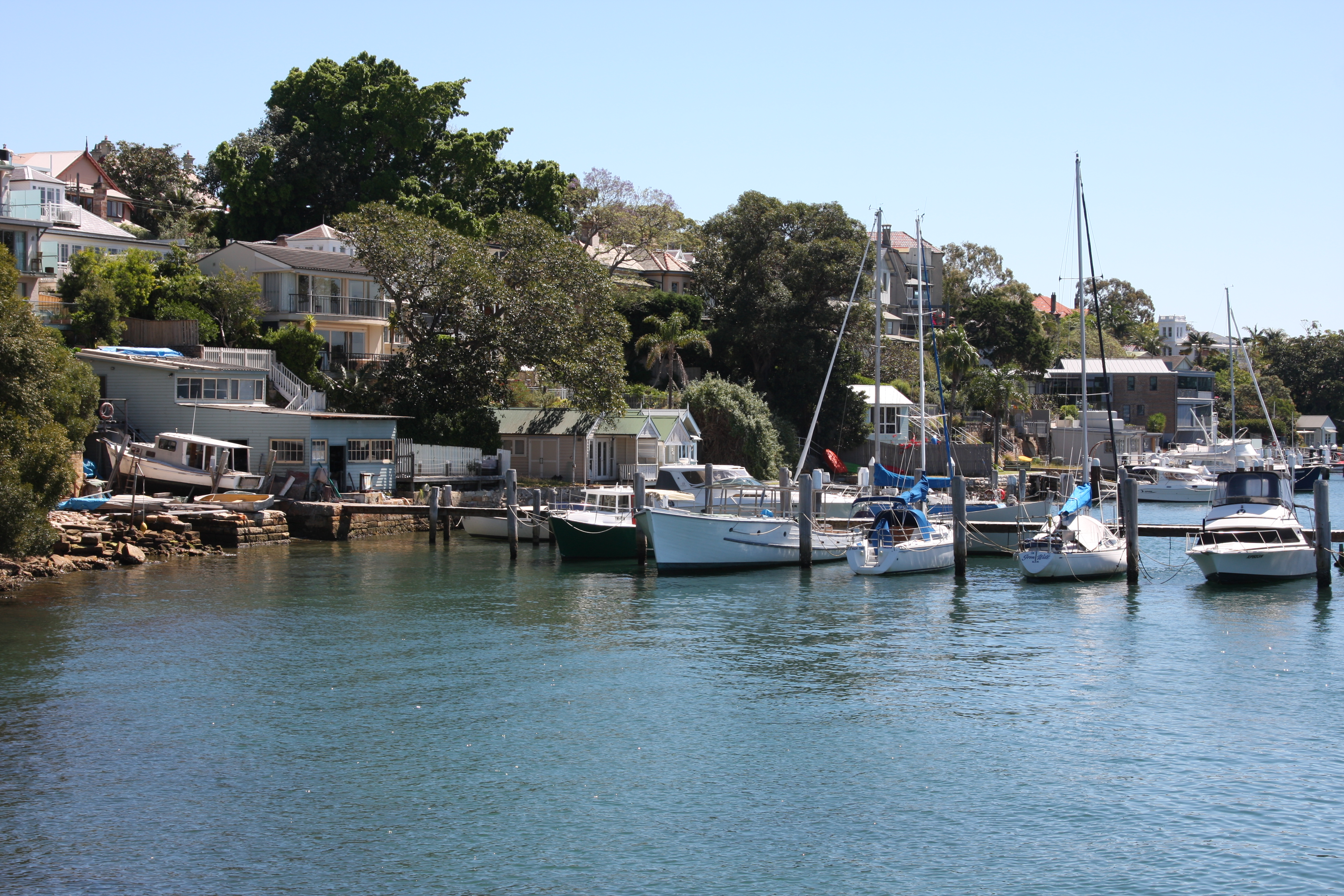
Houses overlooking Snails Bay, Birchgrove (Wharf Road)

In the 2021 census of Population and Housing, there were 3,228 people in Birchgrove. Of these 47.9% were male and 52.1% were female, with a median age of 46 years. 69.1% of people were born in Australia. The next most common countries of birth were England 10.0% and New Zealand 2.4%. 87.9% of people only spoke English at home. The most common responses for religion in Birchgrove were No Religion 52.4%, Catholic 20.4% and Anglican 11.5%.

Birchgrove's population is typically wealthy, with a median weekly household income of $3,603, compared with $1,746 in Australia. The most common types of occupation for employed persons were Professionals 47.1%, Managers 26.2%, Clerical and Administrative Workers 9.9% and Community and Personal Service Workers 4.9%. Of all households, 72.7% were family households and 25.2% were single person households.

Birchgrove has the highest proportion (17%) of citizens holding a postgraduate degree of any Sydney suburb.

=== Notable residents ===
- Yvonne Barrett – pop singer
- Bryan Brown – actor and partner of actor, director and model Rachel Ward
- Rhonda Burchmore – actress and singer
- Judy Davis – actress and partner of actor Colin Friels
- Charles Fraser – rugby league player
- Nicholas Miklouho-Maclay – explorer, ethnologist, anthropologist and biologist (25 Wharf Road, Birchgrove, NSW, Australia)
- Lyall Wall – cricketer and rugby league player
- David Williamson – playwright

== Schools ==
- Birchgrove Public School

== Churches ==
- St John's Anglican Church

== Notes ==
1. Postcode 2041 covers the suburbs of Balmain, Balmain East and Birchgrove.
