= Wyoming, Birchgrove =

Australian heritage-listed residence

Wyoming
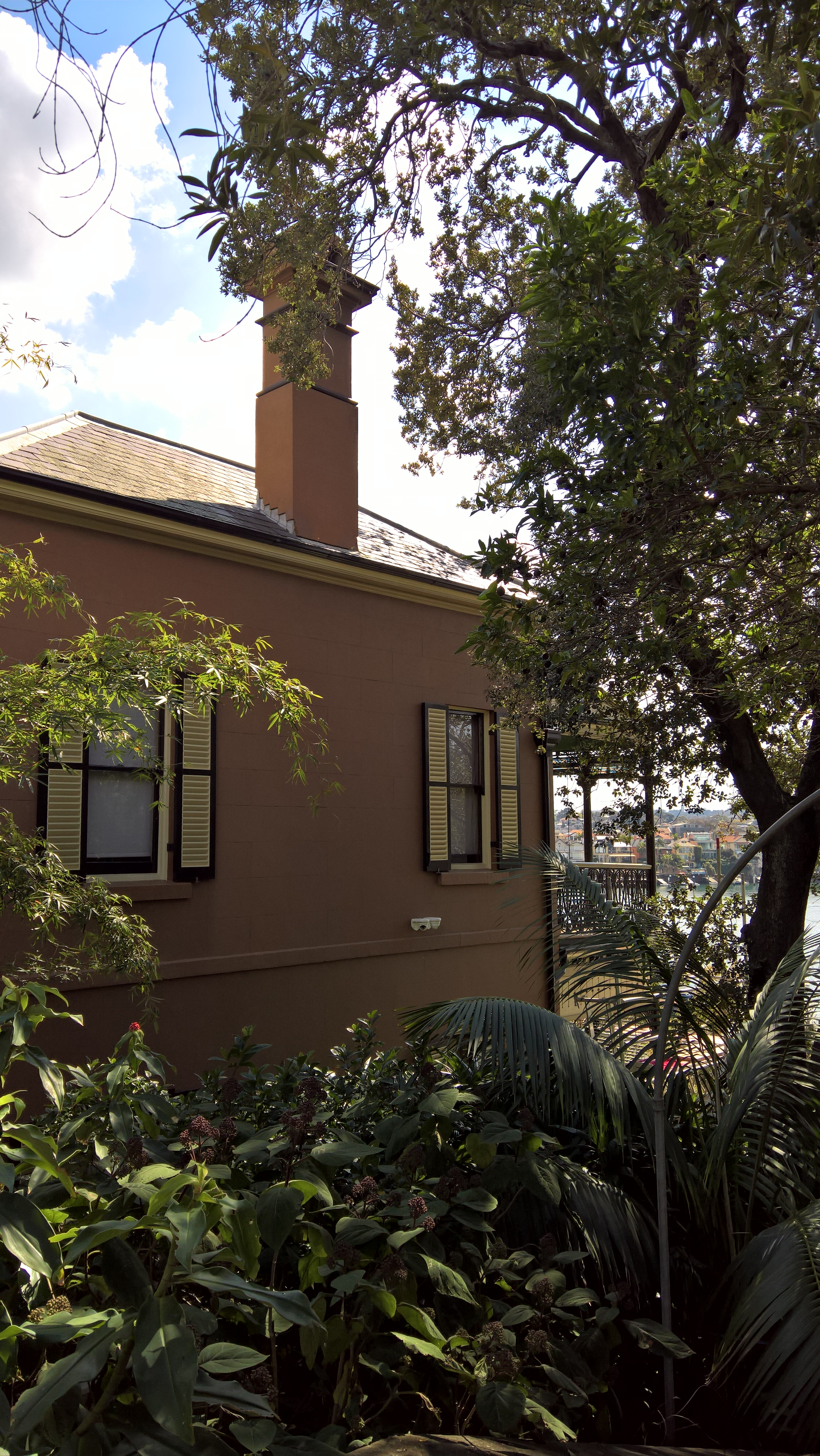
- Wyoming, Birchgrove

- Location within Sydney Location within Australia
- 33.8510°S 151.1855°E
- Location: 25 Wharf Road, Birchgrove, New South Wales, Australia

New South Wales Heritage Register
- Official name: Wyoming
- Type: state heritage (built)
- Designated: 2 April 1999
- Reference no.: 772
- Type: Other - Residential Buildings (private)
- Category: Residential buildings (private)

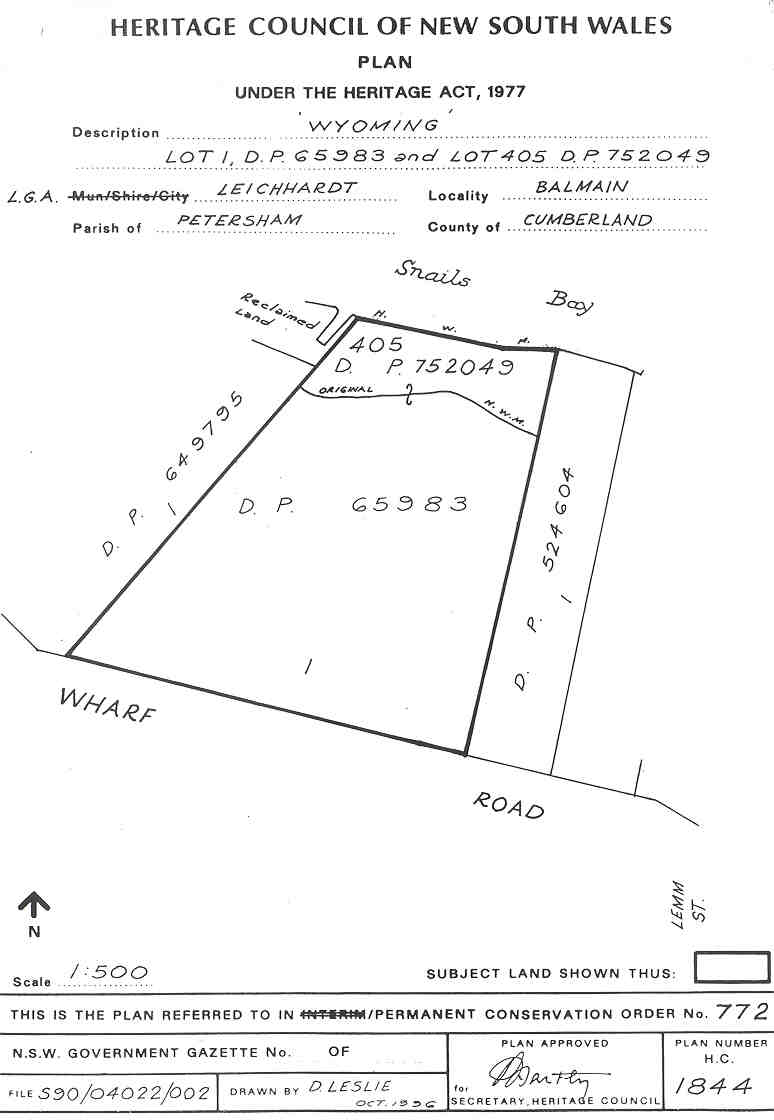
Heritage boundaries

Wyoming is a heritage-listed residence at 25 Wharf Road, Birchgrove, New South Wales, Australia. It was added to the New South Wales State Heritage Register on 2 April 1999 and the former Register of the National Estate on 28 May 1996.

== History ==
Wyoming was built by Quarton L. Deloitte in 1881, around an earlier stone cottage, "The Hermitage", which had been home in the 1870s to shipwright James Yeend. Yeend ran his yard below, and its wharf was almost certainly the original of Wharf Road. Wyoming was designed by Mansfield Bros., a pre-eminent Victorian firm who designed many public buildings, including Balmain Primary School and Royal Prince Alfred Hospital.

Deloitte was son of a sea captain who had grown up in nearby Birch Grove House. He was secretary of the Colonial Sugar Refinery for 50 years. Deloitte was a prominent citizen of Balmain, patron of Sydney Rowing Club for decades and often referred to as the father of rowing. His family was associated with Birchgrove (and Wharf Road in particular) for nearly 100 years. Deloitte was a keen gardener, terracing the steep site and laying out lawns, trees, shrubs and a glass house.

In Deloitte's absence in 1884 Wyoming was tenanted by legendary Russian scientist, explorer and humanist, Nicholas Miklouho-Maclay (1846-1888) with his wife Margaret, daughter of five-times Premier of New South Wales John Robertson. Although little-known in Australia, Miklouho-Maclay is revered as a folk hero in Russia and Ukraine. The property became the focus of international attention for its association with Miklouho-Maclay, who established the biological research station at Watsons Bay (entered in the Register of the National Estate) and was responsible for anthropological and exploration activity in New Guinea and the Solomon Islands.

When Deloitte died in 1927, Wyoming was quickly absorbed by the adjacent maritime industry of Nicholson Brothers and later Stannards Brothers. Set below the street it was soon forgotten and neglected.

In 1989 it was threatened with demolition as part of redundant Balmain maritime industry; its owners wanted to replace it with 10 town houses and others in front of Nos. 21 & 23. Leichhardt Council's meeting considering the application was addressed by Soviet Consul General, Ivan Shchbakov. The meeting was filmed and shown on television in the Soviet Union and reported in Pravda. A usually then-divided Leichhardt Municipal Council passed a unanimous motion to reject the application and requested a State Government demolition prevention order, which was accepted, followed by NSW State Heritage Register listing.

In 1994 a conservation management plan was prepared for the owners by Clive Lucas, Stapleton & Partners and used as the basis for restoring the house. Work began in 1994. Clive Lucas, Stapleton & Partners and particularly Ian Stapleton left his signature with creation of a conservatory-kitchen, added to the original stone-flagged scullery. The house was converted to a single residence by removing the flats' many kitchens and bathrooms and closed-in verandahs, which were re-opened. This left original fabric mostly intact. Evidence of the flats and maritime industry era survive in retained large power board, cabling, letter boxes and wire front fence.

Historic photos by Harold Cazneaux in a 1929 Australian Home Beautiful magazine article were an invaluable guide to multiple discoveries: original iron lacework identified when a waterfront burn-off was approved by the EPA; first floor verandah posts that'd become part of an arbor; parts of finials and a ridge capping of the Orchid house found lying around. Others were made: a network of hexagonal drainage channels in the Orchid house floor; the original well described in an 1868 advertisement as "never-failing spring well" under the main verandah floor and the 1850s stone flagging under a flat's floor and in the scullery.

Heritage consultant James Broadbent advised on contemporary wallpaper, furniture and soft furnishings.

Restoration of the Victorian garden began in 1999. Heritage landscape architect Michael Lehany designed the garden around the house in 2000. He created in front of the house an intricate Victorian garden, including the cactus garden, before they became a necessity due to water restrictions. Previous existing but deteriorated structures were copied, stone balustrades and other fixtures and paths were re-laid or restored. Extensive traditional planting was undertaken by the owners to augment what survived.

The woven wire arbors were copied from one surviving, the stone balustrades were restored and old concrete steps and paths repaired and re-laid. The structure of the old garden was re-affirmed before being overlaid, or furnished, with rich and varied - but traditional - planting. This reflects both Deloitte's and the present owners' horticultural interests: orchids, cacti and succulents, bamboos and in particular, frangipanis. A surviving tree near the street is an evergreen, or holly or holm oak, Quercus ilex from the Mediterranean. Others were several varied frangipanis and a tree gardenia.

The early dock had been closed in with Moruya granite, cut-offs from the Sydney Harbour Bridge. It was restored in c. 2000: this part in granite; the rest in large sandstone blocks.

The new garden on the waterfront below the retaining wall was designed by James Broadbent and has been largely constructed and planted in 2011. The 1850s seawall was derelict.

Deloitte, an avid orchid collector, built the Victorian Orchid house, a rare survivor on Sydney harbour. It required extensive restoration. Imported as a prefabricated structure from England, it would have proven unsuited for orchids other than tropical ones. He then built the waterfront fernery (replacing shipyard sheds) with a massive vaulted roof of slats on a brick plinth. Only the plinth remained. The 1904 sewer installation sadly had to go through the back of the fernery. Although care was obviously taken, the works and especially the resultant rubble greatly downgraded the area. The roof eventually became ruinous and was removed. With little known of the fernery's detail and nothing of the planting of this lower area, no attempt has been made to re-create any form of "period" garden. Rather its location and aspect have been embraced, after removing decades-worth of rubbish and weeds. For shade a pergola was built in ironbark saplings, wire and split bamboo, beneath the retaining wall. The simplicity is deceptive: as everything, bulldozers, machines, stone, rubbish, weeds and soil, had to be taken in and out by barge.

In World War II, the stub wall was filled in with soil so enabling a veggie patch to be created. This has been reinstated. The dock survived in a vestigial form: today it is a bog garden.

== Description ==
Wyoming is a large, two-storey rendered brick, Italianate style residence, with a c. 1900 rendered brick and corrugated asbestos cement roof addition at the rear, and several subsequent inferior additions. It is an excellent example of a Victorian Italianate waterfront villa. It also features a large garden. The building and garden contribute to the townscape value of the area and can be viewed from the water.

The exterior of Wyoming features a slate roof with tile hips and ridges and distinctive chimneys. The interiors consist of a typical Victorian four square plan with a central stairway, connected to a two-storey staff wing. The main roof is titled in slate with terracotta ridging, while the staff wing roof is terra cotta tiled. The main house has a projecting bay at its east end and a projecting tower like room at its west end. The front northern elevation is covered with original timber and cast iron verandah, since enclosed and converted to bathrooms, kitchens, bedrooms etc.

The garden features native trees, and is bordered by a cast iron gate and gate posts. A glass house, which was largely derelict for many years, was reconstructed in the 1990s, at which time the garden underwent sympathetic replanting.

=== Modifications and dates ===
- Verandahs infilled, interesting later addition to street side. Stucco - Ashlar.
- Windows modified.
- Entry lobby and rear complete stair (top newell missing), tesselated tiles, single storey.
- Verandah with cast iron columns stone steps from verandah, sea walls (top course rebuilt in smaller stones).
- Extensive restoration program underway since 1995 with Ian Stapleton advising

== Significance ==
The combination of Wyoming's architectural qualities, its contextual impact, its degree of intactness and its historical associations make the villa a building of considerable cultural significance at the local, state and national level. This is one of the last waterfront Victorian villas remaining on the Balmain Peninsula. Architecturally, it is a fine example of the Italianate style, having been designed by the Mansfield Brothers, who were perhaps Sydney's pre-eminent mid Victorian architects. The villa has landmark qualities to Snails Bay and to Sydney Harbour. It has streetscape significance to Wharf Road and retains its original Victorian curtilage with a remnant garden. It has local significance for its association with Quarton Deloitte, known for his contribution to the local area and a pioneer in Australian rowing. It has state and international significance for its association with the eminent Russian scientist and humanitarian, Nicolai Miklouho-Maclay.
