= Balmain Colliery =

Coal mine in Sydney, Australia

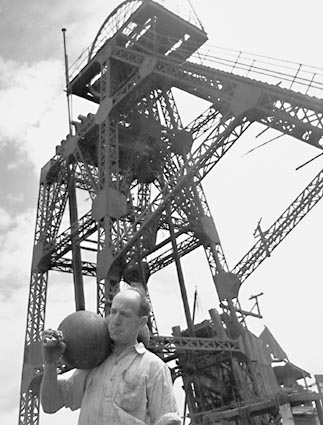
- Balmain Colliery, Birthday Shaft, c. 1940s

- Location in greater Sydney
- Location: Birchgrove, Inner western Sydney, New South Wales, Australia; 33°51′09″S 151°10′40″E
- Products: Coal; Natural gas
- Greatest depth: 2,900 feet (880 m)
- Opened: 1897
- Closed: 1945
- Company: Sydney Harbour Collieries (1895–96); Harbour Collieries Co. (1896–1931); Natural Gas & Oil Corporation Ltd (1932–55)

Balmain Colliery was a coal mine located in Birchgrove in the inner-west of Sydney, in the state of New South Wales, Australia. It produced coal from 1897 until 1931 and natural gas from 1937 to 1950. At approximately 800 metres (2,600 ft) in depth, it remains the deepest coal mine ever to have been sunk in Australia.

== Location ==
The colliery was located on the northern side of the Balmain Peninsula, on the corner of Birchgrove Road and Water Street, next to Birchgrove Public School.

== History ==
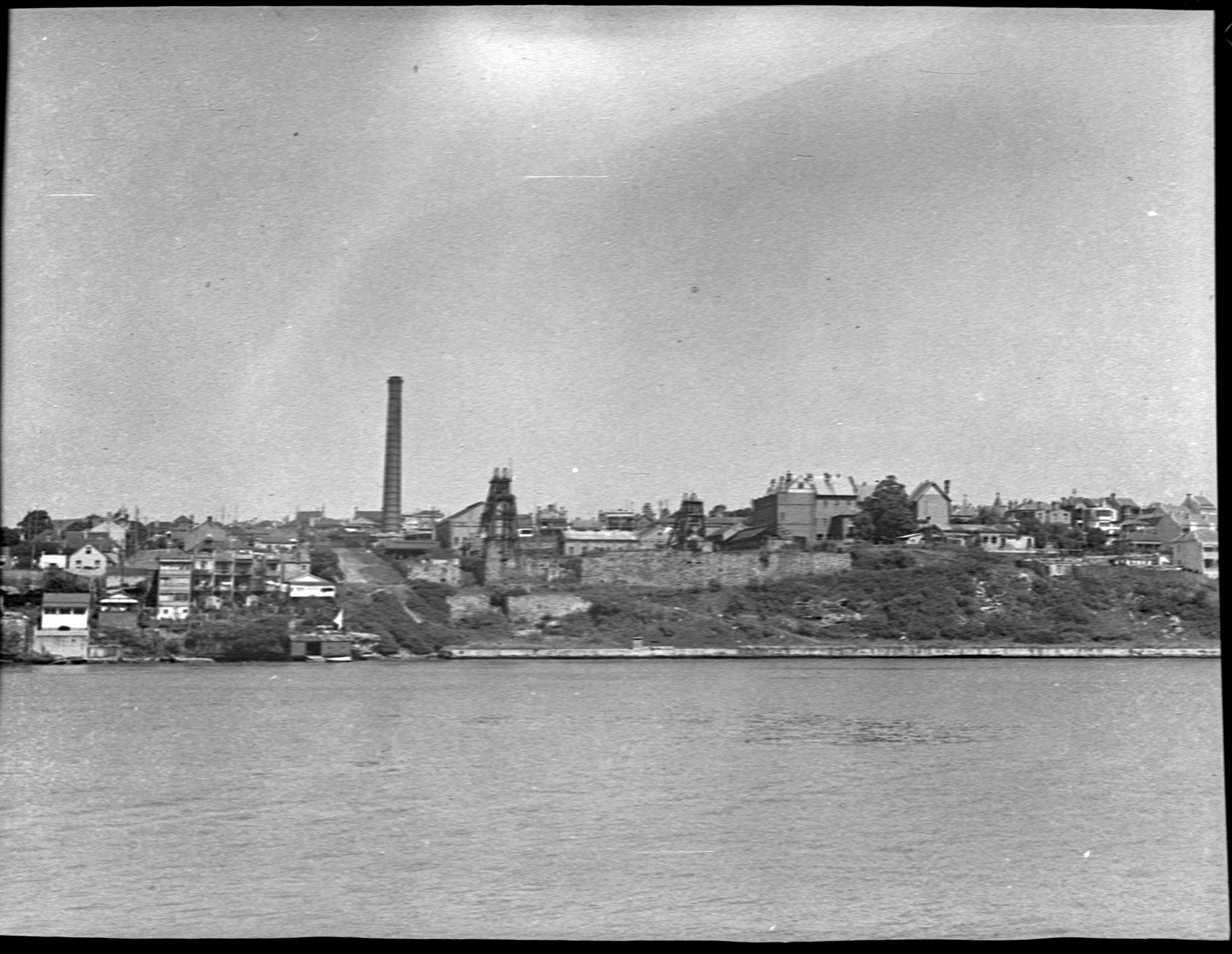
Balmain Colliery (date unknown; within period 1925–1957)

The presence of coal was confirmed in 1891 with bores at Birchgrove and Cremorne Point. Permission to mine from the Department of Mines was granted in 1894 with another parcel of land between Rose Bay and Vaucluse also applied for in 1895. Sydney Harbour Collieries (Limited) started the mine, however the company was wound up in 1896; and the mine was bought by the Harbour Collieries Co.

Two shafts, named Birthday and Jubilee, were sunk between 1897 and 1902.

The mine produced coal from 1897 to 1915 and from 1924 to 1931, and methane (natural gas) from 1937 to 1950. A report of 1948 concluded that although the mine was still producing gas, the rate had fallen to a level consistent with a depleted gas field.

== Mining accidents ==
Prior to 1900, there were six fatalities at the mine, but little of the details are known.

From 1900, three fatal accidents occurred at the mine claiming a further ten lives:

- On 17 March 1900, six miners were being lowered down the Birthday shaft. At 434 metres (1,424 ft) the bucket they were travelling in caught on a projection, tipped over and five of the six men fell to their death in the shaft. As a result of this accident, the Mining Act was amended to provide guide rails in shafts to prevent bucket swinging or overturning.
- On 23 January 1933, a year after the mine closed, two men were killed in a gas explosion while preparing a drilling site on the 2900' level for an exploratory drill hole to locate methane gas. The coroner concluded that one of the miners struck a match to light his pipe and caused the explosion.
- During the sealing of the Birthday Shaft on 20 April 1945, a rudimentary test was being undertaken which ignited escaping gas and caused an explosion below the seal. The company manager and two men were killed in the accident and another two men injured.

== Remnants ==
The site is now occupied by the Hopetoun Quays residential complex. A plaque commemorates the former colliery and its workers.

Photographs of the Balmain Colliery are held in the collections of the National Library of Australia and the State Library of Victoria.

== See also ==
- Mining in Australia
- Coal in Australia

== Sources ==
- Reynolds, Peter (1986). The coal mine under the harbour. Architectural History Unit, University of New South Wales.
- Solling, Max; Reynolds, Peter L (1997). Leichhardt : on the margins of the city : a social history of Leichhardt and the former municipalities of Annandale, Balmain and Glebe. Allen & Unwin. ISBN 978-1-86448-408-3.
- Lawrence, Joan; Warne, Catherine (1995). A pictorial history of Balmain to Glebe. Kingsclear Books. ISBN 978-0-908272-40-2.
- "Balmain's own coal mine" (PDF). NSW Department of Primary Industries. February 2007. Primefact 556, 2007.
- "ACTS OF PARLIAMENT ASSENTED TO". Government Gazette of the State of New South Wales. No. 142. New South Wales, Australia. 7 November 1924. p. 5087 – via National Library of Australia.
