= Balmain Sailing Club =

Sailing club in the Municipality of Leichhardt, Sydney

Coordinates: 33°51′06″S 151°10′40″E

- Burgee
- Founded: 1885
- Based in: Balmain, New South Wales
- Website: www.balmainsailingclub.com

Balmain Sailing Club is a sailing club in Inner West Council local government area of Sydney, in the state of New South Wales, Australia.

The club currently has approximately 300 members and races a keelboat fleet and a dinghy fleet. The club runs a full racing calendar throughout the year, with Summer, Winter and Spring series, along with Summer Twilights (pre- and post-Christmas) and a number of non point-score races. Keelboat fleet races are organised across 4 divisions, with entrants from clubs across the western harbour area on Sundays, and as another 4 divisions in the Friday Twilight Series during summer. The dinghy fleet races in two divisions.

== Location ==
The club is located in Water Street on the northern side of the Balmain Peninsular in the suburb of Birchgrove, with water-front access directly into Sydney Harbour

== History ==
The club was originally formed in 1885. After a long period of little activity, the club was re-formed in 1995.

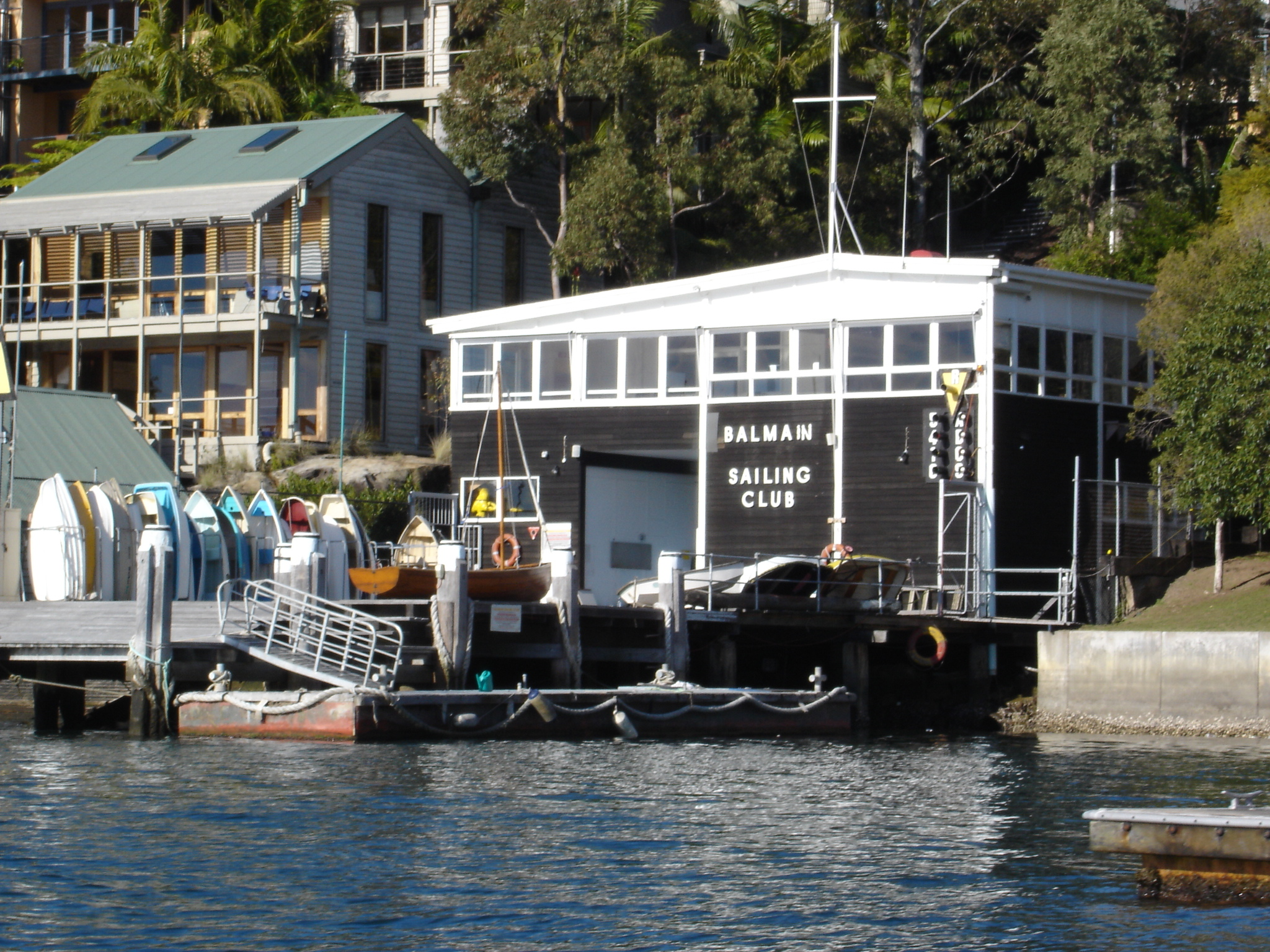
Balmain Sailing Club

== Balmain Regatta ==
The club hosts the annual Balmain Regatta, which is claimed to be the oldest in Australia, on the last Sunday in October each year. The event was first held in 1849 and ran continuously until the outbreak of World War I. With the revival of the club in the 1990s, the regatta restarted in 1996 and has run annually ever since.

The event includes classic 18- and 10-foot skiff, dinghy and yacht races and is a celebration of the local community connection with Sydney Harbour and the local boat-building industry.

== Board of directors ==
As of 2020–2021:

- Commodore: Campbell Reid
- Vice-Commodore / Race Director: Alan Gregory
- Secretary: Colin Grove
- Treasurer: Ed Tacey
- Director: Conrad Johnston
- Director: Ray Miller
- Director: Chantelle Hodgson
- Director: Mike West
