= Raywell, Birchgrove =

Raywell
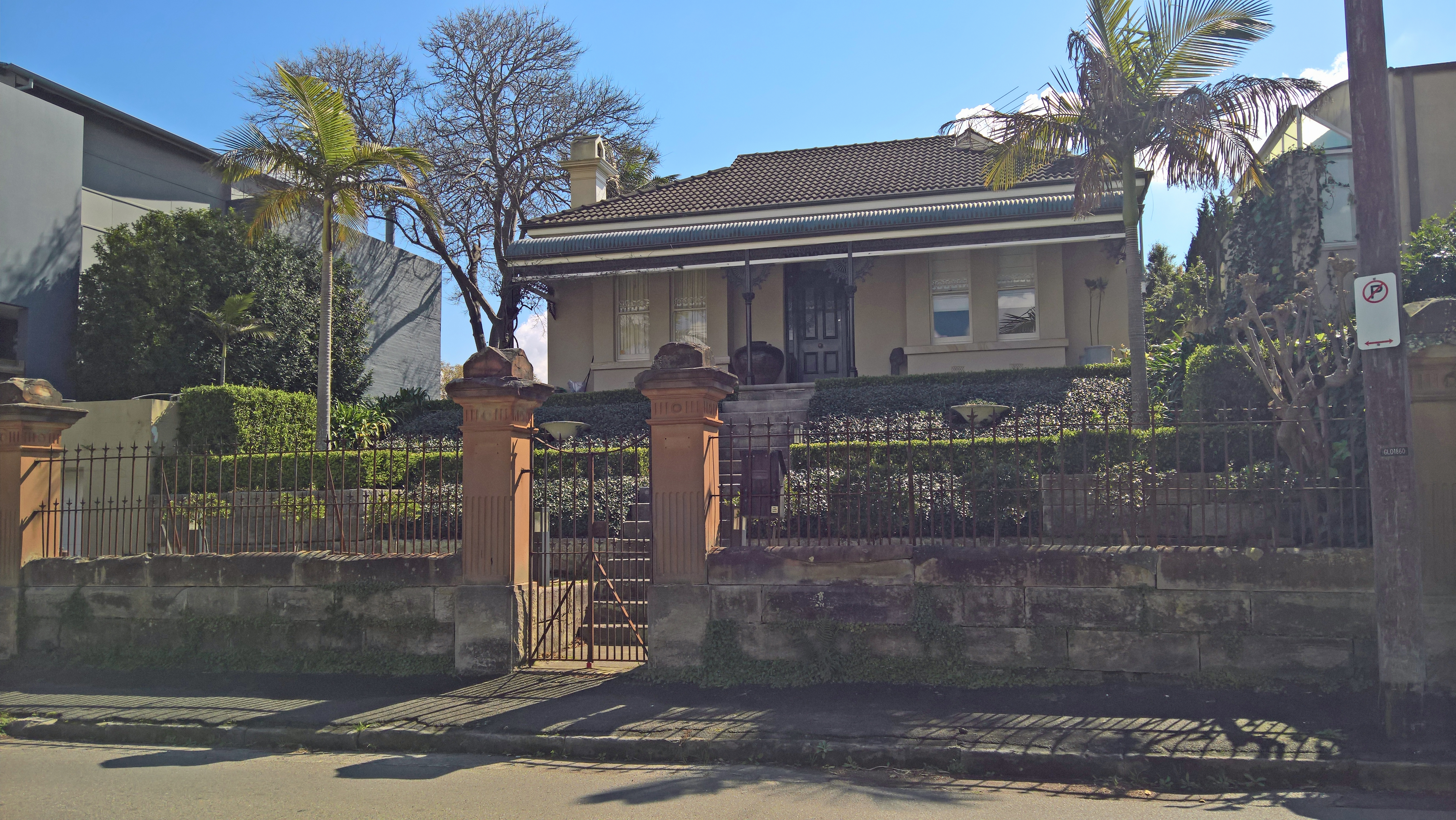
- Raywell in 2019

- Location within Sydney Location within Australia
- 33.8467°S 151.1850°E
- Location: 144 Louisa Road, Birchgrove, Inner West Council, Sydney, New South Wales, Australia

New South Wales Heritage Register
- Official name: Raywell; Carnegie House
- Type: state heritage (built)
- Designated: 2 April 1999
- Reference no.: 93
- Type: House
- Category: Residential buildings (private)

Raywell is a heritage-listed residence at 144 Louisa Road, Birchgrove, Inner West Council, Sydney, New South Wales, Australia. It is also known as Carnegie House. It was added to the New South Wales State Heritage Register on 2 April 1999.

== History ==
The Birchgrove section of the Balmain peninsula was known to the Wangal as Yur(r)ulbin or "swift running waters". It is referred to as "waters meet" as it is where Port Jackson's waters meet the Parramatta River at the harbour's narrowest.

In 1796, 30 acres were granted to George Whitfield, a private in the New South Wales Corps, resulting in "Whitfield's Farm", later "Birch Grove" and "Birchgrove", which was excluded from William Balmain's large 1800 grant of the surrounding area. In 1810, it passed to John Birch, paymaster of the 73rd (Macquarie's) Regiment, who then built Birch Grove House, the focus of what was subsequently known as the Birch Grove Estate. It was sold and tenanted by a number of people thereafter. In 1860, it was subdivided by Didier Joubert; however, it was largely unsuccessful, only selling seven allotments in six years. The subdivision was later altered by a new consortium of Archibald McLean, Thomas McGregor, and Lancelot Edward Threlkeld, and again put up for sale in 1878, with considerably more success.

Louisa Road is named after Joubert's wife, Numa Street for his son, Rose Street for his daughter, and Ferdinant Street for his nephew. The alignment of Louisa Road was crucial to the subdivision. It had to be aligned along the central ridge the spit to create the maximum number of lots, in a single row, with deep water access. It had also been planned not to impinge on Birch Grove House, hence the road's "bend". Birch Grove House was retained, with a summer house added, on a large waterfront block.

36 lots in the state were bought by the Government of New South Wales for the Birch Grove Recreation Ground (later Birchgrove Oval). Public concerns about pollution and health led agitation to reclaim Snail's Bay. A trust was formed in 1882, and architect Ferdinand Reuss Jnr. prepared a plan of landscaped gardens, walks, shrubbery and "big oval cricket ground". Reclamation reduced Birch Grove House's garden, but improved the area. The park was fenced in 1884 and had a practice cricket pitch by 1885. By 1887 a dyke wall was formed to reclaim the swamp. In that year the caretaker, Thomas Rose, a man of "horticultural experience" and two men continued laying out the grounds. The 1890s depression halted work, which resumed in 1897. By 1904 a tennis pavilion and grandstand stood. Other estate subdivisions followed in 1900 and 1911. Today, huge Bay figs (Ficus macrophylla) frame the oval and give some sense of a former landscape estate, although Birch Grove House was demolished in 1967.

The house subsequently known as Raywell was built on what was Lot 25, Section 7 of the Birch Grove subdivision, bought by auctioneer and former Mayor of Balmain Albert Elkington in 1882. He sold the property to Duncan Smith in July 1883, who built the house c. 1883. Smith sold the house in 1885 to produce merchant and commission agent R. William Ainsworth. It became known as "Raywell" during the occupancy of spinster, Rachel Cole Wells who lived there from 1888 to 1928.

Raywell was purchased by Margaret Euphemia (Pheme) and Catherine (Kate) Lycette in April 1930 who resided here with their husbands George and Norman and other members of the family over the following years. During their ownership, the slate-roofed dwelling was painted a maroon colour. There was a large Morton Bay Fig tree on the side of the house, hedge along the front fence and ornamental palms in front of the verandah. The front and back verandahs were tiled and when the house was extended at the back (sometime prior to 1945) the back verandah was converted to a passage with a bathroom at each end. The garden at the back of the house extended to the waterfront. The Lycett family retained ownership until 1960.

It was later converted to flats at an unknown date.

In 1979 discussions were held proposing the demolition of Raywell. An Interim Heritage Order was placed over the property on 7 September 1979. In 1980 a new owner purchased the property and supported the making of a Permanent Conservation Order which was gazetted on 1 May 1981. The item was transferred to the State Heritage Register on 2 April 1999.

The new owner also set about restoring the property and converting the units back into a single residence. The expansive restoration project included restoring existing fireplaces, windows, architraves, skirtings and doors, restoring the north and east verandah and cast iron balustrade, replacing the stair with new cedar staircase following original location, enlarging the northern window in bedroom 1 on the first floor to match style of window below it on ground floor, installing three new bathrooms, providing a new kitchen in the north-west wing and installing a new northern window and doors, and providing an open air car parking space in south-west corner of site.

In 1987, it underwent further alterations to the first floor front interior of the rear wing of the building. In 1993, it received heritage approval to relocate the garage and a substantial garage was created on the south west corner while retaining the line of the main level of the house.

== Description ==
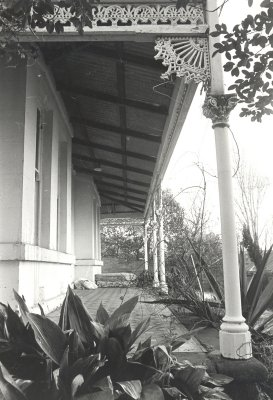
View along the verandah

Raywell is a classical single storey Victorian period residence of bungalow form dating from c. 1883 with a later two-storey Victorian addition of terrace style house form on the north side.

It is sited prominently on the ridge of Long Nose point with sweeping harbour frontage and views spanning from the West towards the Gladesville Bridge, Hunters Hill, Cockatoo Island and Woolwich, North East towards Berry Island Reserve and to the south capturing the skyline of the City of Sydney and the Harbour Bridge. The frontage to Louisa Road is bounded by an attractive sandstone and palisade fence.

Much original interior fabric survives. Internally and at the rear the building had suffered from vandalism and its conversion into flats, but many interior details have survived and been carefully restored. The marble fireplaces were lost through theft, and have been replaced.

== Heritage listing ==
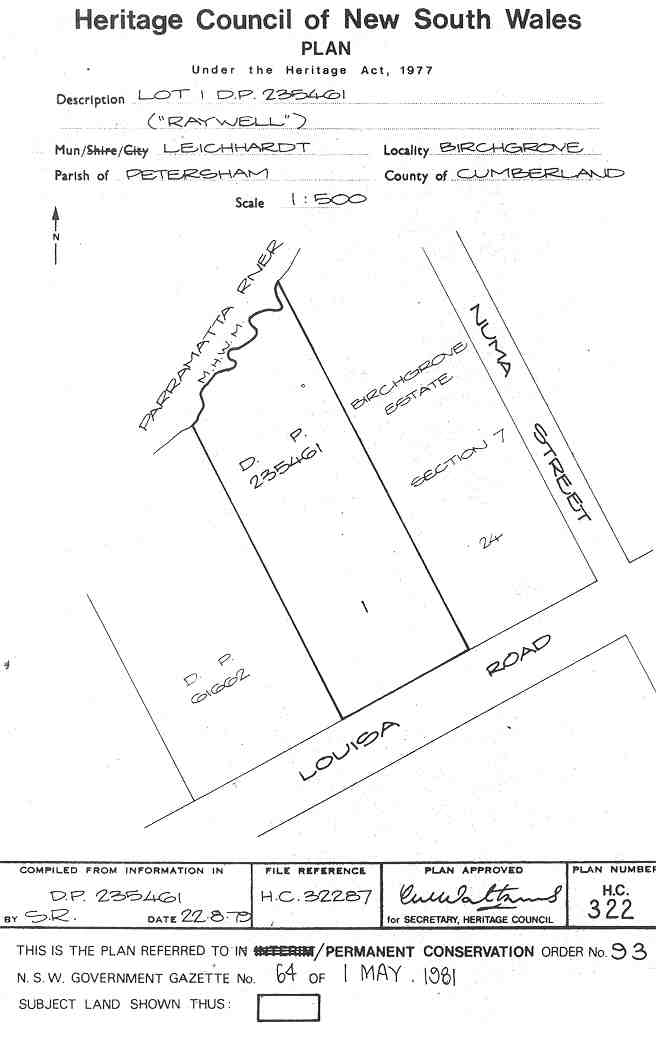
Heritage boundaries

Raywell, constructed in 1885 is a single storey Victorian period residence of bungalow form situated in a prominent position on the ridge of Long Nose Point. It is recognised as the only building with obvious architectural merit in the locality

Raywell was listed on the New South Wales State Heritage Register on 2 April 1999.
