= Nicholas Miklouho-Maclay =

Russian explorer and scientist (1846–1888)

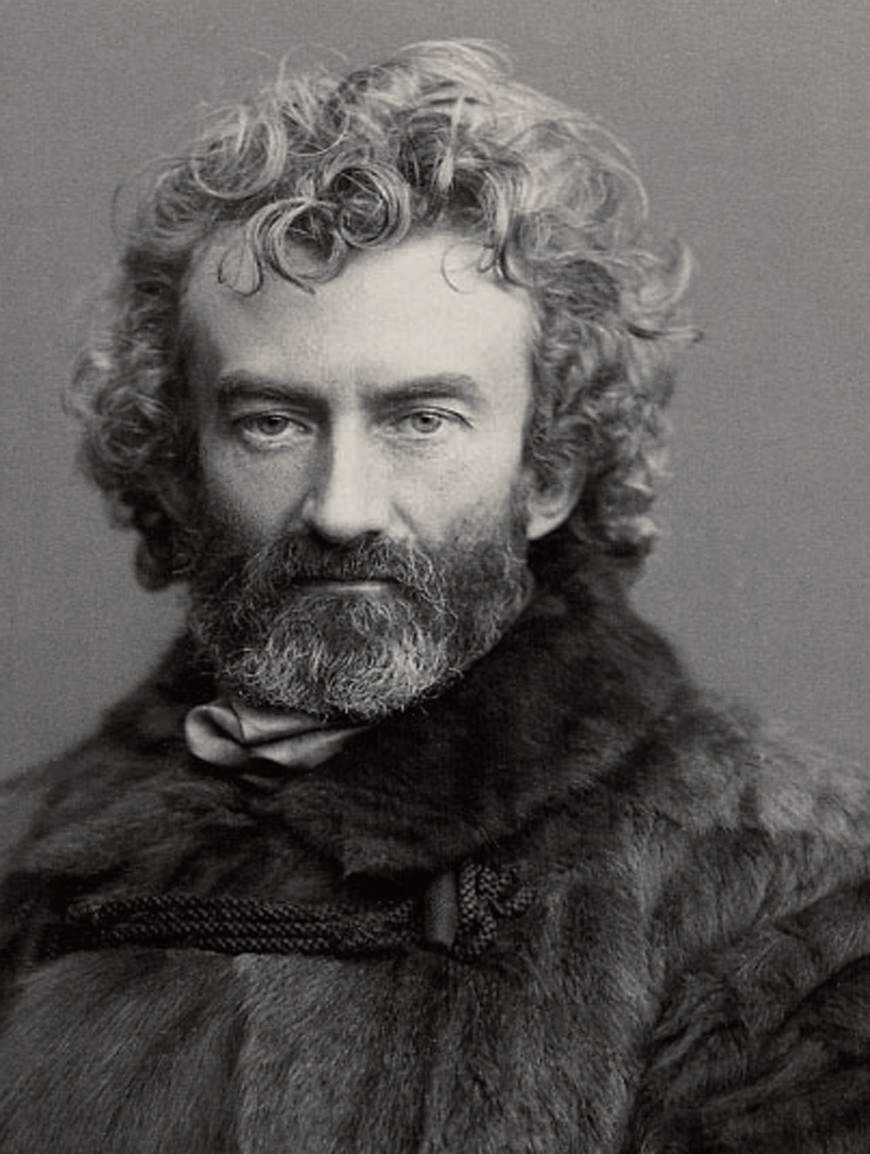
- Miklouho-Maclay, c. 1887
- Born: 17 July 1846; Rozhdestvenskoye, Russia
- Died: 14 April 1888 (aged 41); St. Petersburg, Russia
- Education: Heidelberg University; Leipzig University; Jena University
- Known for: Anthropological work in New Guinea and the Pacific
- Scientific career
- Fields: Ethnology, anthropology, biology
- Author abbrev. (botany): Mikl.-Maclay
- Author abbrev. (zoology): Miklucho-Maclay

Nicholas or Nicholai Nikolaevich Miklouho-Maclay (Note: English variations of his name include: Nikolai Nikolaevich de Miklouho-Maclay, Nicolai de Miklouho Maclay, and Baron de Miklouho-Maklai, which he used in letter writing, and others. In scientific literature, especially where he discovered sponge species, his surname is cited as Miklucho-Maclay.) (Russian: Никола́й Никола́евич Миклу́хо-Макла́й, romanized: Nikolay Nikolayevich Mikhlukho-Maklay; 17 July [O.S. 5 July] 1846 – 14 April [O.S. 2 April] 1888) was a Russian explorer and scientist. He worked as an ethnologist, anthropologist and biologist. He became famous as one of the earliest scientists to settle among and study indigenous people of New Guinea "who had never seen a European".

Miklouho-Maclay spent the major part of his life travelling and conducted scientific research in the Middle East, Australia, New Guinea, Melanesia and Polynesia. Australia became his adopted country and Sydney the hometown of his family.

He became a prominent figure of nineteenth-century Australian science and became involved in significant issues of Australian and New Guinea history. Writing letters to Australian papers, Miklouho-Maclay expressed his opposition to the labour and slave trade ("blackbirding") in Australia, New Caledonia and the Pacific, as well as his opposition to the British and German colonial expansion in New Guinea. While in Australia, he built the first biological research station in the Southern Hemisphere, was elected to the Linnean Society of New South Wales, was instrumental in establishing the Australasian Biological Association, stayed at the elite Australian Club, became the intimate of the leading amateur scientist and political figure Sir William Macleay, and married Margaret-Emma Robertson, the daughter of the Premier of New South Wales. His three grandsons have all contributed to the public life of Australia.

One of the earliest followers of Charles Darwin, Miklouho-Maclay is also remembered today as a scholar who, on the basis of his comparative anatomical research, was one of the first anthropologists to refute the prevailing view that the different races of mankind belonged to different species.

== Ancestry and early years ==
Miklouho-Maclay was born in a temporary workers' camp in Borovichsky Uyezd, Novgorod Governorate, Russia, the son of a civil engineer working on the construction of the Saint Petersburg–Moscow railway. Miklouho-Maclay was partly of Ukrainian Cossack descent. His Ukrainian father, Nikolai Ilyich Myklukha, was born in 1818, in Starodub, Chernigov Governorate, and descended from Stepan Myklukha, a Zaporozhian Cossack who was awarded the title of noble by Catherine II for his military exploits during the Russo-Turkish War of 1787–1792, which included the capture of the Ochakov fortress. His Cossack lineage was extensive and also included the Zaporizhian ataman Okhrim Myklukha, who later became the prototype of Nikolai Gogol's main character Taras Bulba. His paternal grandparents were friends of Gogol. About his origins, Miklouho-Maclay wrote:

My ancestors came originally from the Ukraine, and were Zaporogg-cossacks of the Dnieper. After the annexation of the Ukraine, Stepan, one of the family, served as sotnik (a superior Cossack officer) under General Count Rumianzoff, and having distinguished himself at the storming of the Turkish fortress of Otshakoff, was by the order of Catherine II made a noble...

Nicholai's father graduated from the Nezhin Lyceum, after which he walked all the way to Saint Petersburg, where he enrolled in the Roadway Institute of Engineering Corps. He graduated from the institute in 1840 and became an engineer assigned to work on the construction of the Moscow–Saint Petersburg Railway. After becoming the first chief of the Moskovsky passenger railway station in Saint Petersburg, Myklukha moved his family there. He died in December 1857 from tuberculosis and was survived by his wife and five children. Before his death, Myklukha was fired from his job for sending 150 rubles to Taras Shevchenko.

Nicholai's mother, Ekaterina Semenovna (née Bekker), was of German and Polish descent (her three brothers took part in the January Uprising of 1863). After 1873, the Miklouho-Maclay family purchased and lived in a country estate in Malyn, 100 kilometres (62 mi) northwest of Kiev in the Polesia region.

One of Nicholai's brothers, Sergei, became a judge in Malyn where he eventually died. Another brother, Mikhail, became a geologist. A third brother, Vladimir, was a captain of the Russian coast defense ship Admiral Ushakov and participated in the Battle of Tsushima where he perished. Both Mikhail and Vladimir were members of the Russian revolutionary organization Narodnaya Volya.

Nicholai was baptised on 21 July 1846 by priest Ioann Smirnov at the Shegrinskaya Church of Nikolaos the Wonderworker. His godfather was Alexander Ridiger, a Borovichi landowner who was a veteran of the Patriotic War of 1812 and a participant in the Battle of Borodino.

== Education and studies ==
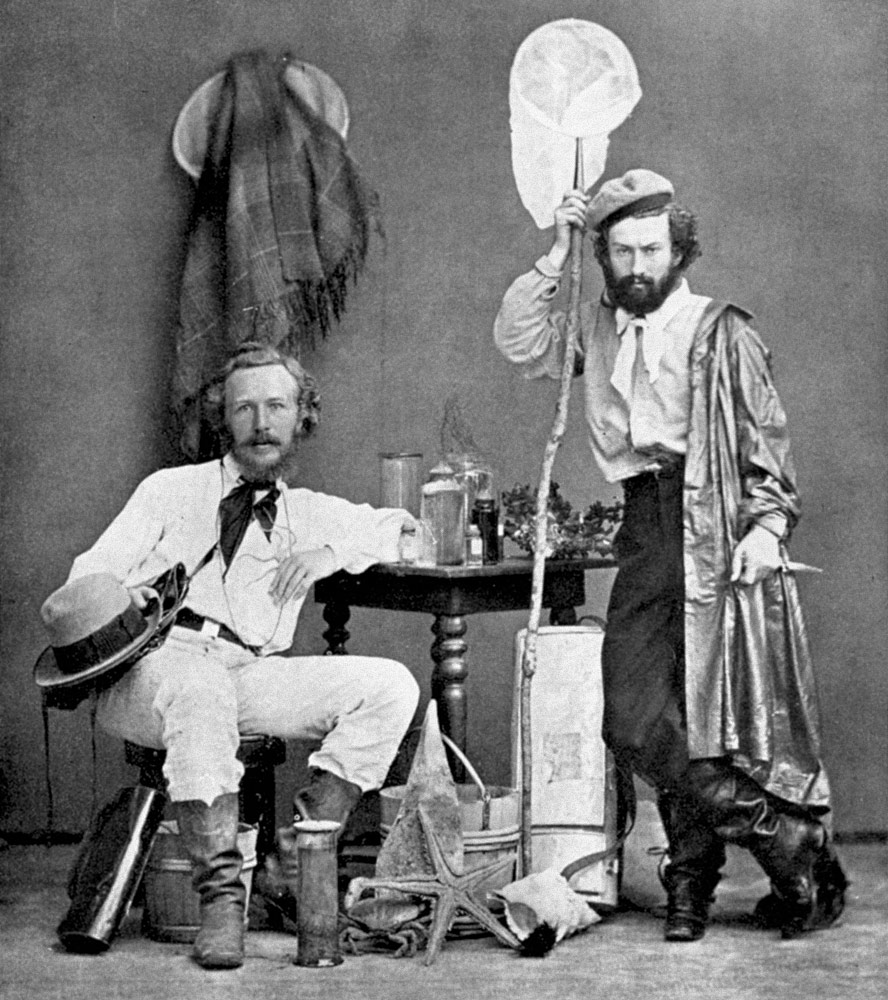
Ernst Haeckel with his assistant, Nicholai Miklouho-Maclay, in the Canary Islands, 1866

In 1858, Nicholai enrolled into the third grade of a German Lutheran school at the Saint Anna Kirche in Saint Petersburg. During his studies at the Second Saint Petersburg Gymnasium (1859–1863) along with his brother Sergei, he was arrested and kept for several days in the Peter and Paul Fortress for participating in student protests. The young students were saved by the Russian writer Aleksey Konstantinovich Tolstoy who was a friend of Nicholai's father. In 1863, without finishing the gymnasium, Nicholai enrolled as a free listener at the St. Petersburg University but only spent two months there before being expelled in February 1864 and debarred from tertiary education in Imperial Russia for "breaking the rules". In March of the same year, with a forged passport, he moved abroad to complete his studies in German universities, which provided an opportunity to study and work with leading European scientists. He studied humanities at Heidelberg, medicine at Leipzig, and zoology at the University of Jena, where he came under the influence of the great German scholar Ernst Haeckel, who had a profound influence on his future.

Miklouho-Maclay's brilliant student records attracted the attention of Haeckel, who made him his assistant as part of a field expedition to the Canary Islands in 1866. There, Miklouho-Maclay took an interest in sharks and sponges and discovered a new sponge species, which he named Guancha blanca, in tribute to the Guanches, the original Berber inhabitants of the Canary Islands. He also became a close friend of the biologist Anton Dohrn, with whom he helped conceive the idea of research stations while staying with him at Messina, Italy.

== Australia ==
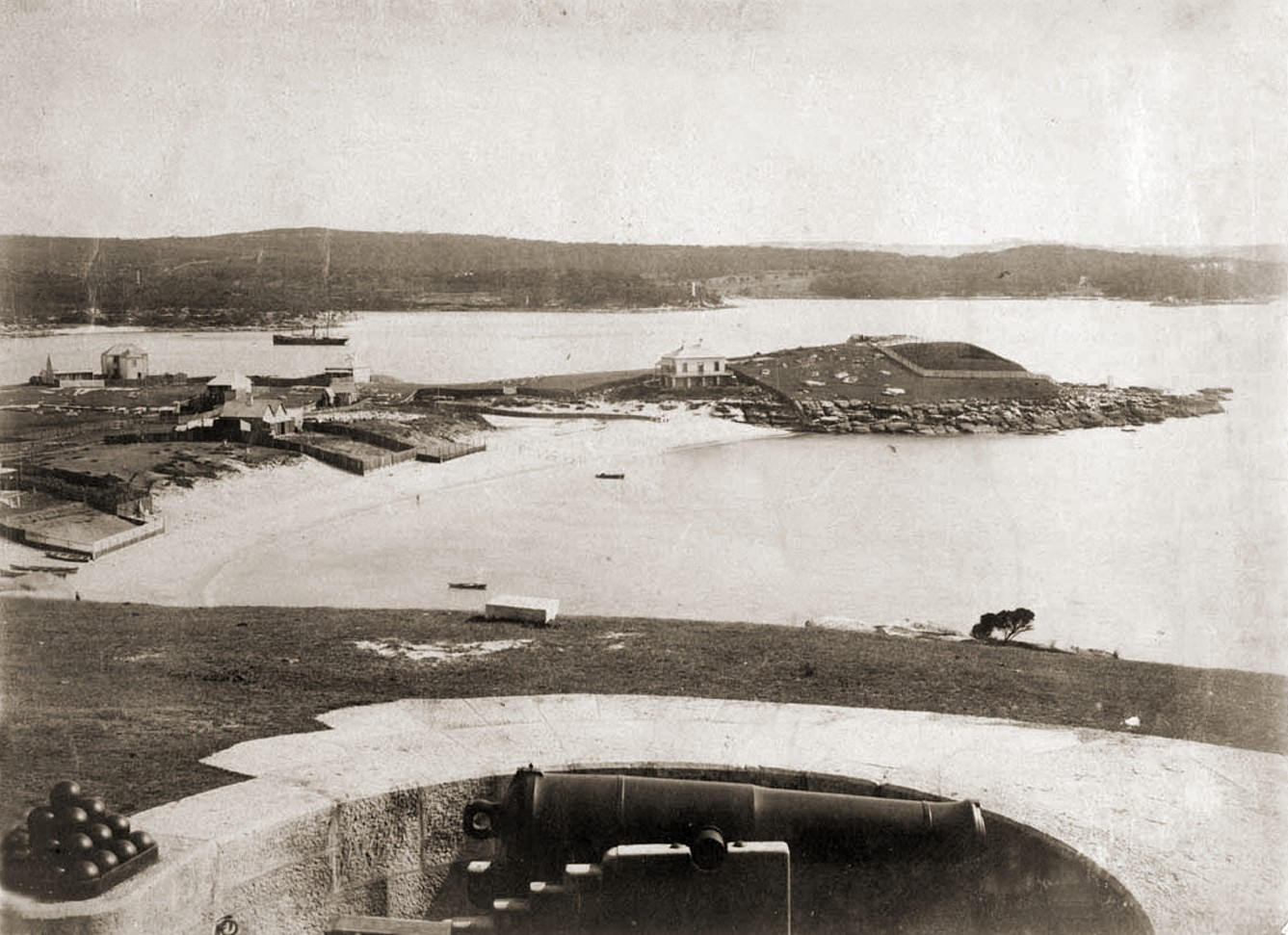
The Marine Biological Station (centre of photo) at Watson's Bay circa 1881.

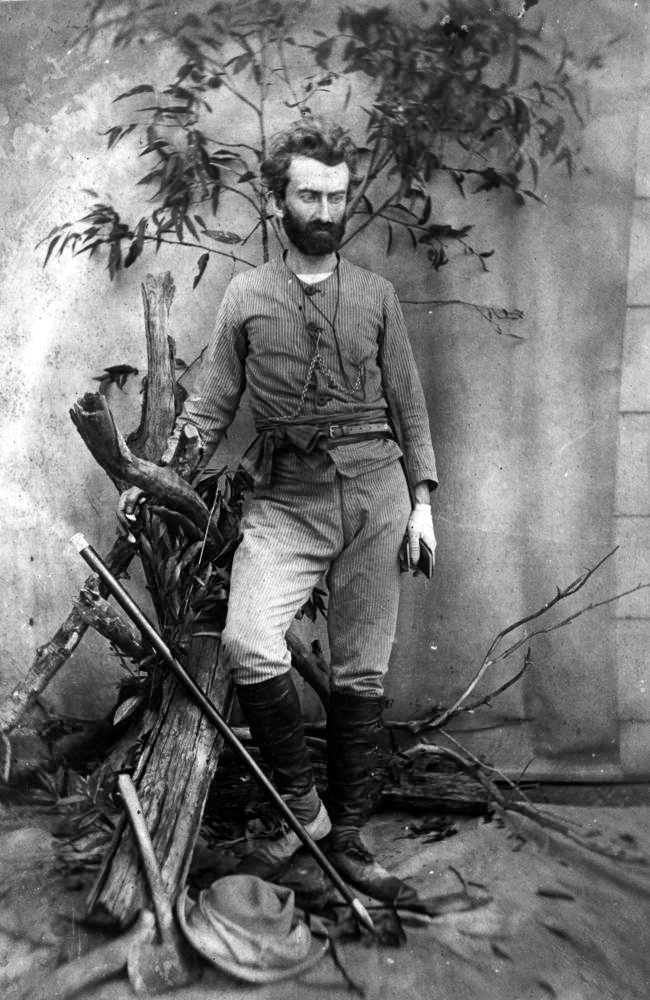
Miklouho-Maclay, ca. 1880 in Queensland, Australia. A typically posed shot from the period to emphasise the "explorer" persona — note the Eucalyptus leaves, and explorer "tools".

Miklouho-Maclay left St Petersburg for Australia on the steam corvette Vityaz. He arrived in Sydney on 18 July 1878. A few days after arriving, he approached the Linnean Society and offered to organise a zoological centre. In September 1878 his offer was approved. The centre, known as the Marine Biological Station, was constructed by prominent Sydney architect, John Kirkpatrick. This facility, located in Watsons Bay on the east side of Greater Sydney, was the first marine biological research institute in Australia. He married Margaret-Emma, widowed daughter of the Premier of New South Wales, John Robertson. His residence, named Wyoming, is in the Sydney suburb of Birchgrove, and is now heritage-listed due to its association with him.

== Anthropological work in New Guinea and the Pacific ==
Miklouho-Maclay's expedition map

Miklouho-Maclay lived in northeastern New Guinea for a two-year period in between 1871 and 1880, from which he also visited the Philippines, Malay Peninsula and Australia on a number of occasions. He returned to New Guinea again in 1883. Living amongst the native tribes, his comprehensive treatise on their way of life and customs was invaluable to later researchers.

== Anthropological views ==
In scientific and anthropological circles during the 1850s and 1860s there was much discussion connected with the study of human races and the interpretation of racial peculiarities. There were some anthropologists, such as Samuel Morton, who tried to prove that not all human races were of equal worth, and that "white people" were predestined by "natural selection" to rule over the "coloured" races.

Some scientists, such as Ernst Haeckel, a teacher of the young Miklouho-Maclay, relegated what they regarded as culturally "backward" people like Papuans, Bushmen and others to the role of 'intermediate links' between Europeans and their animal ancestors. While adhering to Darwin's theory of evolution, Miklouho-Maclay diverged from these concepts, and it was this question that led him to gather scientific facts and to study the dark-skinned inhabitants of New Guinea. On the basis of his comparative anatomical research, Miklouho-Maclay was one of the first anthropologists to refute polygenism, the view that the different races of mankind belonged to different species.

You were the first to demonstrate beyond question by your experience that man is man everywhere, that is, a kind, sociable being with whom communication can and should be established through kindness and truth, not guns and spirits. I do not know what contribution your collections and discoveries will make to the science for which you serve, but your experience of contacting the primitive peoples will make an epoch in the science for which I serve i.e. the science which teaches how human beings should live with one another.

— Leo Tolstoy, to N. N. Miklhouho-Maclay, September 1886

== Opposition to slavery ==
The humanist views of Miklouho-Maclay led him to campaign actively against the slave trade and against blackbirding – carried on between the islands of Melanesia and plantations in Queensland, Fiji, Samoa and New Caledonia. In November 1878 the Dutch government informed him that on his recommendations it was checking the slave traffic at Ternate and Tidore. From 1879 onwards he wrote a number of letters to Australian papers, and corresponded with Sir Arthur Gordon, High Commissioner for the Western Pacific, on protecting the land rights of his friends on the Maclay Coast of north-eastern New Guinea, and on ending the traffic in arms and intoxicants in the South Pacific.

== Ill health and death in Russia ==
In 1887 he left Australia, returned to St Petersburg to present his work to the Imperial Russian Geographical Society and took his young family with him. Miklouho-Maclay was in poor health and, despite treatment from Sergei Botkin, Miklouho-Maclay died of an undiagnosed brain tumour at 41 in St Petersburg. He was buried in the Volkovo Cemetery and left his skull to the St Petersburg Military and Medical Academy.

== Post-death ==
Miklouho-Maclay's widow returned to Sydney with their children. Until 1917 the scientist's family received an imperial Russian pension. The money was first allocated by Alexander III and then by Nicholas II. One of his sons, Alexander, married a daughter of R. E. O'Connor. His travel journals were not published until 1923, and an annotated five-volume collection of his works was published in 1953.

== Commemoration ==
=== Internationally and in science ===
Nicholai Nikolaevich Miklouho-Maclay is commemorated in the scientific name of the New Guinea tree species Planchonella maclayana, in the banana species Musa maclayi, and in the land snail species Canefriula maclayiana which were some of the species he discovered. The weevil Rhinoscapha maclayi was first collected by Miklouho-Maclay and was then named after him by his friend William Macleay.

Other species named after Nicholai Nikolaevich Miklouho-Maclay include: Colastomion maclayi (a wasp from New Guinea), and Dysmicoccus maclayi (a scale insect from New Guinea)

The asteroid 3196 Maklaj, discovered in 1978, was named in his honour.

Maklaj is the basis of the main character in the Esperanto historical novel "Sed Nur Fragmento" by Trevor Steele.

=== Australia ===
The Marine Biological Station in Watson's Bay, built and used by Miklouho-Maclay, was commandeered by the Ministry of Defence in 1899 as a barracks for officers. In the 1980s the Miklouho-Maclay Society unsuccessfully lobbied for the centre to be made into a historical landmark in memory of Miklouho-Maclay's scientific work. Today, although owned by the Sydney Harbour Federation Trust, the building is used as a private residence and is only open to the public on special occasions.

The Miklouho-Maclay Society succeeded in naming a park in his honour in Snails Bay (Birchgrove), not far from a house where he lived in Sydney for a time.

A bust of Miklouho-Maclay was unveiled in front of the Macleay Museum at the University of Sydney to commemorate the 150th anniversary of his birth. The Macleay Miklouho-Maclay Fellowship is available from the University of Sydney each year.

=== Indonesia ===
A monument to Miklouho-Maclay was unveiled in Jakarta, Indonesia, on 3 March 2011.

=== Papua New Guinea ===
The term Maclay Coast has from time to time been used to refer the North-east coast of Papua New Guinea. Miklouho-Maclay began using the term, defining it as extending for 150 miles between Cape Croisilles and Cape King William, and 30–50 miles inland to the mountains of Mana-Boro-Boro (Finisterre Mountains). However, this name is not in use today. The section of the coast from Cape Croisilles to Madang is referred to as part of the North Coast, the bay in which Madang is situated in called Astrolabe Bay, while the coast from Astrolabe Bay to Saidor is the Rai Coast, which in turn gives its name to Rai Coast District, an electorate returning an MP to the National Parliament of Papua New Guinea.

In Madang, Papua New Guinea – not far from where the explorer stayed in the 1870s – a street has been named after him.

In 2000 a monument was erected in New Guinea by Oleg Aliev. In 2013 a monument to celebrate the legacy of Miklouho-Maclay was erected near Bongu village in Madang Province, funded by "Valeria, Irma, and Valentina Sourin, Chief, Sir Peter Barter and volunteers from the Madang Resort and Friends of the Haus Tumbuna".

=== Russia ===
In Russia, there is an Institute of Ethnology and Anthropology and a street in South-West Moscow (where the Peoples' Friendship University of Russia is situated) named in his honour. The district museum in Okulovka, Novgorod Oblast, is named after him.

A Khabarov class river passenger ship was named after him. Based at Khabarovsk, it was used on the Amur River between the 1960s and 1990s.

=== Ukraine ===
The city of Malyn in Zhytomyr Oblast, Ukraine, commemorates the scientist and traveler. The city's recreation park and one of the city's streets are named after Miklouho-Maclay. The Malyn Forestry College in the village of Hamarnya, which is located in the house where Nicholas's brother Mykhailo lived, has a museum whose exhibits tell about the life of the scientist, his family, and the Malyn period of his life. Malyn was visited twice, in 1980 and 1988, by the scientist's grandson Robert Micklouho-Maclay from Australia. In 1986, on the occasion of the 140th anniversary of the scientist's birth, a monument to him was unveiled in Malin.

Since 1946, Lviv has had a Miklouho-Maclay Street. There is also a bust of him in Sevastopol on the Crimean Peninsula.

In 2011, the Ukrainian Geographical Society declared the year of Nickolai Nicklouho-Maclay in Ukraine in connection with the 165th anniversary of his birth.

Monuments
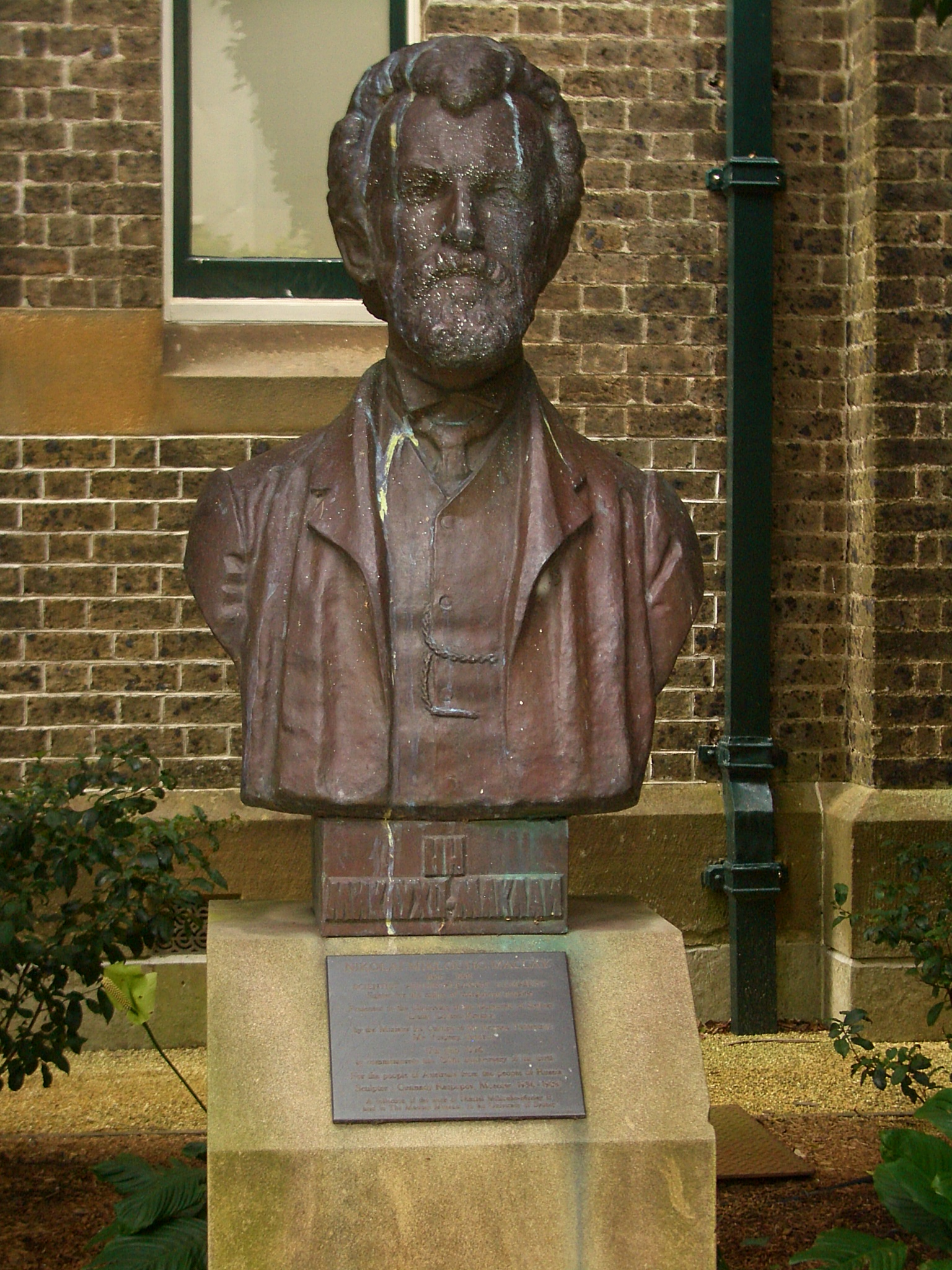
Bust of Miklouho-Maclay, Macleay Museum at University of Sydney

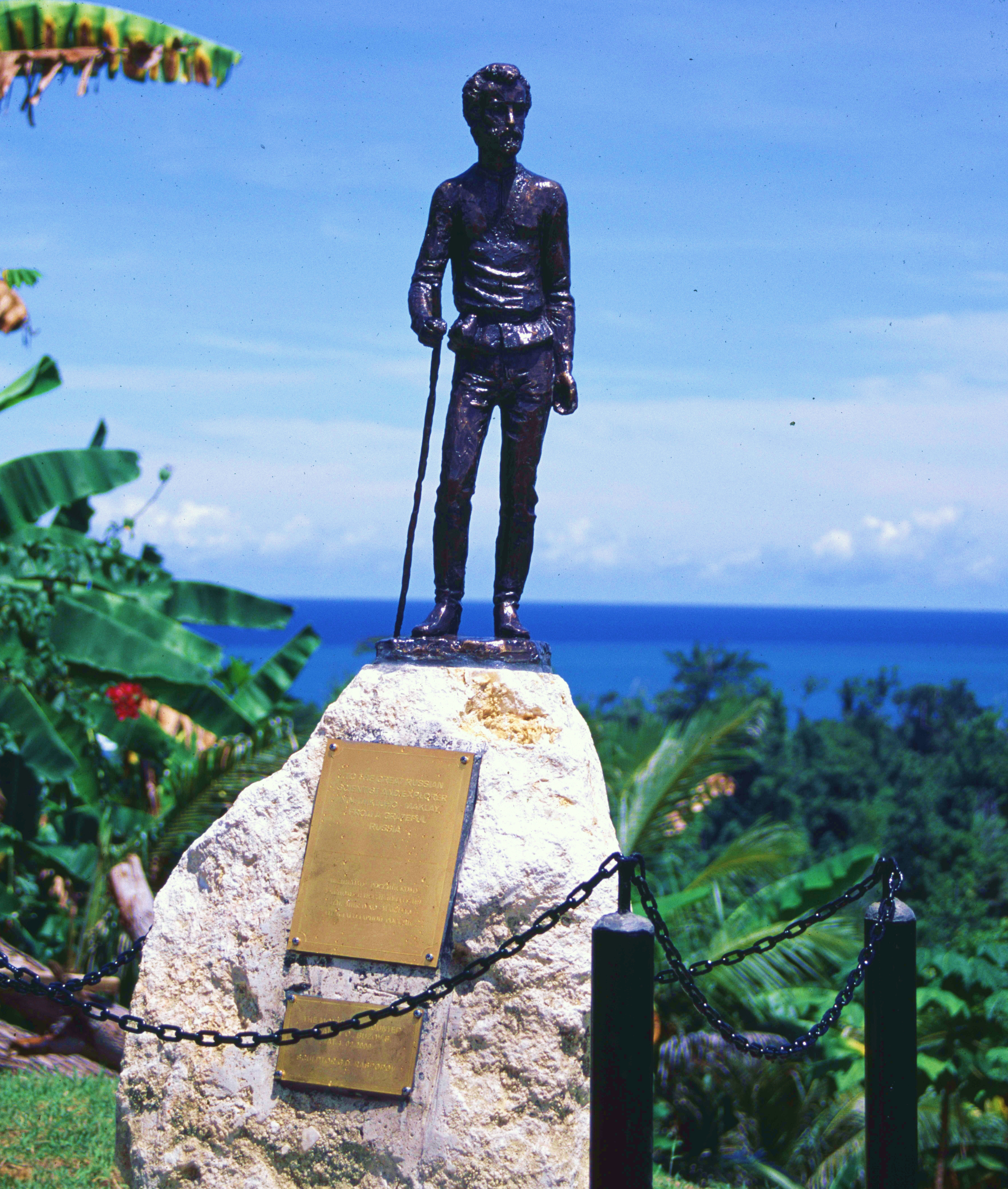
Monument to Miklouho-Maclay in New Guinea

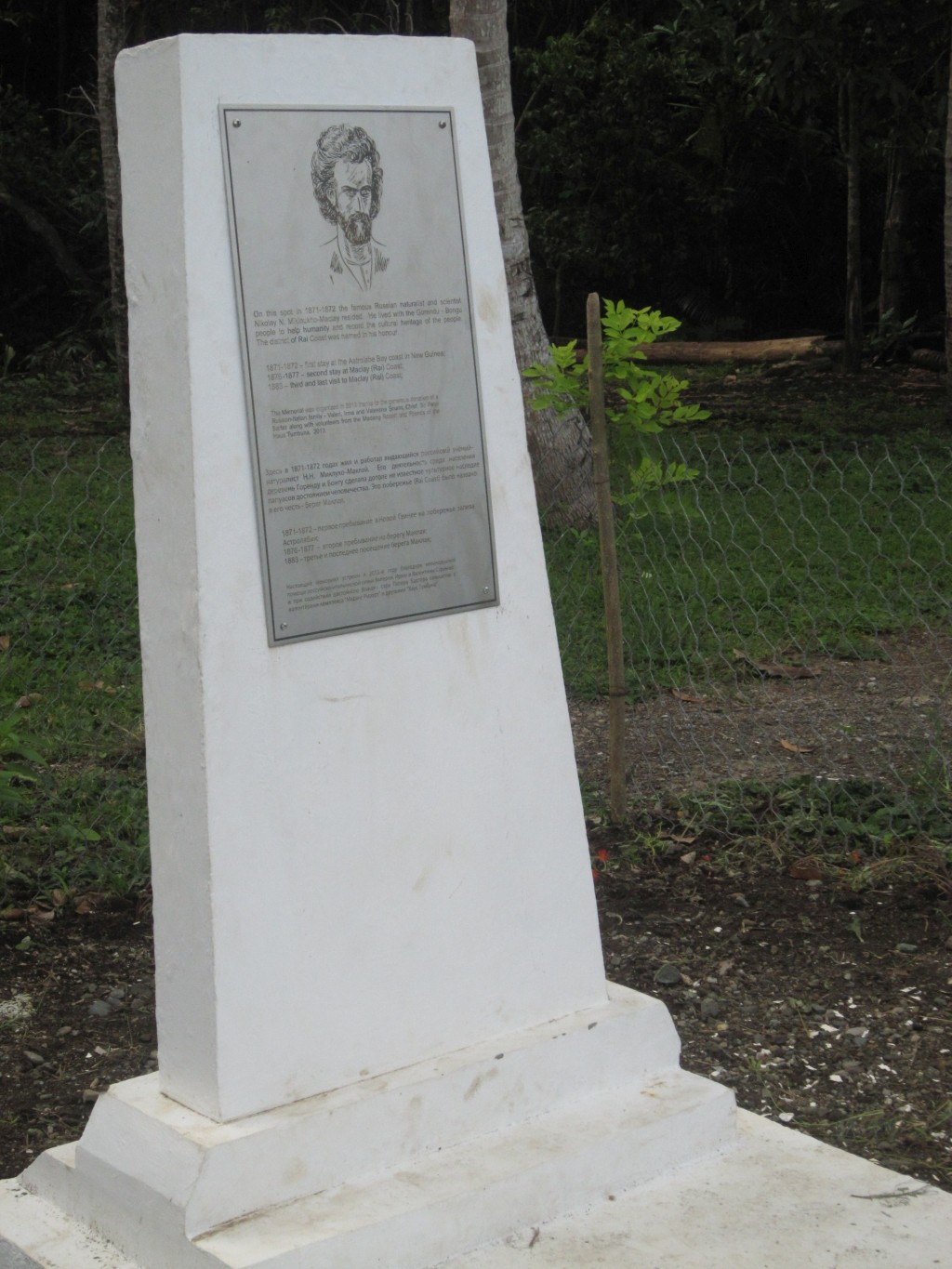
Monument near Bongu Village, Madang Province, New Guinea

== Sources ==
- "Миклуха-Маклай, Николай Николаевич" . Brockhaus and Efron Encyclopedic Dictionary (in Russian). 1906.
- Greenop, F. S. (1944) Who Travels Alone, K.G. Murray Publishing Company, Sydney
- Ogloblin, A. K. (1998) 'Commemorating N. N. Miklukho-Maclay (Recent Russian publications)', in Perspectives on the Bird's Head of Irian Jaya, Indonesia: Proceedings of the Conference, pages.487–502. 1998. ISBN 90-420-0644-7. Partial view on Google Books.
- Torney, Kim (2001). "Miklouho-Maclay, Nikolai". The Oxford Companion to Australian History. Oxford University Press. ISBN 978-0-19-551503-9.
- Tutorsky, A. V., E. V. Govor, and Christopher Ballard. "Miklouho-Maclay’s Legacy in Russian-and English-Language Academic Research, 1992–2017." Archaeology, Ethnology & Anthropology of Eurasia 47.2 (2019): 112–121.
