= Yurulbin Park =

Park in Birchgrove, Sydney, Australia

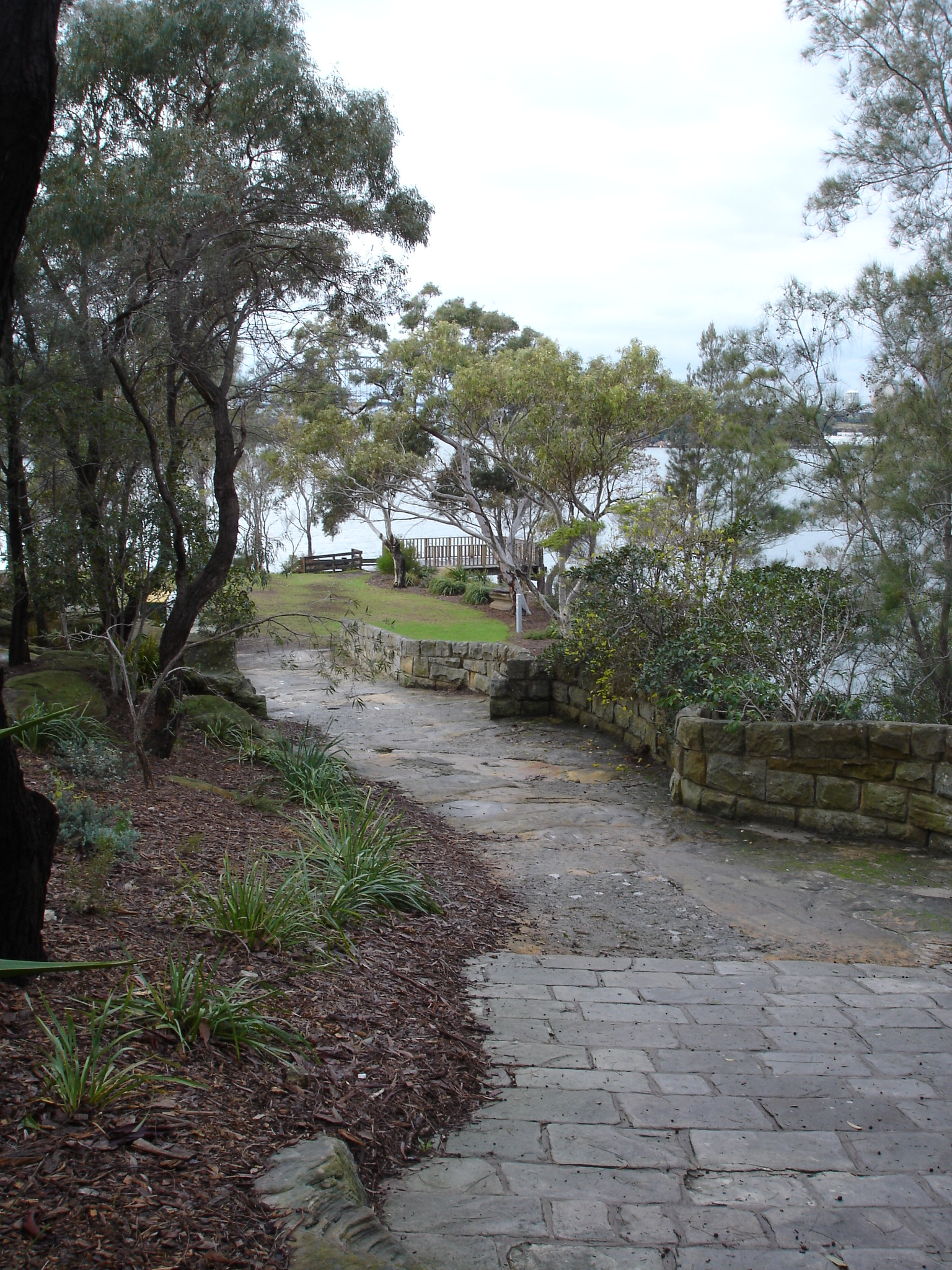
- Yurulbin Park, pictured in 2006
- Interactive map of Yurulbin Park
- Type: Urban park
- Location: Birchgrove, Inner West Council, Sydney, New South Wales, Australia
- Coordinates: 33°50′49″S 151°11′11″E
- Area: 0.61 hectares (1.5 acres)
- Operator: Inner West Council
- Status: Open all year

Yurulbin Park (formerly Long Nose Park) is a 0.61-hectare (1.5-acre) public open space located at the end of Yurulbin Point on the Balmain Peninsula in the suburb of Birchgrove in the Inner West Council local government area in Sydney, New South Wales, Australia.

== Description ==
Yurulbin Point lies north east of Snails Bay and extends approximately 500 metres (1,600 feet) into Port Jackson at the northern end of the Balmain Peninsula. Louisa Road runs the length of the point and has views of Sydney central business district and Sydney Harbour.

At the end of the point lies the Australian Institute of Landscape Architects (AILA) award-winning Yurulbin Park, which was transformed from a derelict industrial site in the early 1970s. The water frontage of the park offers extensive views from Snails Bay, Goat Island, Sydney central business district and the Sydney Harbour Bridge.

The park contains interpretative signs with information about traditional place names of sites in the harbour and the history of the area.

== History ==
Prior to European occupation, the local area was close to the border of the Gadigal and Wanegal clans of the Eora nation and is believed to lie just within Wanegal land. Evidence of etchings and middens on nearby private land show the site was used for fishing and conducting feasts.

Following European settlement in 1792, George Whitfield was granted an area of land on the north eastern end of the Balmain Peninsula and in time it took the descriptive name Long Nose Point. Given its location, it is believed to have been used as a landing point for water craft on the harbour.

The first industrial use of the 0.61-hectare (1.5-acre) site at the end of Long Nose Point was as a galvanised iron works built by a cooper, Alexander Cormack. Further development by the Wallace Powerboat Building Company took place between 1917 and 1920.

In 1923, Morrison & Sinclair Ltd transferred from Johnson's Bay in Balmain to the site and carried out a shipbuilding operation there until the company ceased trading in 1970. The company designed, constructed and repaired Government vessels, Naval, island trading and merchant ships and many Sydney Ferries and yachts. The yacht Morna (later Kurrewa IV), which won line honours seven times from ten starts in the Sydney to Hobart Yacht Race, was built here. Morrison & Sinclair Ltd no longer exists but the records of the company are held by the State Library of New South Wales.

On 17 June 1971, the land was acquired by the State Planning Authority of New South Wales for A$185,000. Landscaping was carried out by Bruce Mackenzie & Associates and the site, then known as Long Nose Park, placed under Leichhardt Council control in 1981. The park won the 1986 AILA Award of Merit.

Both Long Nose Point and the park changed to the traditional name of Yurulbin, Aboriginal for 'Swift Running Water', on 8 July 1994.

== Gallery ==
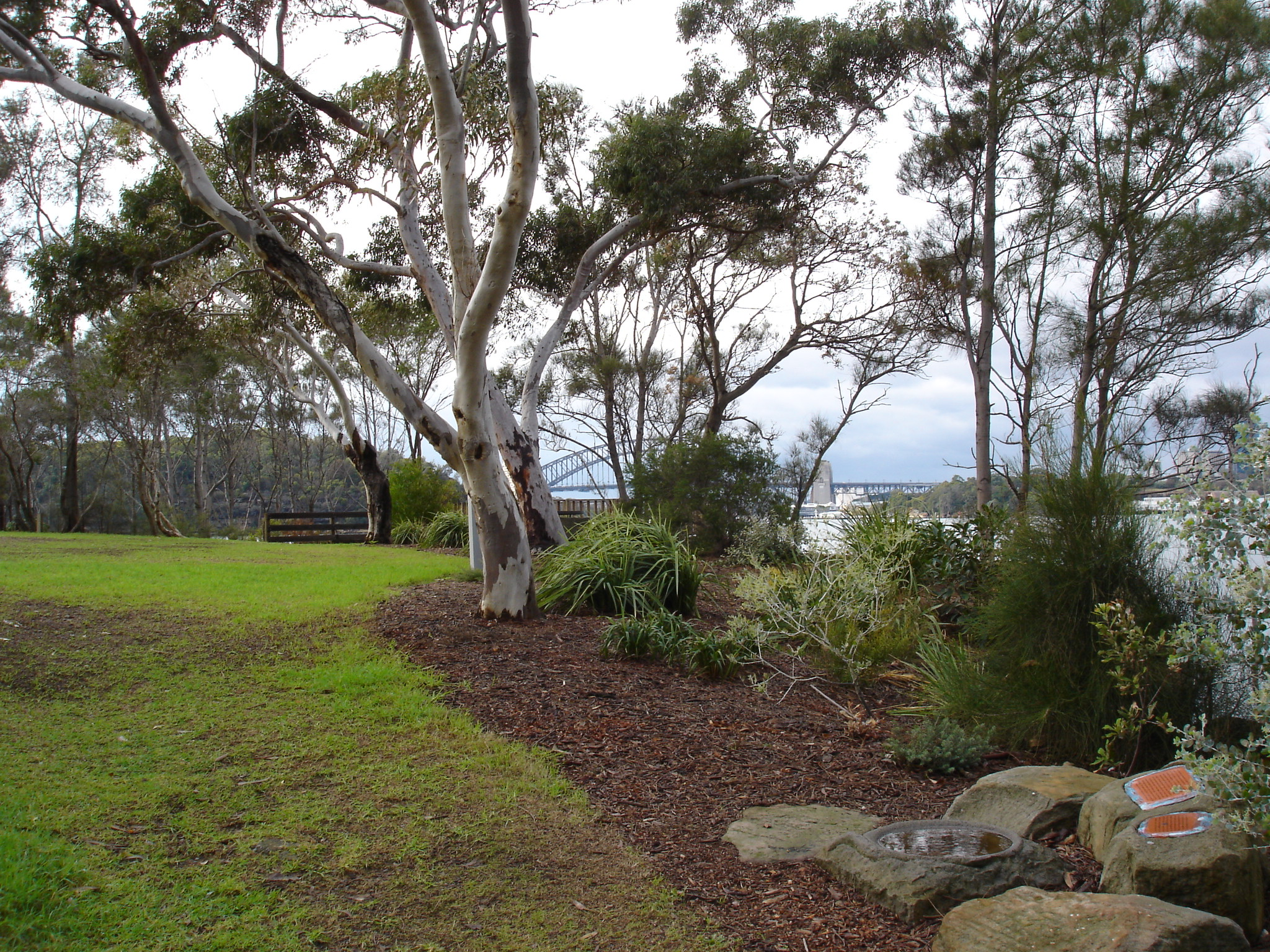
Yurulbin Park with Sydney Harbour Bridge in the background

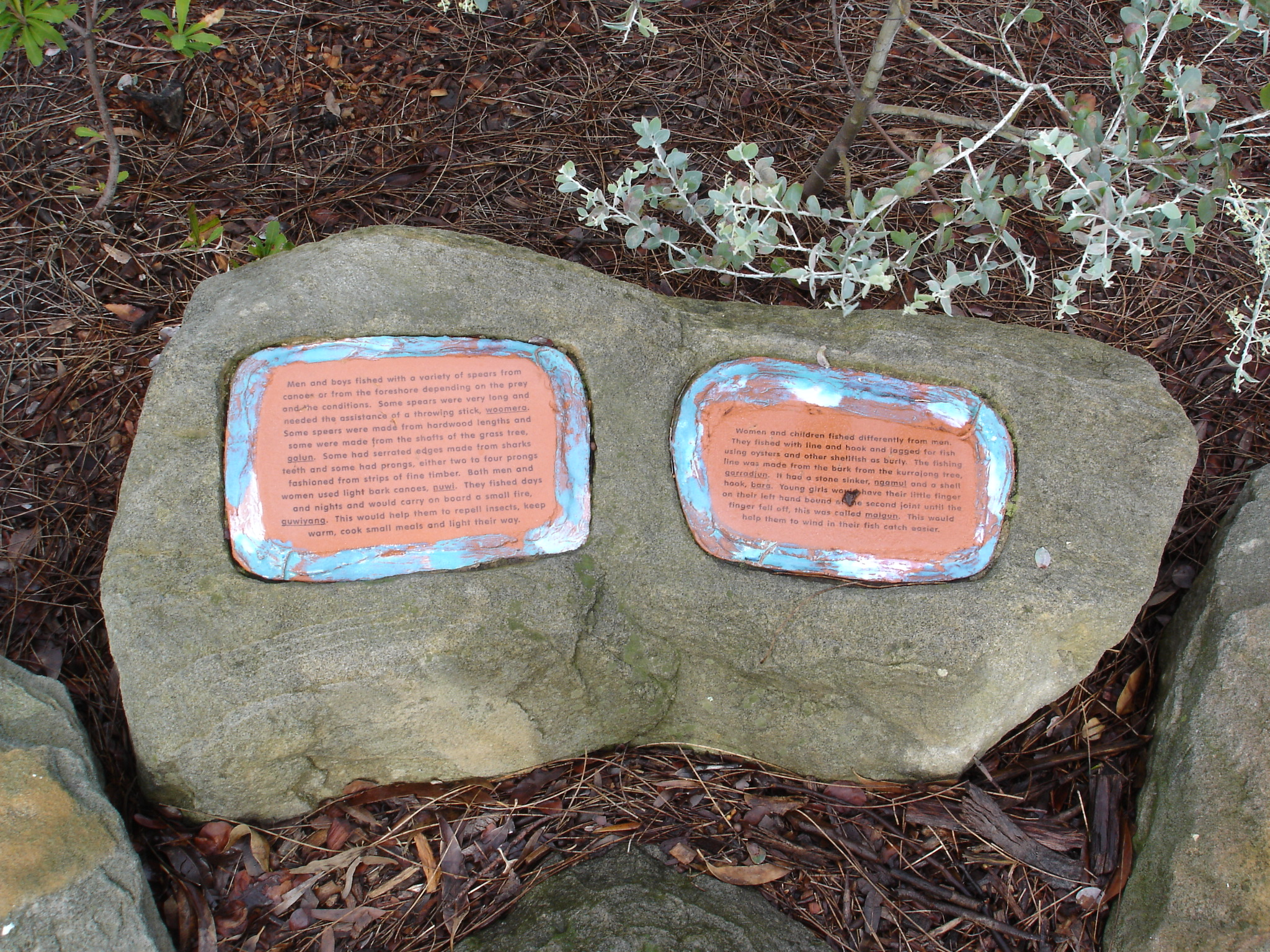
Interpretative sign

== See also ==
- Thomas Sutcliffe Mort
