= Greeno =

Greeno is a surname. Notable people with the surname include:

- Gayle Greeno (born 1949), American writer
- James Greeno (1935–2020), American educational psychologist
- Lola Greeno (born 1946), Australian artist
- Rollie Greeno (1926–2010), American football coach
