= Roland Warpole Loane =

Australian settler

Rowland Walpole Loane
- Born: Bandon, County Cork, Ireland
- Died: 8 October 1844; Hobart, Van Diemen's Land
- Occupations: Merchant, settler
- Spouse: Mary Lee (m. 1828)

Rowland Walpole Loane (died 8 October 1844), a merchant descended from a family of protestant English landlords based in County Cork, was an early settler in New South Wales and Van Diemen's Land. He was more focused on creating personal wealth and the potential for developing an export trade in timber and other colonial products with India and the Isle de France than contributing to colonial society. Loane became well-known within the colony for his questionable actions and unceasing litigation. He appears to have alienated key members of society in the process.

== Early life and career ==
Loane born in Bandon, Cork was descended from a family of English landlords residing in the south of Ireland. His father was a military surgeon and his 7 brothers were either military surgeons, field officers or marines. He claimed he had left the Navy in 1802, but his name has not yet been found in any British naval records. However in 1805 he was the Chief Officer of the Shrewsbury, a country ship from Masulipatam, India which was captured by Cpt Le Meme of La Fortune whilst at anchor in the Bushire roads, in the Persian Gulf. Loane, together with Cpt Youl and Mr John Flower, other English prisoners from the ship Nancy and the Fly, respectively, also captured by La Meme, were released together. They later became the key players in a "hostage" drama involving the Aza Arabs. The sole survivor, Loane published an account in 1805 of those events entitled "Authentic Narrative of the unfortunate escape of Mr. R.W.L. who, with Captain R Youl and Mr John Flower and eleven natives, was captured by the Aza Arabs in the Persian Geulph: also an account of their journey on foot up the Persian coast". (reprinted in 2010 by the British Library).

A year later in 1806 he was the captain of the Olive, which was captured by the French warship the Semillante in the Indian Ocean off Sri Lanka and taken with 6 other English prizes to the Isle de France.

== Life in New South Wales ==
Loane arrived in Hobart Town in 1809 in his own ship, Union, with a cargo of goods valued at £20,000. Accompanying him was the D'Hotman fanily and a number of servants from Isle de France (later Mauritius). After applying to the Lieutenant Governor, David Collins, to be allowed to settle in Hobart Town, he sold the ship and its cargo to begin business as a general merchant. He was an active and successful merchant in Hobart, but drew criticism for letting his cattle damage his neighbours'crops on the assumption that the beasts could not be driven to the pound.

In 1813, Loane commissioned the building of the 133-ton [brig] Campbell Macquarie and moved it to Sydney where he operated as a merchant trader. In Sydney, Loane purchased Birchgrove House and leased land on the Balmain estate.

In 1818, Loane traveled from Sydney to India, and returned to Hobart Town the following year with cargo. During his absence from Hobart Town, the destruction of his account books prevented the collection of large debts owed to him. This experience was perhaps the catalyst leading to his contempt for the colonial government. Before departing for Sydney in 1813, he had bought a fifty-acre (20 ha) farm near Hobart, and leased it back to the original owner. On his return, he found that the tenant leasing his property had died, the land had been fenced for government purposes and the public was using a quarry on his property. He protested to the colonial government, but was never able to recover the documents proving his ownership and, after a prolonged argument with the authorities, he lost his case.

Loane had a 400 acre compensatory land grant at Pittwater and after 1818 purchased several areas in the country, including one at Eastern Marshes in the Oatlands district, and a number of small areas in Hobart, on which he built houses which he often let to government officers.

On another trip to India, Loane returned with a "Woman of Colour", named Madame D'Hotman, whom he had found in extreme poverty in Calcutta. She was said to have been his mistress. Later, in 1820, eager to extricate himself from this woman, he tried to persuade her to return to her husband in Mauritius, and provided her with a credit note worth 1000.00 pounds. Unable to deliver as cash at the time requested, he offered her instead the title to one of his Bathurst St properties. She lived there until her death in August 1831. She claimed however that he had given her his extensive Belle Vue estate. After she died, her daughter claimed the property. Loane fought to regain Belle Vue, all the way to England, but without success.

In 1825, when Loane returned to Sydney, he built a new residence Waterview and acquired land in the town area. He has already encouraged his then invalid brother Major Boyle Loane, retired from the 4th Ceylon Regiment, his wife and 4 children to settle in Hobart Town. They arrived in 1825. In 1827, he returned to Europe and was married in Ireland in 1828 to Mary Lee, daughter of a colonel of the Royal Marines. By 1829, whilst Rowland was overseas, first his sister-in-law (1827) and then his brother died (1829), leaving Rowland Loane and his new wife to become the guardians of his nephew and nieces. In 1830, he sailed from Sydney for Hobart Town with his wife and then made his home on a property at Eastern Marshes, which he named Lee Mount. In 1834, he sold this property after another argument with the colonial government. He briefly returned to England in 1839 to unsuccessfully challenge the colonial government, before returning to Hobart Town in 1841.

He died in Hobart Town on 8 October 1844.

== Litigious attitude ==
Throughout his life, Loane believed that he had been robbed by unscrupulous persons and officials. The records of evidence from various court cases support some of his contentions. To progress in such a community he felt he had to use the same system which attacked him. He proceeded to pursue his grievances though the court systems of New South Wales and England.

According to Lieutenant-Governor William Sorell:

Loane was a person who always asserts that he is ill-used by the world collectively and individually. His hand is against everyone and everyone against him. Not a man in the colony would, I believe, rely upon his word or engagement for the most trifling thing.

In 1834, Loane claimed that Lieutenant-Governor George Arthur had a personal grievance against him and encouraged the pound-keepers and police to take his cattle. His late sister-in-law's family had had close connections with Governor Arthur's family in Plymouth and a significant misunderstanding developed when the Major's family arrived in Hobart Town, (refer Gov Arthur's papers). Rowland, acting like a modern-day "whistle-blower" took his complaints to England and prosecuted in person, displaying rancour, exaggeration and disregard of evidence which did not impress the Colonial Office.

Loane acknowledged his easily-spiked irascibility, which may have led to his reputation as arrogant and solely absorbed with the promotion of his fortune. Loane became well known in the colony for his frequently questioned actions and litigation. He did not participate in any cultural societies that flourished in the community, nor was his name associated with the popular movements of the time, however he was amongst the first investors in the Van Diemen's Land Bank.

== Books ==
- Historical Records of Australia, Series III, vols 2-3
- Correspondence file under Loane (Archives Office of Tasmania)
- Arthur papers (State Library of New South Wales)
