= Frank Sydney Greenop =

Australian journalist (1913–1975)

- Born: 12 March 1913
- Died: 15 June 1975 (aged 62)
- Occupations: journalist, editor, linguist, poet, author
- Writing career
- Pen name: Robert Dudgeon

Frank Sydney Greenop (12 March 1913 – 15 June 1975) was an Australian journalist, editor, linguist, poet and author.

While Greenop was perhaps best known as editor of the then risque magazine, Man, he also had wide-ranging literary tastes and skills. He published historical books, children's books and detective novels (under the pseudonym 'Robert Dudgeon').

== Biography ==
Frank Sydney Greenop was born on 12 March 1913 in Battersea, London. In 1923 at the age of ten his family migrated to Australia. When he was thirteen his father fell ill and Greenop left school. In 1928 he got a job with The Daily Telegraph, as a copy boy.

In 1937 he was picked by Kenneth Murray to be the editor of a new magazine, Man.

He married Margaret on 2 April 1937 and they had four children, one of which died in infancy.

Greenop was an accomplished self-taught linguist and could speak seven languages with some fluency.

He wrote numerous articles and fiction stories for Man, as well as dozens of patriotic and sentimental poems, many of which were collected in a volume of his verses published by K.G. Murray Publishing in 1944.

Greenop was also passionate about history and wrote a number of books on historical subjects, including Coast of Tragedy, a history of shipwrecks off the Australian coast; Who Travels Alone, the story of famous New Guinea explorer Nicholas Miklouho-Maclay and The Life and Achievements of Captain James Cook.

In 1947, while Greenop was 'Editor in Chief' of K.G. Murray's magazine publications, he wrote History of Magazine Publishing in Australia.

During the 1950s he wrote detective novels and stories, including a series of pulp novels for the Cleveland group, using the pseudonym Robert Dudgeon. The protagonist of these stories was the detective Max Strong.

In the 1960s he also published a series of twelve children's books (the Moorooba books), with titles such as Lazy Loper, Koalas Drink Dew, Catapult for Tom, Bunyip with a Swag and Magpie Hero, which were illustrated by Col Cameron.

He died at home on 15 June 1975, aged 62.

== Bibliography ==
- Greenop, Frank Sydney (1944). Coast of Tragedy. Sydney: K.G. Murray Publishing.
- Greenop, Frank Sydney (1944). Verses of Frank S Greenop. Sydney: K.G. Murray Publishing.
- Greenop, Frank Sydney (1944). Who Travels Alone. Sydney: K.G. Murray Publishing.
- Greenop, Frank Sydney (1947). History of Magazine Publishing in Australia. Sydney: K.G. Murray Publishing.
- Greenop, Frank Sydney (1968). Drama of the Past. Sydney: Southern Cross International.
- Greenop, Frank Sydney (1944). Dividends of Deceit A study in the Motives Trends Ambitions of Japan 1942. Unpopular pamphlets; no.6. Sydney: Currawong Publishing Company. Bib ID: 830908 – via Trove.
