= Alice Loane =

British author

- Born: 23 October 1863; Southsea
- Died: 18 January 1922 (aged 58); Clifton
- Occupation: writer
- Writing career
- Genres: nursing and social commentaries

Alice Eliza Loane writing as M. Loane (23 October 1863 – 18 January 1922) was a British author. She is known for being a party to a deception where the joint works of her and her sister were published as the sole work of her sister Martha Loane. In 1910 they fell out and Alice created the only book in her name.

== Life ==
Loane was born in Southsea in 1863. Her elder sister Martha became a nurse and by 1897 their first articles were appearing in the Nursing Notes. Over the next 14 years, more articles appeared in Nursing Notes and then moved on to the Evening News and The Spectator. Using their joint expertise, she wrote nursing textbooks including The District Nurse as Health Missioner. Alice's most valued works were social commentaries which described the poverty at that time. The first of these, The Queen's Poor, was published in 1905.

The sisters were close until 1910 when her sister Martha's conversion to Catholicism caused a break. When Alice died in 1922 it was found that she had written a will to leave her estate to her sister but the will was not signed. Because of the lack of signature her will was not cleared until four years after her sister's death.

Loane died in Clifton in 1922.

== Works ==
These were all published under M.Loane or a similar name but these were attributed to Alice with input from her sister long after they had both died.

- Nursing Notes between 1897 and 1907
- Evening News between 1907 and 1910
- The Spectator between 1910 and 1911
- The District Nurse as Health Missioner
- The Duties of a Superintendent in a Small Home for District Nurses
- The Incidental Opportunities of District Nursing
- Outlines of Routine in District Nursing, 1904
- Simple Sanitation, 1905
- Simple Introductory Lessons in Midwifery, 1906
- The Queen's Poor, 1905
- The Next Street but One, 1907
- From their Point of View, 1908
- Neighbours and Friends, 1909
- An Englishman's Castle, 1910
- The Common Growth, 1911
- Shipmates (1912) the only writing under her own name
