= Rosman Ferries =

Ferry Company

- Founded: 1916
- Founder: Charles Rosman
- Headquarters: Berrys Bay, Sydney, Australia
- Area served: Sydney Harbour
- Services: Ferry operator
- Parent: Noakes Group
- Website: www.rosman.com.au

Rosman Ferries operates ferry services on Sydney Harbour.

== History ==
Rosman Ferries was founded by Charles Rosman in 1916, when he launched a ferry service between Balmain, North Sydney and Garden Island carrying dockyard workers to the Royal Australian Navy base. This service ran until 1981.

Rosman Ferries also provided transportation for workers from Balmain to the Harbour Bridge during its construction in the late 1920s and early 1930s as well as spectator ferries for the Sydney Flying Squadron 18-foot skiff races. The spectator ferries were periodically raided by the Gaming Squad on suspicion of harbouring illegal gambling activities.

In February 1938, the Rosman ferry Rodney capsized and sank with the loss of 19 lives whilst on a charter to farewell the USS Louisville from Sydney Harbour. An inquest found that there had been over 100 passengers on the top deck and Charles Rosman, owner and skipper on the day, was found to be negligent. Rodney was refloated, repaired, renamed, and relaunched as Regalia and she remained running routes on the harbour right into the 1980s.

Following Sydney Ferries Limited withdrawing from the run, in November 1950 Rosman Ferries commenced operating a peak-hour service on the Lane Cove River calling at Hunters Hill, Longueville, Northwood and Greenwich on its way to Circular Quay. It ceased in April 1991 due to declining patronage.

In 1987, Rosman retired and sold the business to Steve and Frank Matthews and Ross and Neva Williams. In 1997, the Matthews' bought out the Williams' shareholding and in 2008 sold the business to Sean Langman's Noakes Group in 2008 who relocated it after 70 years from Mosman Bay to Berrys Bay.

== Fleet ==
=== Current ===
- Royale (1974)
- Regal II (1981)

=== Former ===
- Regalia (1937), rebuilt from Rodney, sank off Taren Point in 2004
- Radar (1947), transferred to Port Huon, Tasmania after restoration by Noakes
