= Fort Macquarie Tram Depot =

Former part of Sydney's tram network

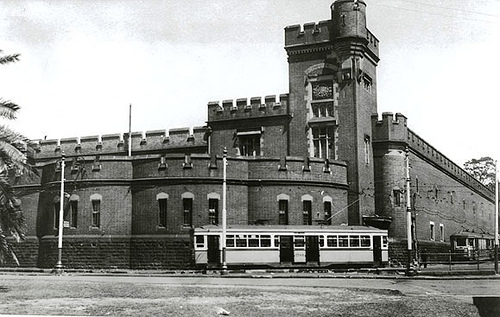
- Interactive map of Fort Macquarie Tram Depot

Location
- Location: Bennelong Point
- Coordinates: 33°51′27″S 151°12′53″E

Characteristics
- Operator: New South Wales Tramways

History
- Opened: 10 August 1902
- Closed: 22 October 1955

Fort Macquarie Tram Depot was part of the Sydney tram network. It opened in 1902 on the site of the old Fort Macquarie and was demolished in 1958 to make way for the construction of the Sydney Opera House.

== History ==
Fort Macquarie Tram Depot was built on Bennelong Point in Sydney opening on 10 August 1902, on the site of the old Fort Macquarie. The depot was constructed in the design of a fortress with castellated ramparts in homage to the previous building. The depot closed on 22 October 1955 before being demolished in 1958 to make way for the construction of the Sydney Opera House.

With the closing of Fort Macquarie depot, most of the services were transferred to Dowling Street depot.

== Design ==
- 12 tracks
- Battlement style front parapet
- Brick pediments, vents within false windows
- Roof orientation to south

== Operations ==
The depot consisted of a 12 road shed, with loop line laid around the outside. The loop and sidings on the western side of the depot were an important lay-over point for trams serving many lines. This took pressure away from Circular Quay during busy periods. Entry to the depot and loop line was controlled from a signal box located adjacent to the tracks. Nothing remains of the depot; the buildings were totally razed to make way for the Opera House.

Services from Fort Macquarie (some of these services also commenced at Circular Quay and Millers Point) were:

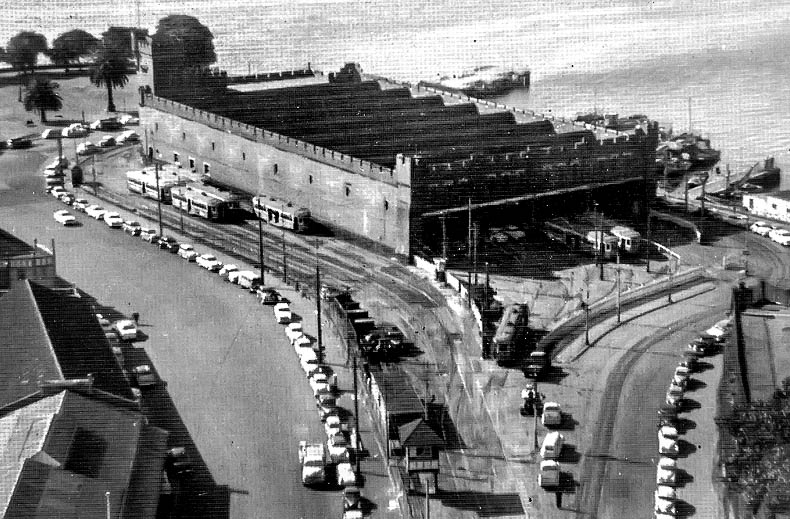

- Fort Macquarie to Rozelle, Drummoyne, Gladesville and Ryde
- Fort Macquarie to Forest Lodge, Balmain and Birchgrove
- Fort Macquarie to Haberfield, Five Dock and Abbotsford
- Fort Macquarie to Leichhardt
- Fort Macquarie to Glebe Point
- Fort Macquarie to Kensington
- Fort Macquarie to Rosebery
- Circular Quay to Railway Colonnade

Dimensions:

- Width: 131 ft
- Length of car shed: 250 ft
- Length of building from end to end: 307 ft
- Height from ground level 36 ft
- Height from pit level: 41 ft
- Height of turret: 80 ft
