= Fort Macquarie =

Battlement fort in Sydney, Australia

- Bennelong Point, Sydney
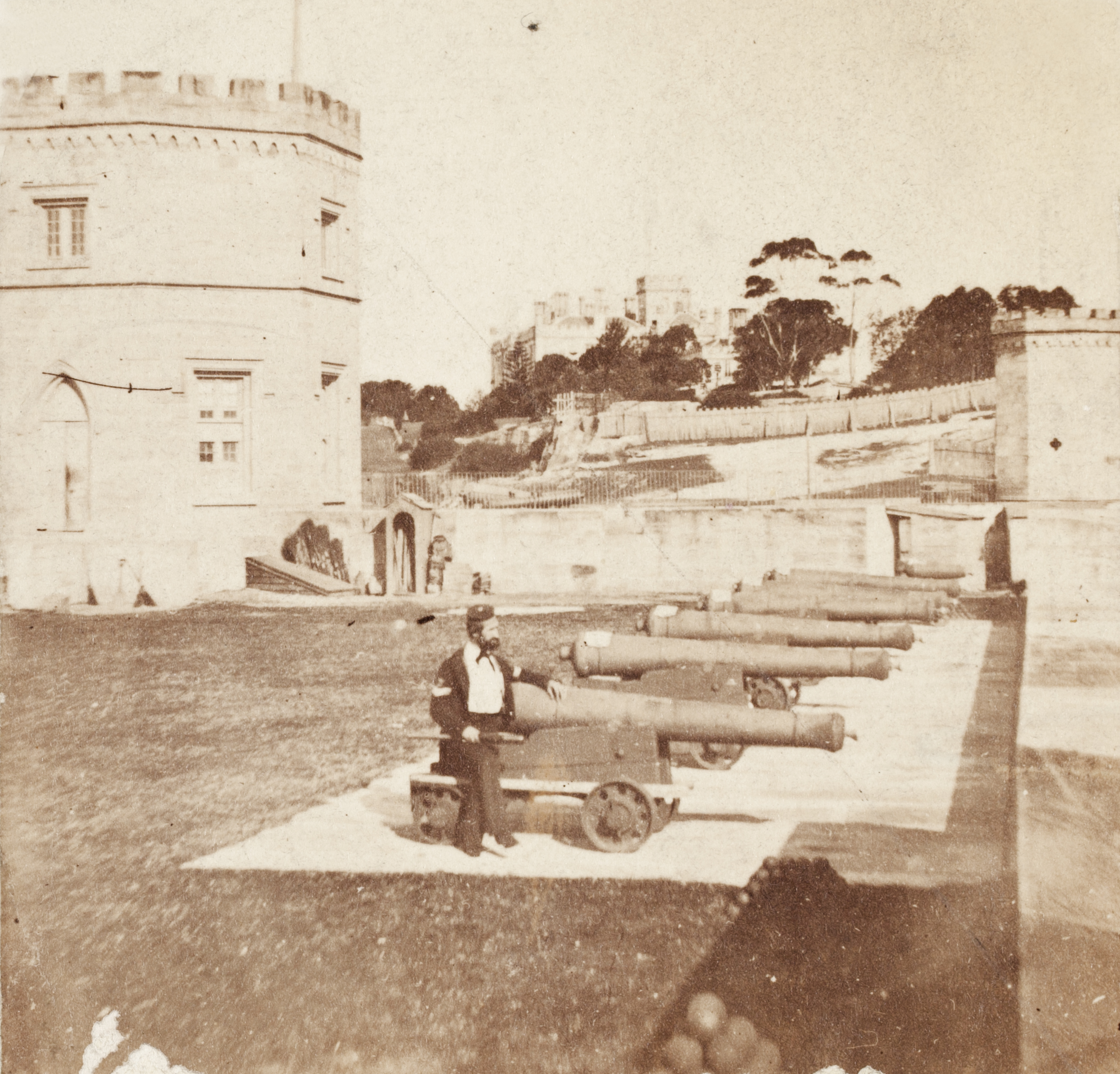
- Fort Macquarie, 1858-1859, William Hetzer.

Site information
- Type: Fort
- Condition: Demolished in 1901

Location
- Location of the former fort in Greater Sydney
- Location within inner Sydney
- Coordinates: 33°51′25″S 151°12′55″E

Site history
- Built: 1817

Fort Macquarie was a square castellated battlement fort built in 1798 at Bennelong Point, Sydney, New South Wales, Australia, on the site where the Sydney Opera House now stands. It was demolished in 1901 to make way for the Fort Macquarie Tram Depot.

== History ==
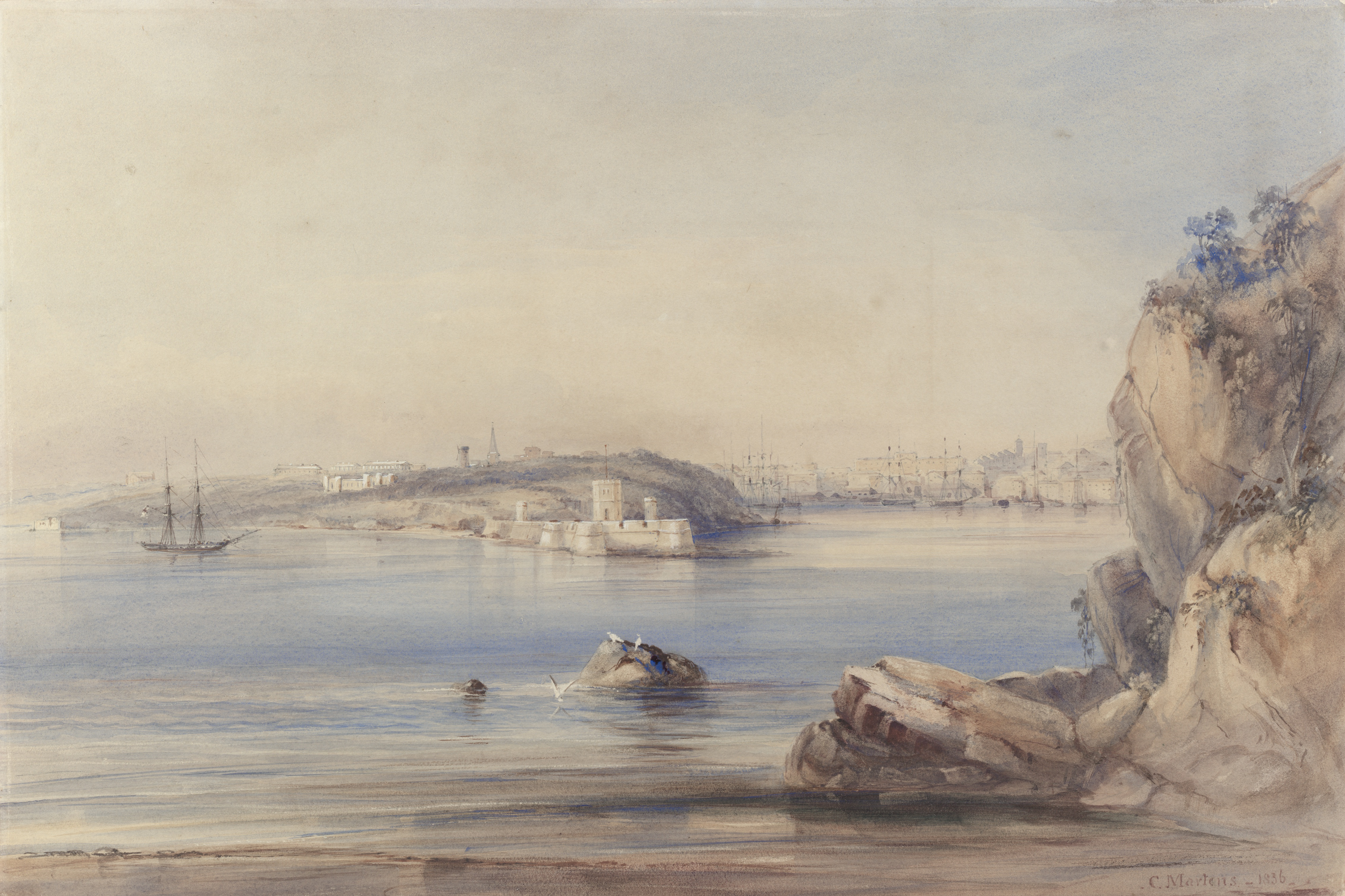
Fort Macquarie and Sydney Cove, 1836

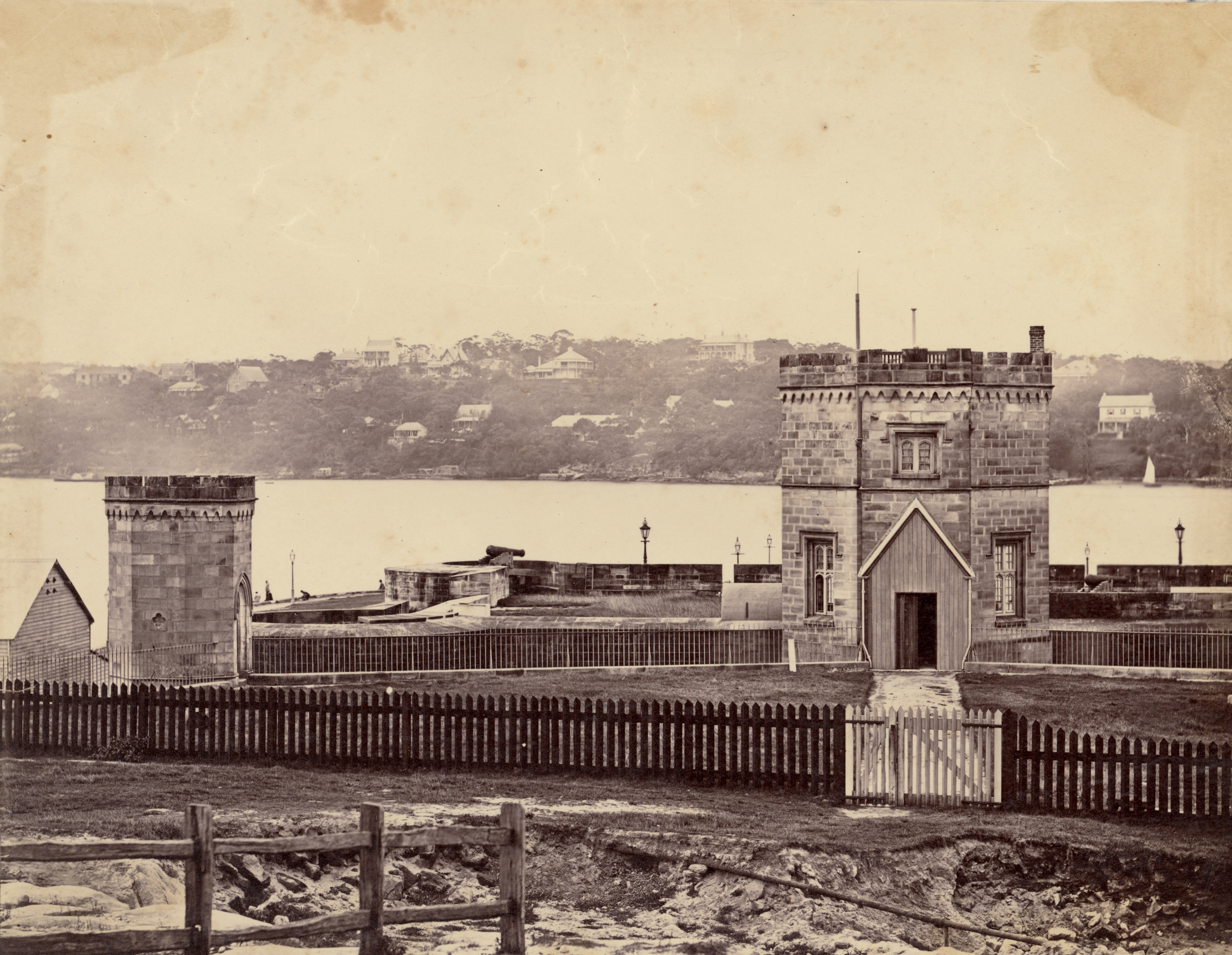
Fort Macquarie, Sydney, ca. 1885, (attrib.) Joseph Bischoff

The original name of Bennelong Point, the finger of land on which Fort Macquarie was built, was Inbughalee (also recorded as Djubuguli). The European name for the point was named after Bennelong who lived at this site, alongside Barangaroo, in a small brick house that was gifted to them by Governor Arthur Phillip. Other houses were built for Aboriginal people there and were used by various people.

The first attempt at naval fortifications were erected here in July 1788, when Lieutenant William Dawes was directed by Phillip to build a small redoubt. When finished in November 1788 it held two brass six-pounder guns. This early fort was demolished in 1791 and the guns and flagstaff moved to the west side of the cove. The earthworks were then used for the Governor's garden and later the largest building in Sydney, a 24 by 7.5 metres (79 ft × 25 ft) storeroom, was erected there.

In 1798 a half-moon battery was built on the extreme end of the point which purportedly used guns from the armed tender Supply. It was described by a Mr Pern in 1802,

the goal battery on the northern point of Sydney Cove is built on a rock of difficult access, carrying six pieces of cannon protected by a trench of turf, crosses the fire by another battery.

Lieutenant William Kent and his crew were assigned to man the primitive defences.

In 1817, Governor Lachlan Macquarie ordered that a new fortification be built on the site at Bennelong Point under the direction of then Colonial Architect Francis Greenway, which was completed in February 1821.

In 1901, the New South Wales Minister of Works decided to demolish Fort Macquarie. A naval drill shed on the site was also pulled down and both buildings were replaced with the Fort Macquarie Tram Depot, whose crenulated walls imitated the original towers and walls of the fort.

== Design ==
Designed by Francis Greenway the foundation stone of Fort Macquarie was laid by Governor Lachlan Macquarie on 17 December 1817. The stone used was from the nearby Governor's Domain quarry and convicts worked on it for around two years before it was complete. Its square design meant three of its faces were open to the sea to ensure a clear line of fire for its cannons.

At the centre stood a two-storey tower, 27.4 metres in circumference which housed a guardroom and storehouse. The walls at the top were around one and a half metres thick. A powder magazine capable of storing 350 barrels of gunpowder was constructed underneath and the tower could provide accommodation for a small military detachment of 1 officer and 18 men, with stores for the battery. The battery consisted of fifteen pieces of ordnance: ten 24-pounders and five 6-pounders. In the early years the fort was separated from the main spit of land by a narrow passage of salt water crossed by a drawbridge, this was later filled up to make a roadway.

== Cannon disposal ==
Two 42 pdr ML cannon from Fort Macquarie were removed from the fort and transported to Newcastle in 1903 to form a memorial in Gregson Park, Hamilton. In 2006 they underwent a refurbishment and have been replaced back into Gregson Park. Another cannon now sits in Hyde Park.
