= USS Louisville (CA-28) =

Northampton-class heavy cruiser

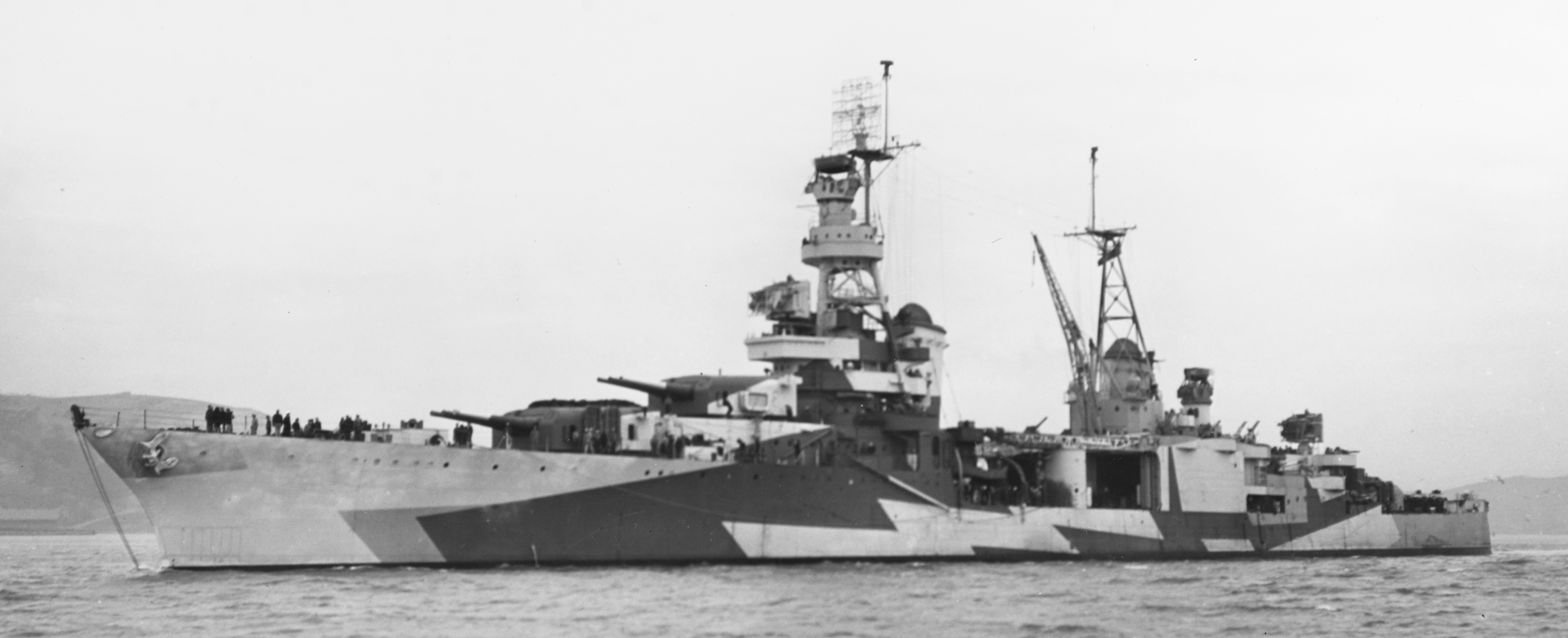
- USS Louisville (CA-28), off Mare Island Navy Yard, Vallejo, California, 17 December 1943. Camouflage is Measure 32, pattern 6d.

History

United States
- Name: Louisville
- Namesake: City of Louisville, Kentucky
- Ordered: 18 December 1924
- Awarded: 19 April 1927; 13 June 1927 (supplementary contract)
- Builder: Puget Sound Naval Yard, Bremerton, Washington
- Laid down: 4 July 1928
- Launched: 1 September 1930
- Commissioned: 15 January 1931
- Decommissioned: 17 June 1946
- Reclassified: CA-28, 1 July 1931
- Stricken: 1 March 1959
- Identification: Hull symbol: CL-28; Hull symbol: CA-28; Code letters: NIFT
- Nickname(s): "Lady Lou"
- Honors and awards: 13 × battle stars
- Fate: Sold for scrap, 14 September 1959

General characteristics (as built)
- Class & type: Northampton-class cruiser
- Displacement: 9,050 long tons (9,200 t) (standard)
- Length: 600 ft 3 in (182.96 m) (oa)
- Beam: 66 ft 1 in (20.14 m)
- Draft: 23 ft (7.0 m) (deep load)
- Installed power: 8 × White-Forster boilers; 107,000 shp (80,000 kW)
- Propulsion: 4 × screws, 4 × steam turbines
- Speed: 32.7 knots (60.6 km/h; 37.6 mph)
- Range: 10,000 nmi (19,000 km; 12,000 mi) at 15 knots (28 km/h; 17 mph)
- Complement: 90 officers 601 enlisted; 1,100 officers and men
- Armament: 3 × triple 8 in (203 mm)/55 guns; 4 × 5 in (127 mm)/25 DP guns; 2 × triple 21 in (533 mm) torpedo tubes
- Armor: Belt: 3–3 3/4 in (76–95 mm); Deck: 1–2 in (25–51 mm); Barbettes: 1 1/2 in (38 mm); Turrets: 3/4–2 1/2 in (19–64 mm); Conning Tower: 1 1/4 in (32 mm)
- Aircraft carried: 4 × floatplanes
- Aviation facilities: 2 × Amidship catapults and hangar

General characteristics (1945)
- Armament: 3 × triple 8 in (203 mm)/55 guns; 8 × single 5 in (127 mm)/25 DP guns; 5 × quad, 4 × twin 40 mm (1.6 in) Bofors guns; 27 × twin 20 mm (0.8 in) Oerlikon guns
- Aircraft carried: 2 × Curtiss SC Seahawk floatplanes
- Aviation facilities: 1 × catapult and hangar

USS Louisville (CL/CA-28), a Northampton-class cruiser, was the third ship of the United States Navy to be named for the city of Louisville, Kentucky. She was active throughout the Pacific War. USS Louisville was the first large warship to be built in a drydock.

Louisville was launched on 1 September 1930 at the Puget Sound Navy Yard, Bremerton, Washington, sponsored by Miss Jane Brown Kennedy, and commissioned on 15 January 1931. Louisville since commissioning day carried, on the prominent bulkhead, a shoe of the great stallion, Man o' War, as a talisman against evil.

She was originally classified as a light cruiser, CL-28, because of her thin armor. Effective 1 July 1931, Louisville was redesignated a heavy cruiser, CA-28, because of her 8-inch guns in accordance with the provisions of the London Naval Treaty of 1930.

== Service history ==
=== Interwar period ===
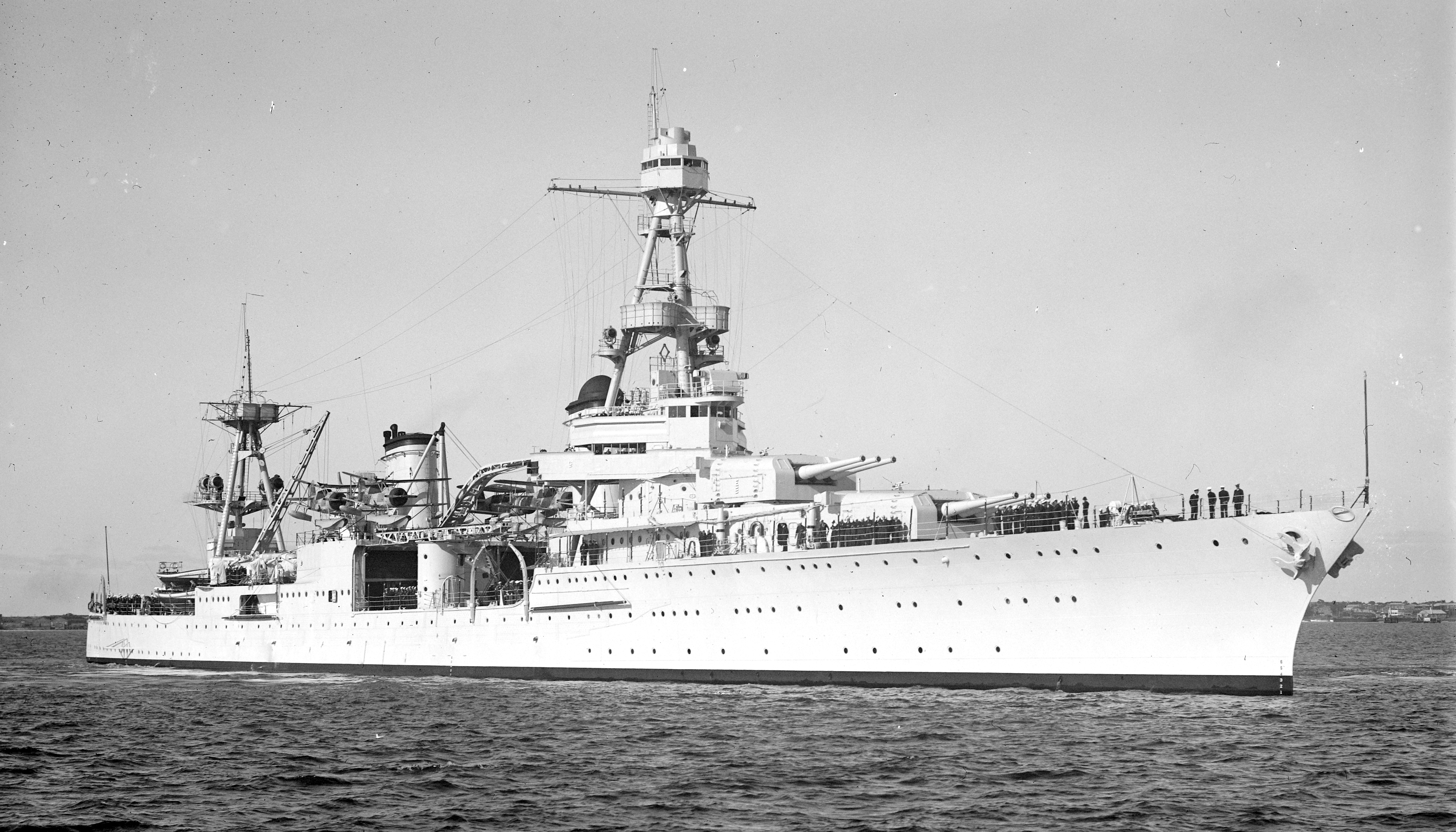
USS Louisville in 1938

Louisville's shakedown cruise, running through the summer, fall, and winter of 1931, took her from Bremerton to New York City via the Panama Canal. Returning from New York, she participated in the 1932 fleet problems before commencing gunnery exercises in the San Pedro-San Diego area. During the winter of 1933, she steamed for Hawaii, returning after exercises to San Pedro where she became a schoolship for anti-aircraft (AA) training. In April 1934, the cruiser steamed out of San Diego to begin a nine-month voyage "showing the flag" at various ports in Central America, the Caribbean Sea, and along the gulf and east coasts. Arriving back in California in late fall, Louisville participated in gunnery and tactical exercises until the spring of 1935, when she departed for Dutch Harbor, Alaska, and, thence, to Pearl Harbor to take part in fleet problems.

For the next two years, she operated off the West Coast, participating in the 1936 and 1937 fleet problems, making good will calls at Latin American ports and undergoing local training operations. On 16 July 1937 at about 1200 hours, she collided with the American halibut-fishing boat Alten in the harbor at Ketchikan, Territory of Alaska; she and a United States Coast Guard Cutter, USCGC Cyane, assisted Alten's crew of 11 and there was no loss of life, although Alten was badly damaged.

In January 1938, Louisville began a long Pacific cruise which took her to Hawaii, Samoa, Australia, and Tahiti before returning to Pearl Harbor for fleet problems. While in Sydney, Australia, the crew of the Louisville rescued a number of passengers from a sightseeing ferryboat which had capsized and sank when most of the passengers crowded on the open top deck ran to the rail to wave the cruiser off. Nineteen of the ferry's passengers died.

The winter of 1939 found Louisville participating in fleet exercises in the Caribbean. She operated in these waters until May, when she returned to the west coast. After fleet problems off Hawaii that autumn, Louisville departed Long Beach, California, for an extended cruise through the Panama Canal to eastern South America. At Bahia, Brazil, she received orders to proceed to Simonstown, South Africa.

As a neutral ship, Louisville traveled the U-boat-infested waters with her American flag spotlighted. At Simonstown, she received $148 million in British gold for deposit in the United States. She then sailed for New York City, delivered her precious cargo and returned to the Pacific.

=== World War II ===
On 7 December 1941, Louisville, escorting A. T. Scott and President Coolidge, was en route from Tarakan, East Borneo, to Pearl Harbor. She continued on to Hawaii, stopped briefly to survey the damage and proceeded on to California. There she joined Task Force 17 (TF 17) and steamed from San Diego on 6 January 1942, for Samoa, landing troops there on 22 January. Her first offensive operation of the war came on her return trip when she took part in carrier plane raids on 1–2 February on the Gilbert and Marshall Islands. During this action, one of her scout planes went missing and the pilot and aircrewman were lost.

After a short stay at Pearl Harbor, Louisville commenced patrolling the Ellice Islands area to help protect American bases in that vicinity. Early in March she joined TF 119, a carrier force, and began operations to stem the Japanese advance down the Bismarck Archipelago and the Solomons. This force steamed in the Salamaua-Lae-Rabaul sector for a number of days, making airstrikes on numerous objectives.

Following this operation, Louisville returned to Pearl Harbor, proceeding from there to Mare Island Navy Yard, San Francisco, where her anti-aircraft armament was increased with additional 1.1 in and 20 mm cannon fitted. On 31 May, she steamed for the Aleutians to join TF 8 to counter the enemy forces expected to be in the area. Fortunately for Louisville, the Japanese carrier force did not locate her and the other cruisers during the attacks on Dutch Harbor, which coincided with the Battle of Midway. Her duties, during this period of Japan's strongest efforts to establish the northern end of her "ribbon defense" in the western Aleutians, were primarily those of convoy escort, but included shore bombardment of Kiska Island.

On 11 November, the cruiser departed San Francisco for Pearl Harbor, continuing, after a few days on to the South Pacific, escorting several troop transports as far as New Caledonia. She then proceeded north to Espiritu Santo to Join TF 67, which was then battling Japanese forces in the Solomons. On 29 January 1943, Louisville participated In the Battle off Rennell Island, the last of the seven naval battles for Guadalcanal, after which she operated east of the island until it was entirely secured.

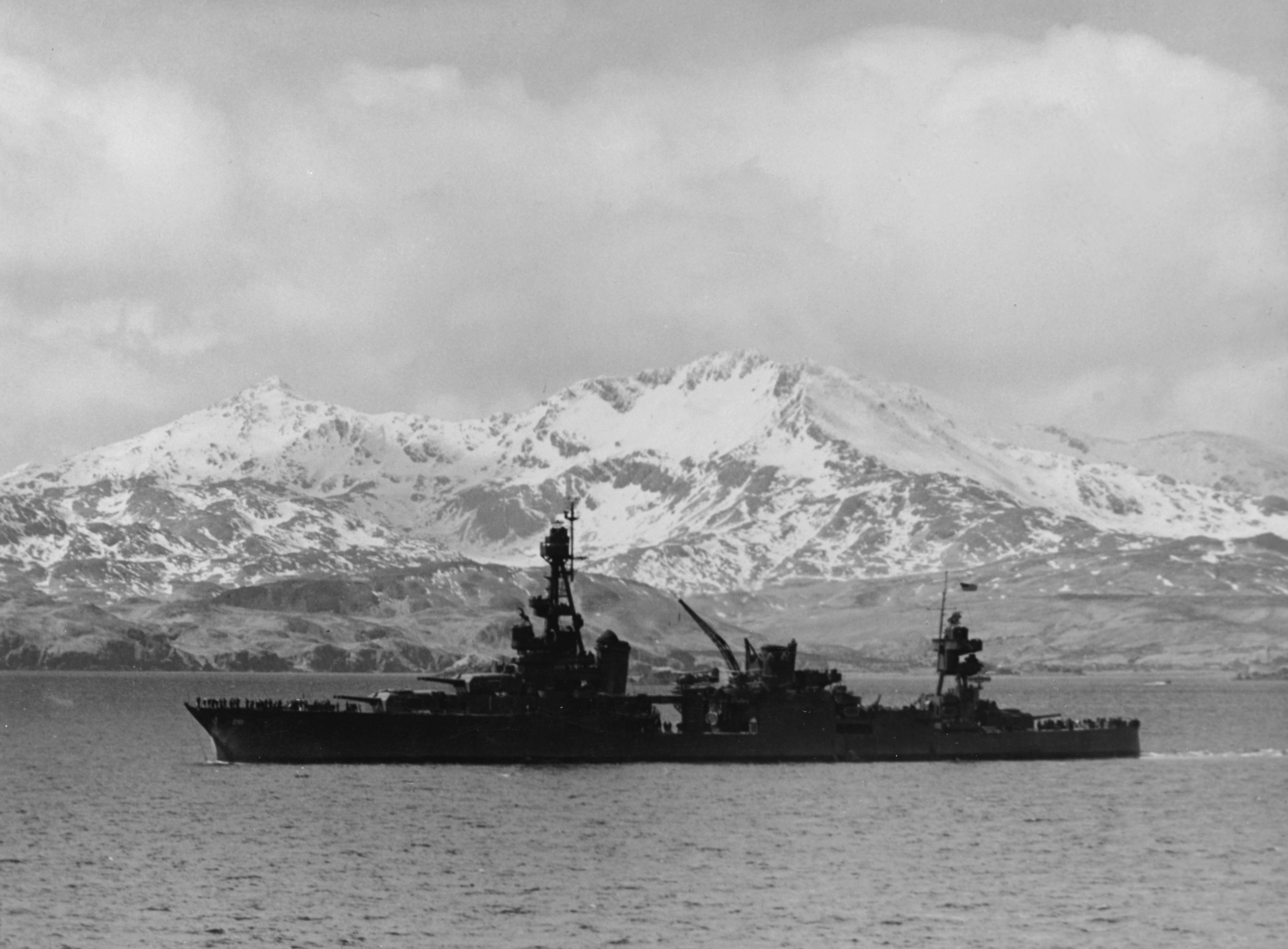
USS Louisville at Aleutian Islands

In April, Louisville steamed, via Pearl Harbor, to the Aleutians. There, as a unit of TF 16, the cruiser covered the assault and occupation of Attu (11–30 May) and participated In the pre-invasion bombardment of Kiska in July.

After the latter was evacuated by the Japanese, she conducted escort of convoy operations in the northern Pacific. In August 1943 she proceeded to the Mare Island Navy Yard for an overhaul to her machinery and alterations. Louisville was in overhaul at Mare Island from 8 October until 24 December 1943. Like her sister ships her forward mast was cut down and her aft mainmast was removed to be replaced with a lighter tripod just aft of the second funnel. Louisville had the camouflage measure 32-6D paint scheme added and two new mark 34 main battery directors installed. The 1.1 in AA cannon mounts were removed and replaced with several quad 40 mm Bofors mounts along with numerous 20 mm cannon. Improved radars and flagship spaces were also added. Following this work in January 1944, Louisville returned to the southern Pacific as the flagship of Rear Admiral J. B. Oldendorf, who was to command the naval gunfire support groups through the amphibious operations ahead. In the Marshalls at the end of the month, she bombarded Wotje Atoll, west of Kwajalein, on 29 January. Then the cruiser turned her guns on the airfield and troop concentrations on Roi and Namur on the southern tip of the atoll, contributing to the conquest of those islands by 3 February. During this campaign, while waiting bombardment further targets an 8-inch 55 caliber shell fired from USS Indianapolis ricocheted off the island to explode a near miss alongside Louisville starboard side causing heavy pieces of shrapnel which damaged the chiefs quarters, pierced the bulkhead, and turret No. 3 – 8-inch gun had shrapnel damage on the tips of the barrels- no injuries. Two weeks later, Louisville led the gunfire support group into action at Eniwetok.

After Eniwetok, Louisville joined TF 58, and with the fast aircraft carriers struck Japanese installations in the Palaus, in March, and bombarded Truk and Sawatan in April. June brought preparations for the invasion of the greater Marianas, and again Louisville was the leading unit in shore bombardment operations; beginning with Saipan, where she fired continuously for the first 11 days of that engagement, through the shelling of Tinian, and ending with the assault on Guam.

Louisville became the first large US ship to enter Philippine waters since 12 December 1941. On 21 October 1944, while Louisville was bombarding Leyte she was hit by the kamikaze plane shrapnel killing one crewmember. On 25 October 1944, she was in the Battle of Leyte Gulf, participating in the last engagement of a battleline as the Japanese southern force attempted to force its way into Leyte Gulf through Surigao Strait. Admiral Oldendorf deployed the American battleline across the strait and PT boats and destroyers on either side of the narrow body of water, defeating the Japanese ships as they passed through the strait.

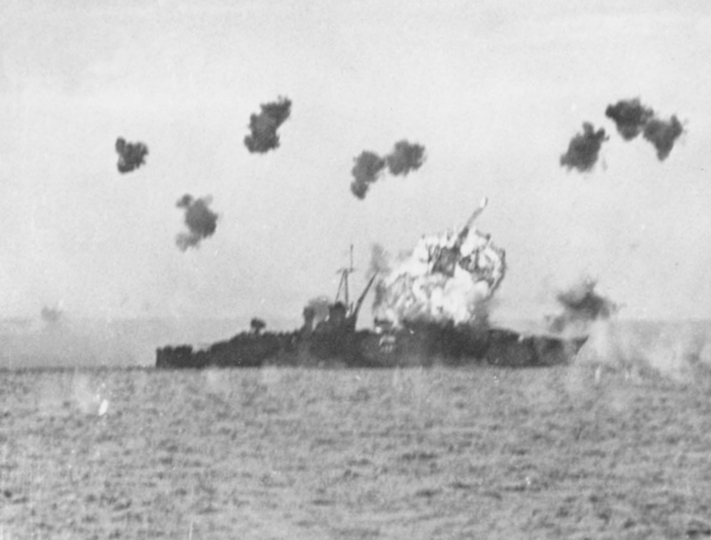
USS Louisville hit by a kamikaze (Mitsubishi Ki-51) in Lingayen Gulf, 6 January 1945

Following Leyte operations, Louisville rejoined the fast carriers now designated TF 38, and participated in pre-invasion strikes against the enemy on Luzon. By the new year, 1945, Louisville was headed towards Lingayen Gulf. While en route on 5–6 January, two kamikazes headed for and scored on her. The first kamikaze on 5 January 1945 hit the No. 2 main battery 8-inch 55 caliber gun knocking it completely out of commission killing one man with 17 injured/burned including Captain Rex LeGrande Hicks. The second kamikaze on 6 January 1945 hit the starboard side signal bridge. Rear Admiral Theodore E. Chandler, commander of Cruiser Division 4 (CruDiv 4) was fatally injured helping the sailors man handle the fire hoses to put out the massive flames during the latter attack, and died of his wounds the following day. Commander (later Rear Admiral) William P. McCarty took control of Louisville and managed recovery efforts in fighting fires and restoration of equipment, for which he was awarded the Silver Star. 42 crewmen were also killed and 125 or more men were wounded. Bridge knocked out of commission at the time forced switch of control to battery no. 2 by second smoke stack. Despite extensive damage, the cruiser shelled the beaches and shot down several enemy planes before withdrawing on 9 January 1945 and proceeding to Mare Island Navy Yard for repairs.

Her repairs completed on 10 April 1945, Louisville delivered Admiral Halsey's 50 officers and 100 staff to the battleship Missouri at Guam and Louisville returned to the Pacific to join TF 54 in providing gunfire support for ground forces on Okinawa. On 5 June 1945, she was again hit by a kamikaze (initially identified as a friendly plane). Four twin 20 AA cannon opened up to set the kamikaze ablaze prior to hitting Louisville which killed eight sailors on a quad 40 mm AA gun mount, injured 45 sailors, bent the number 1 smoke stack and cut Louisville's seaplane off and left only the pontoon on the catapult. Louisville was back on the gun line by 9 June, to remain on station until ordered back to Pearl Harbor for repairs on 15 June.

== Post-war ==
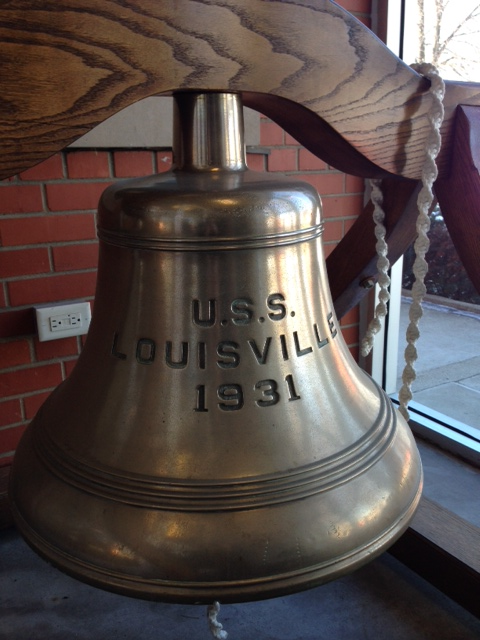
Louisville's ship's bell

With the end of the war on 14 August, Louisville was again seaworthy and hurriedly prepared for postwar duties. On 16 August, she sailed for Guam to Darien, Manchuria, with Rear Admiral T. G. W. Settle on board. From Darien, where the evacuation of Allied prisoners of war was supervised, she steamed to Qingdao, where Japanese vessels in that area were surrendered by Vice Admiral Kaneko. Louisville then escorted the surrendered vessels to Jinsen, Korea, after which she returned to China for further postwar duties at Yantai. In mid-October, she joined the Yellow Sea force for abbreviated service before proceeding, via San Pedro, to Philadelphia, where she decommissioned on 17 June 1946 and entered the Atlantic Reserve Fleet. Remaining with that fleet for the next 13 years, Louisville was struck from the Naval Vessel Register on 1 March 1959, and sold on 14 September to the Marlene Blouse Corporation of New York.

Louisville's ship's bell is on display at the Navy Operational Support Center in Louisville, Kentucky. One of her main battery 8-inch 55 caliber gun turrets (Turret No. 2) damaged in a kamikaze attack on 5 January 1945, was removed and replaced. The turret was repaired, but with the end of the war it was no longer needed. After sitting for over a decade, it was taken to the Nevada Test Site and converted into a rotating radiation detector, to collect data on nuclear tests. The turret is located 86 miles NNW of Las Vegas (Lat 37.139455, Long -116.109085).

== Awards ==
Louisville was awarded 13 battle stars for her service during World War II.

== Bibliography ==
- Anon (1946). Man of War: Log of the United States Heavy Cruiser Louisville. Philadelphia: Dunlap Printing Co.
- Fahey, James C. (1941). The Ships and Aircraft of the U.S. Fleet, Two-Ocean Fleet Edition. Ships and Aircraft.
- Silverstone, Paul H (1965). US Warships of World War II. Annapolis, Maryland: Naval Institute Press. ISBN 0-87021-773-9.
