= Man O'War Steps =

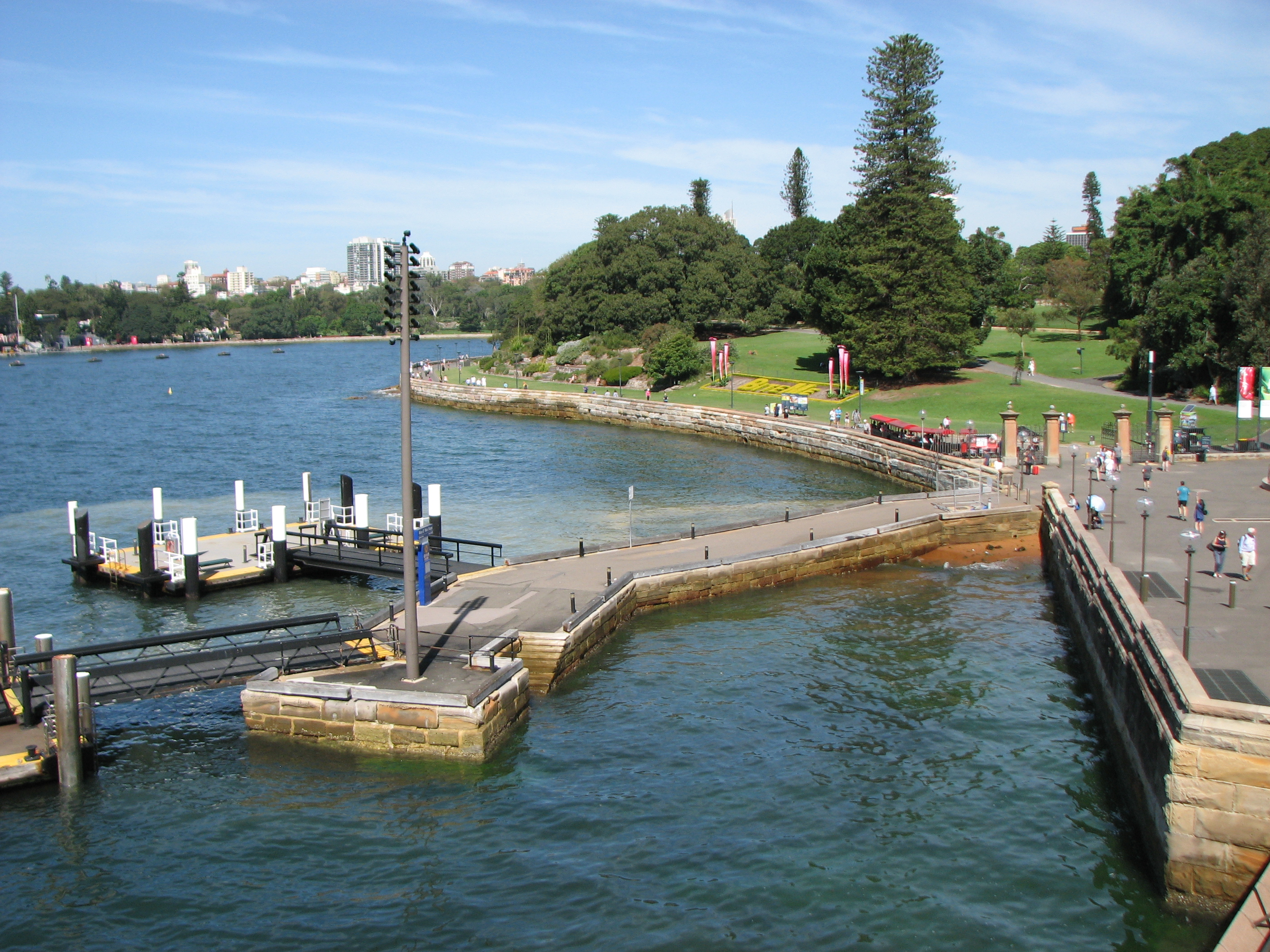
- Man O'War Steps, Sydney, in 2019, from Opera House steps

- Location within Sydney Location within Australia
- 33.8579°S 151.2158°E
- Location: Farm Cove Crescent, Bennelong Point, Sydney, New South Wales, Australia

History
- Built: 1810–

Site notes
- Owner: Transport for NSW

New South Wales Heritage Register
- Official name: Man O'War Steps
- Type: State heritage (built)
- Designated: 18 April 2000
- Reference no.: 1432
- Type: Pier/Jetty
- Category: Transport – Water

The Man O'War Steps is a heritage-listed jetty located at Farm Cove Crescent, in the Sydney central business district, in the City of Sydney local government area of New South Wales, Australia. It was built from 1810. The property is owned by Transport for NSW. It was added to the New South Wales State Heritage Register on 18 April 2000. The Steps are located on the eastern bank of Bennelong Point, adjacent to the Sydney Opera House and on the north-western boundary of the Royal Botanic Garden.

== History ==
"On December 17, 1817, Governor Macquarie laid the foundation stone of the fort now bearing his name. Prior to this, he had built for his private use a small landing place known as Man O'War Steps. In the '50s, female immigrants were landed at Man O'War Steps and marched through the Gardens and the Domain to their barracks."

— "Bennelong Point and Fort Macquarie", in RAHS Journal. n.d.

This 'small landing place' appears to have been a wooden construction of approximately the same configuration as the existing jetty. It enclosed a small beach and protected boat harbour, which became known temporarily as "Port Lachlan," after Macquarie's son Lachlan.

Gradually the jetty was repaired and improved, and ceased to be reserved for the exclusive use of the Governor. By 1850, it was referred to by the Admiralty as a "stone pier," and stated to be in use for watering shipping anchored nearby. This shipping often and sometimes chiefly comprised warships, hence the name by which the jetty and steps are now known - although it has not been possible to ascertain when it started to be called thus. It was probably towards the end of the 1860s.

A prolonged and confused disagreement between the NSW Colonial (and subsequently State) and Imperial Governments, the Royal Navy, Royal Australian Navy, Australian Government, Sydney Harbour Trust and Maritime Services Board (MSB), subsequently arose over responsibility for the Steps (as they became principally known), particularly over maintenance and policing. It continued for the best part of 120 years. The MSB file shows that a final resolution had not been determined as late as 1971, and the MSB's researches of that year refer to a government General Order of 1812 and to correspondence going back to 1850s. Whilst these various authorities were arguing, major construction and maintenance seems to have been undertaken by the NSW Public Works Department and its colonial predecessors; the cost often reimbursed but sometimes not by the naval authorities.

For many years, the principal usage of the Steps was for naval purposes: liberty boats, watering and stores handling, embarkation of crews, etc. However, merchant vessels appear also to have made much use of the jetty, and about the 1890s, Sydney Ferries Limited seem to have used it as an occasional city terminus. From an early date, the little harbour enclosed at the west of the jetty was used by watermen, and later by commercial launches. The jetty and adjoining foreshores were Domain and Gardens, and picnickers from the delightful park at the tip of Fort Macquarie.

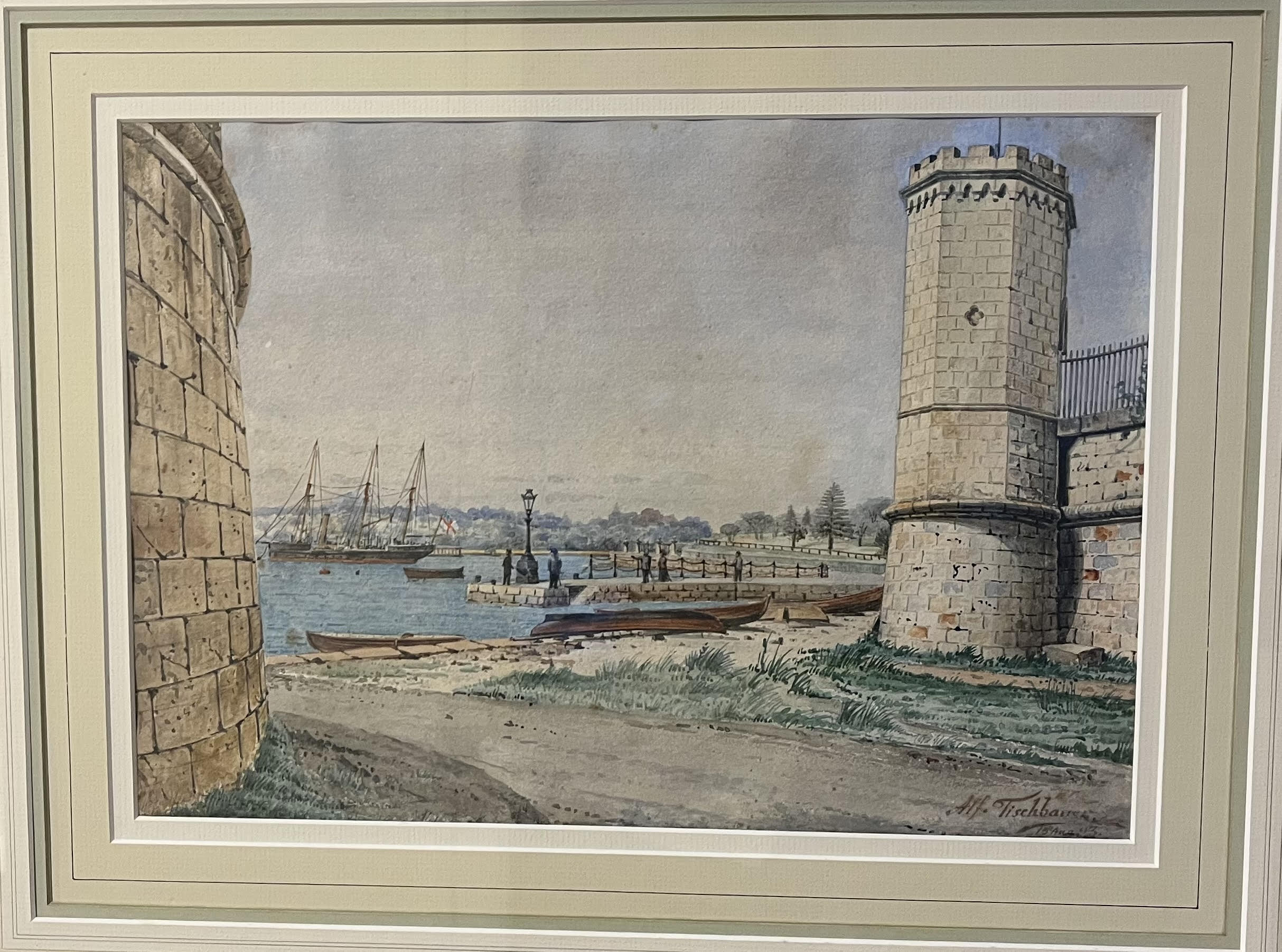
Fort Macquarie & Man of War Steps; Alfred Tischbauer, watercolour, 13 August 1893

The entire precinct was destroyed in the course of the construction of the Sydney Opera House, but the jetty and steps survived. It was rebuilt in the early 1970s and reopened in 1973. Memorial plaques on the stone pillars on each side of the seawall entrance commemorate its history, particularly in the Naval context. At various times, wooden wharves and pontoons were added to the stone jetty, and a substantial wooden shed built at the shore end. The latter was intended chiefly for naval purposes, but was used also as a waiting shed for ferry passengers. In 1902, Rear Admiral Beaumont, RN, described the waiting room as "the habitual resort of idlers." The following year, Capt. GH Field also complained of the "idlers" – "especially those disreputable ones of the female sex who make it a most objectionable waiting place for the wives of Officers and Men."

After the clean sweep of the Opera House construction, pontoons have reappeared as appendages to the old stone jetty. The complex is now a major embarkation point for harbour cruises, and may be expanded. Naval use has now ceased, with expansion of alongside facilities for major warships at Garden Island. It is however principally as a naval landing/embarkation place that Man O'War Steps has its place in history, and this is commemorated by the memorial plaques on the entrance pillars.

== Description ==
A masonry, bitumen topped pier projecting in a dog-leg to the north-west, enclosing a sheltered landing for small craft, with a flight of stone steps to water level at the inner extremity. Original construction dating from 1810–20 and improved/replaced over subsequent years. Majority of existing structure probably part of Farm Cove seawall work of 1860s.

A plaque installed on the northern entrance to the pier pays tribute to the importance of the steps as the landing and embarkation point for men of the British and Australian fleets for 150 years. It also honours those from the Royal Australian Navy who served during World War I, World War II, Korea, Malaya and Vietnam and did not return. The plaque was rededicated on 13 April 2003. The plaque reads:

MAN O`WAR STEPS

This landing area, erected for the Royal Navy, was taken over by the Royal Australian Navy in 1913. For 150 years, Man O`War Steps served as a landing and embarkation point for men of the British and Australian Fleets in peace And war.
From these steps 2,215 officers and sailors of the Royal Australian Navy left to serve their country in the Great War 1914–1918, the Second World War 1939–1945, Korea, Malaya and Vietnam, never to return to enjoy the fruits of their labours in their native land.
Ye who tread their footsteps, remember their glory.

Erected by the Naval Association of Australia 30th January, 1983.

A plaque was also installed on the southern entrance to the pier, dedicated on 20 October 1973, that detailed the history of the pier:

Man O’War Steps

In conjunction with the official opening of the Sydney Opera House in 1973, the stone jetty known as Man O’War Steps, was restored jointly by The Department of Public Works and the Maritime Services Board when a ramp and berthing pontoon were added to the structure.
The stone jetty is situated near the site of the private landing steps built during the administration of Major General Lachlan Macquarie Governor (1810–1821) and for a period formed one of the walls of a small boat harbour named "Watering Place" and no doubt was used by vessels at anchorage in Farm Cove, to obtain water supplies.
The use of the jetty for the movement of personnel and stores to and from Naval vessels moored in the Man O’War anchorage nearby began early last century and the facilities continued to be used by the Royal Australian Navy until work on the present reconstruction commenced.

W. H. Brotherson C.B.E.
President
The Maritime Services Board of N.S.W.

The Hon. L.A. Punch M.L.A.
Minister for Public Works N.S.W.
20th October 1973.

=== Condition ===
As at 1 June 1998, the present condition is good.

=== Modifications and dates ===
Original construction dating from 1810–20 and improved/replaced over subsequent years. Majority of existing structure probably part of Farm Cove seawall work of 1860s. At various times, wooden wharves and pontoons were added to the stone jetty, and a substantial wooden shed built at the shore end. The latter was intended chiefly for naval purposes, but was used also as a waiting shed for ferry passengers. After the clean sweep of the Opera House construction, pontoons have reappeared as appendages to the old stone jetty. The complex is now a major embarkation point for harbour cruises, and may be expanded. The Jetty was restored in 1973 by the Public Works Department and the Maritime Services Board when a ramp and berthing pontoon were added.

== Heritage listing ==
As at 8 December 1998, The only known remains of Macquarie-era harbour works still in existence in Sydney Harbour, in what appears to be its original configuration, and still in daily use. A valuable relic of the "Old Navy" days when men of war anchored in Farm Cove and when waterman plied on the harbour. Also the source of one of the longest-running bureaucratic correspondences in the history of NSW.

The Man O'War Steps was listed on the New South Wales State Heritage Register on 18 April 2000 having satisfied the following criteria.

The place is important in demonstrating the course, or pattern, of cultural or natural history in New South Wales.

Of historical significance for its association with activities of early and more recent naval usage of the jetty which has made an important contribution to the naval settlement and activities on Sydney Harbour.

The place is important in demonstrating aesthetic characteristics and/or a high degree of creative or technical achievement in New South Wales.

Of environmental significance, the stone jetty forms an important part of the harbour in the vicinity of the Opera House and Botanic Gardens at Farm Cove.

The place has a strong or special association with a particular community or cultural group in New South Wales for social, cultural or spiritual reasons.

Further assessment required.

The place has potential to yield information that will contribute to an understanding of the cultural or natural history of New South Wales.

Further assessment required.

== See also ==
- Bennelong Point
- Sydney Opera House
