= Albert Street Uniting Church =

Heritage-listed building in Brisbane, Queensland

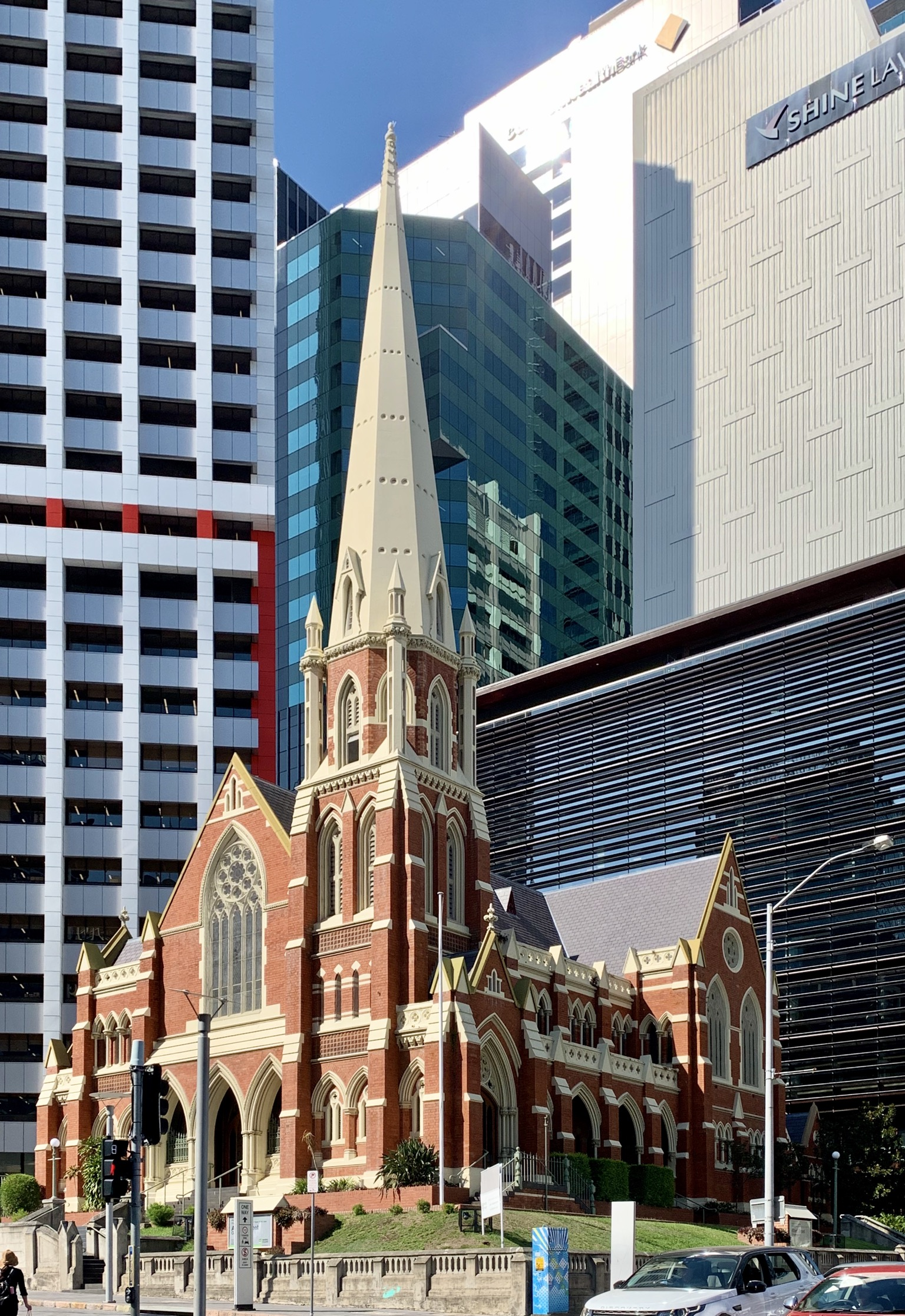
- Albert Street Uniting Church, 2020
- Albert Street Uniting Church
- 27.4678°S 153.0238°E
- Address: 319 Albert Street, Brisbane City, Queensland
- Country: Australia
- Denomination: Uniting (since 1977)
- Previous denomination: Methodist (1888–1977)
- Website: albertstreet.church

History
- Former names: Albert Street Methodist Church; Central Methodist Mission
- Status: Church
- Founded: 18 August 1888
- Dedicated: 8 November 1889

Architecture
- Functional status: Active
- Architect: George Henry Male Addison
- Architectural type: Church
- Style: Gothic Revival
- Years built: 1888–1889
- Construction cost: £10,000

Specifications
- Materials: Red brick; limestone; slate

Administration
- Parish: Albert Street, Brisbane

Queensland Heritage Register
- Official name: Albert Street Uniting Church; Albert Street Methodist Church
- Type: State heritage (built)
- Designated: 21 October 1992
- Reference no.: 600066
- Significant period: 1888–1889 (fabric)
- Significant components: Memorial – window, tower, furniture/fittings, pipe organ, memorial – honour board/ roll of honour, stained glass window/s
- Builders: Thomas Pearson & Sons

Albert Street Uniting Church is a heritage-listed Uniting church at 319 Albert Street (on the corner of Ann Street), Brisbane City, City of Brisbane, Queensland, Australia. It was designed by George Henry Male Addison and built from 1888 to 1889 by Thomas Pearson & Sons. It was originally known as Albert Street Methodist Church and Central Methodist Mission. It was added to the Queensland Heritage Register on 21 October 1992.

== History ==
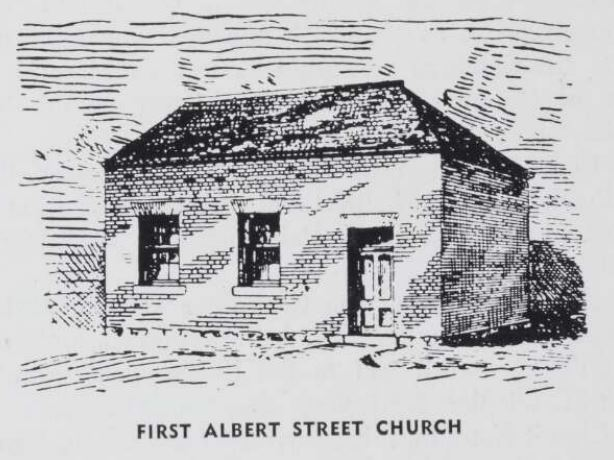
First Methodist church, 1849-1856

=== First Methodist church ===
The first Methodist church in Brisbane, a modest brick chapel, was constructed in 1848–49 at a cost of £150, on the corner of Albert Street and Burnett Lane. Many of the bricks and stone used in its construction had come from a demolished building on the corner of Queen and Edward Streets. It was opened on 10 March 1849, with the first service conducted by a Presbyterian minister, Rev. Thomas Mowbray. The building measured 35 feet long and 18 feet wide, and could seat 150 people. A parsonage was also built in 1849 behind the church facing Burnett Lane, and originally consisted of only two rooms, with two additional rooms added later.

=== Second Methodist church ===
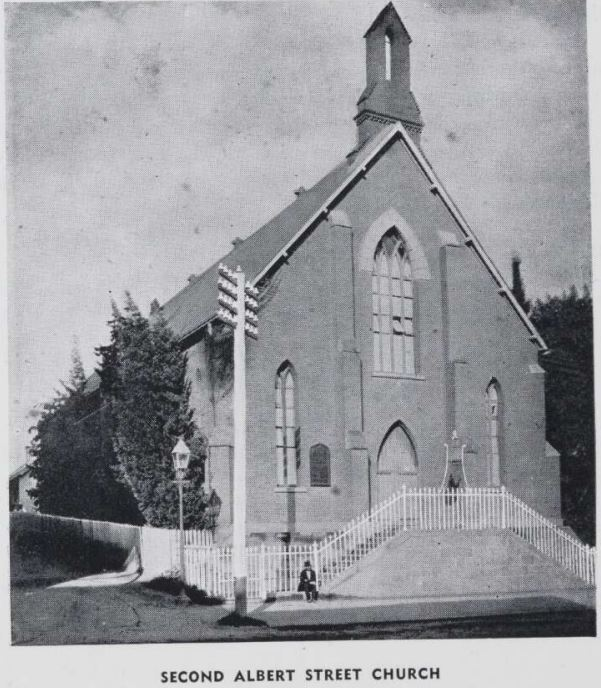
Second Methodist Church, 1856-1889

The first church was replaced in 1856 by a larger building. It was built by Joshua Jeays, who also built Parliament House and the first stage of Old Government House. It cost £2667, was 80 feet long by 40 feet wide, and could seat 500 people. This building had stained glass windows, some of which were transferred to the current church building. Several pews from the first building were kept, whilst additional pews were crafted for the second building. These pews are now located in the gallery of the current church building. The first service in the second building was conducted on 6 December 1856 by Rev. John Eggleston. In 1878, work was done on this building to replace the roof shingles with slate, add a gallery along the Albert Street side, and install a pipe organ built by James Cole of Manchester. This pipe organ was moved to St Thomas' Anglican Church in North Ipswich in 1892.

=== Third Methodist church ===
By the early 1880s the congregation had grown substantially and in 1884 purchased a site on the corner of Albert and Ann Streets. A competition was held for the design of a new church which was won by G H M Addison. The third church was built for a cost of £10,000 by contractor Thomas Pearson & Sons. Other tradespeople included Petrie & Son (joinery), and Exton and Gough (stained glass windows). In keeping with the importance placed on music in Methodism, a large pipe organ was installed. It was built by George Benson of Manchester for a cost of £1,000. Five foundation stones were laid by prominent congregation members on 18 August 1888. These members were John Sargent Turner, member of the Queensland Legislative Council, Sir Arthur Rutledge, member of the QLC (Rutledge also laid the foundation stone for Albert Hall next to the church in 1901 when he was Attorney-General of Queensland), Frederick Thomas Brentnall, member of the QLC and former minister at Albert Street Church, Mr R. Edwards (possibly Richard Edwards), and Mr. C. M. Foster. The church was officially opened on 8 November 1889 by Lady Alice Norman, the wife of the Governor of Queensland, Sir Henry Norman.

In the 1920s, a marble honour board was erected in the front entrance vestibule commemorating the members of the congregation who served in World War I. Additional stained glass windows were installed as memorials in 1944 and 1947. Restoration work was undertaken in 1974–75 and involved the replacement of the slate roof. Further repair work on the building has been undertaken over the years.

In 1907, the church became known as the Central Methodist Mission in recognition of its wider responsibilities as the main Methodist church in the city. The congregation has been involved in a variety of welfare activities and has developed an extensive network of accommodation and other services for aged people.

On Thursday 1 March 1928, John Gladwell Wheen, the President-General of the Methodist Church of Australasia, unveiled a memorial tablet for Henry Youngman in the church, a year after Youngman's death.

The church served as the symbolic centre of Methodism in Queensland. The Annual Conference was opened each year in the church and significant occasions for Methodists were celebrated there. With the formation of the Uniting Church in 1977, the church was renamed Albert Street Uniting Church.

== Description ==
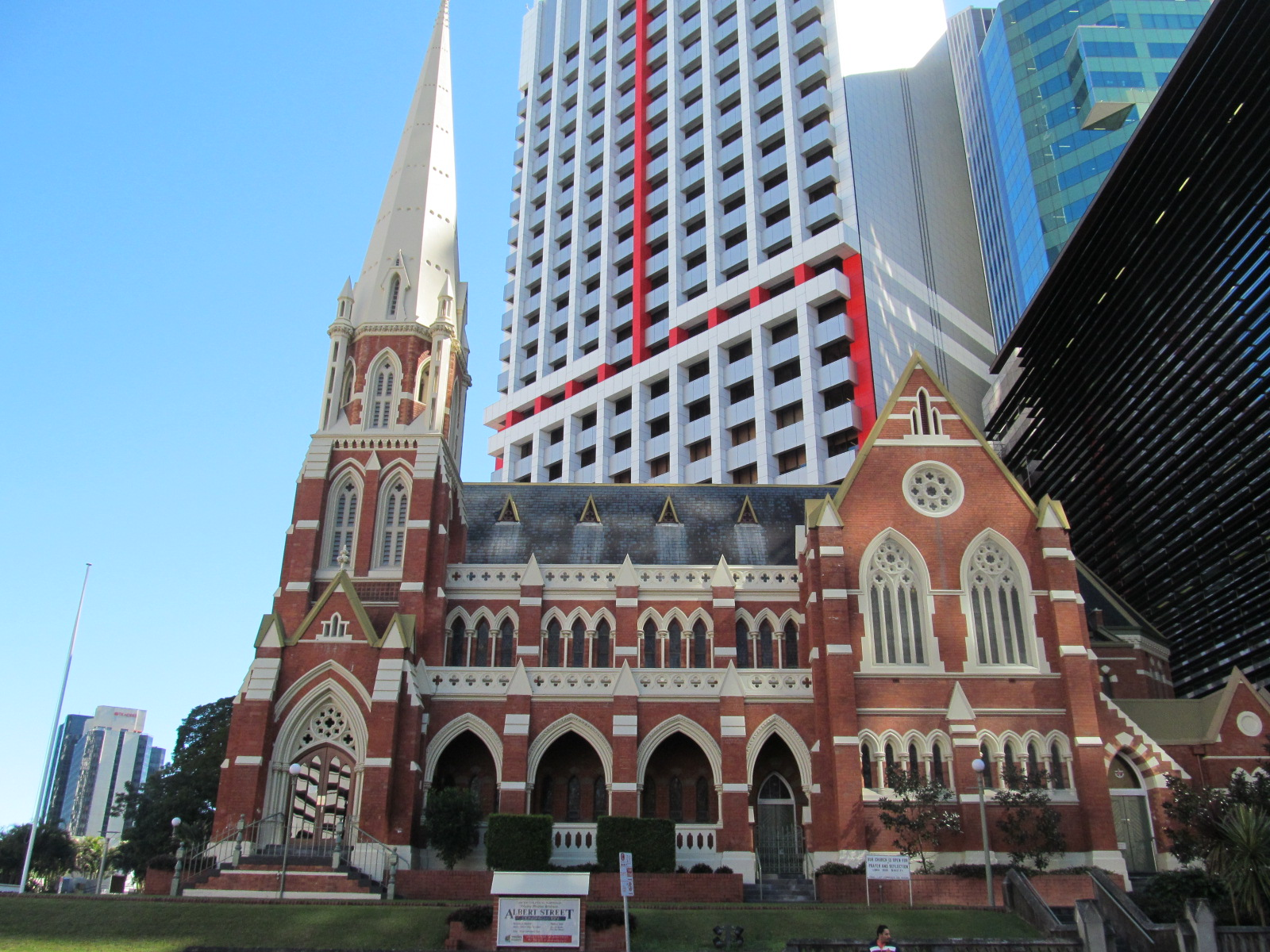
View from Ann Street, 2013

Albert Street Uniting Church is built of red brick, the clay for which was sourced from the Milton area, and has a slate roof (originally Spanish slate, replaced in 2014/15 after it sustained damage in a hailstorm). The trimmings are of white Oamaru limestone, which was painted over during restoration work in the mid-1970's, but which was restored during further renovations in 2026. It is an example of a Victorian Gothic Revival church with its cruciform plan shape, steeply pitched roof forms, the imposing 42 metre tall spire beside the entry, and the heavy buttressing of the facades.

The entry to the church is from an open porch with three Gothic arches at the end of the nave. Similar arcades exist down the sides of the church. A single large Gothic opening with fine tracery is located above the entry porch. To the right of the entry is a tower rising to the octagonal spire which has tall dormers on four of its faces and four pinnacles at the corners of its base. The top of the spire has a wrought iron finial.

The roof on the nave also has small dormer ventilators. A side entry is to the right of the base of the tower and has a broad Gothic arch with a steeply pitched parapet topped by a Christian cross. The end of each transept has a rose window in the gable end above a pair of Gothic arched windows that in turn are above groups of smaller openings.

Internally, the nave floor slopes down towards the pulpit and the walls are rendered, with a timber boarded dado. The galleries contain tiered seating and are supported on cast iron columns with ornate capitals. The main ceiling and gallery soffits are diagonally boarded and finely carved timberwork is incorporated into the gallery railings, roof structure and furnishings.

The focus of the interior is the pulpit and organ. The pulpit is raised several metres above the floor, and reflects the importance in the Methodist tradition that was given to preaching. Above and behind the pulpit is a large decoratively painted pipe organ which reflects the value placed by Methodists on music and singing.

== Heritage listing ==
Albert Street Uniting Church was listed on the Queensland Heritage Register on 21 October 1992 having satisfied the following criteria.

Demonstrating the evolution or pattern of Queensland's history.

- As an excellent example of a Victorian Gothic Revival church, climatically adapted with side colonnades and front porch; and internally a good example of the major attributes of the Methodist tradition.
- For its association with the Methodist Church in Queensland
- As a dominant element on the corner of Albert and Ann Streets, and for its contribution to the townscape at King George Square
- As one of the major works of the architect G H M Addison.

Demonstrating the principal characteristics of a particular class of cultural places.

- The church is an excellent example of a Victorian Gothic Revival church, climatically adapted with side colonnades and front porch; and internally a good example of the major attributes of the Methodist tradition.
- As one of the major works of the architect G H M Addison.

Aesthetic significance.

- As a dominant element on the corner of Albert and Ann Streets, and for its contribution to the townscape at King George Square.

Strong or special association with a particular community or cultural group for social, cultural or spiritual reasons.

- For its association with the Methodist Church in Queensland.

== List of ministers ==
Superintendent ministers

Name	Image	Tenure	Notes
William Moore (24 March 1821, Parramatta, Sydney - 12 September 1893, Stanmore, Sydney)		October 1847–December 1849	Conducted his first service in Brisbane on 24 October 1847 one week after arriving. Oversaw the construction of the first Albert Street church building from 1848–49. Father of Samuel Wilkinson Moore.
William Lightbody (1818, Armagh, Ireland - 13 March 1879, near Portland, Victoria)		1850	
John Watsford (5 December 1820, Parramatta, Sydney - 24 July 1907, Kew, Melbourne)		1850–1851	First Australian-born Methodist minister appointed to Queensland (Moore was not an ordained minister when he first arrived in Brisbane).
John Gane Millard (25 September 1827, Frome, England - 17 June 1897, Launceston, Tasmania)		1851–1854	
William Jones Killick Piddington (26 March 1830, London, England - 14 June 1897, Tamworth, New South Wales)		1855–1858	Oversaw the construction of the second Albert Street church building in 1856. Later Anglican Archdeacon of Tamworth 1880–1897. Father of William Henry Piddington and Albert Bathurst Piddington. Grandfather of Ralph Piddington and great-grandfather of Jack Piddington.
Samuel Wilkinson (31 July 1813, Bishop Auckland, England - 27 December 1899, Petersham, Sydney)		1858–April 1861	
Joseph Horner Fletcher (1 October 1823, Saint Vincent, Saint Vincent and the Grenadines - 30 June 1890, Stanmore, Sydney)		1861–1864	President of Newington College in Sydney from 1865-87. Father of Joseph James Fletcher and Norman Vyner Fletcher. Nephew of William George Horner. Uncle of Charles Brundson Fletcher, Michael Scott Fletcher, and Lionel B. Fletcher.
Theophilus Beazley (14 December 1833, Staffordshire, England - 15 February 1908, Orange County, California, USA)		1864–1868	
Isaac Harding (20 February 1815, Wanstrow, England - 17 July 1897, Bowen Hills, Brisbane)		1868–1871	Founded the Methodist book depot in Brisbane in 1872.
William George Taylor (18 January 1845, Knayton, England - 24 September 1934, Lindfield, Sydney)		1871–1874	Later the Superintendent minister of the Central Methodist Mission in Sydney c. 1907.
Frederick Thomas Brentnall (17 June 1834, Riddings, England - 11 January 1925, Coorparoo, Brisbane)		1874–1877	Husband of Elizabeth Brentnall née Watson.
William Alexander Wilson (1843, Saint Lucia - 24 October 1901, Redfern, Sydney)		1877–1879	
Dr. Richard Sellors, D.D. (11 May 1835, Winster, England - 15 June 1915, Lindfield, Sydney)		1879–1882	President of the New South Wales and Queensland Conference of the Australasian Wesleyan Methodist Church sometime prior to March 1893. President of the Queensland Conference of the Australasian Wesleyan Methodist Church in March 1893.
Matthew Henry Parkinson (23 February 1840, Lincolnshire, England - 30 May 1906, Gordon, Sydney)		1882–1885	
James Adams Nolan (11 November 1837, Greencastle, Ireland - 17 April 1904, New South Wales, Australia)		1885–1888	Husband of Sara Susan Nolan. Father of Howard Henry Nolan and Percy Leonard Nolan.
Henry Youngman, D.D. (29 December 1848, Kidderminster, England - 11 March 1927, Toowong, Brisbane)		1888–1891	Considered "the Father of Methodism in Queensland". Oversaw the construction of the third and current Albert Street church building from 1888–89. President of the Queensland Methodist Conference in 1893, 1898, and 1907. President-General of the Methodist Church of Australasia from 1910-13. Brother of Reverend Edward Youngman, who was President of the Queensland Methodist Conference in 1895. Brother-in-law of John Laskey Woolcock.
Arthur John Webb (1845, Sevenoaks, England - 30 July 1899, Burwood, Sydney)		1892–1895	
Joseph Bowes (1852, Camden, Sydney - 27 March 1928, Greenslopes, Brisbane)		1895–1898	Also Secretary of the Queensland Methodist Conference in 1893. President of the Queensland Methodist Conference in 1903. Son of Euphemia Bridges Bowes née Allen. Brother-in-law of Peter Board and uncle of Ruby Board.
Charles Edward James (1859, Kingston upon Hull, England - 16 May 1936, Wahroonga, Sydney)		1899–1902	
Joseph Snell (1 November 1864, Boconnoc, England - 5 August 1939, Geelong, Victoria)		1902–April 1906	Married Violet Rabone Rutledge, a daughter of Sir Arthur Rutledge.
George Edwards Rowe, D.D., V.D. (26 August 1858, Scorrier, England - 27 October 1926, Nundah, Brisbane)		April 1906–October 1926	Established the Central Methodist Mission in 1907, which would eventually become Wesley Mission Queensland. Also President of the Queensland Methodist Conference in 1910. Died of a heart attack whilst minister at Albert Street Methodist Church. Army chaplain during World War I, reaching the rank of Colonel. Father-in-law of Donald Brumwell, President of the Queensland Methodist Conference in 1937.
Albert Taylor (23 August 1868, Sheffield, England - 22 August 1948, Brisbane, Queensland)		1926-1927	Temporarily appointed after the death of Reverend Rowe.
Harold Manuel Wheller OBE (26 January 1882, Tarlee, South Australia - 17 November 1979, Auchenflower, Brisbane)		1927–1952	Also President of the Queensland Methodist Conference in 1926. President-General of the Methodist Church of Australasia from 1941-45. Wheller on the Park Retirement Village in Chermside is named after him.
George Nash OBE (10 April 1905, Berkley, England - 4 February 2003, Jindalee, Brisbane)		1952–1976	Nephew-in-law of William Jolly.
Raymond Fletcher Hunt OBE (about 1928, Sydney, New South Wales - 18 July 2017, Queensland)		1976–1994	Minister when Albert Street Methodist Church joined the new Uniting Church in Australia in 1977. Also Moderator of the Uniting Church in Queensland from 1985–1986.
Dr. William Duncan Adams (10 June 1930 - 30 June 2024, Queensland)		1994–2000	
Dr. David Pitman AM		2000–2005	Also Moderator of the Uniting Church in Queensland from 1996–1999 and 2005–2008, the only person to hold this position twice.
Lynette Burden OAM (b. 26 September 1950)		2006–2018	First female superintendent minister of Albert Street Uniting Church.
Dr. Peter Hobson (b. 2 April 1969, Townsville, Queensland)		2018–2024	

Congregational and Supernumerary ministers

Name	Image	Tenure	Notes
William Fursman (about 1819, England - 23 June 1884, Sydney, New South Wales)		c. 1840s-1850s	A Corporal in the 12th Regiment of Foot who led Methodist services before the official appointment of a Methodist preacher, so most likely the first person to lead Methodist services in Queensland. He later became a Methodist minister. Fursman Park in Enoggera Reservoir and Fursman Crossing Park in The Gap are named after his family, who farmed land in the area.
George Frederick Poole (1822 - 6 April 1853, Brisbane, Queensland)		1848-1853	Appointed as Circuit Steward at the first Albert Street Wesleyan Church Quarterly meeting on 30 June 1848. Worked as a druggist and grocer in Brisbane. His father, George Poole (d. 21 July 1856), was a retired minister who was also involved in the early church.
Nathaniel Turner (March 1793, Wybunbury, England - 16 December 1864, Brisbane, Queensland)		1855-1864	Father of John Sargent Turner. Father-in-law of William Graham and Henry Jordan. Grandfather of May Jordan McConnel.
William Henry Knowles (1828, Birmingham, England - 6 January 1905, Chichester, England)		c. 1850's-1870's	One of his sons, Samuel Knowles, married Emily Barnes, a daughter of Hiram Barnes.
Charles Olden (near Birmingham, England, May 1842 - 2 May 1888, New South Wales)		1864-1865	
Henry Woodhouse (27 October 1835, West Yorkshire, England - 19 May 1913, Lindfield, Sydney)		c. 1866-1868	
Henry John Lavers (9 March 1810, Kingsbridge, England - 5 April 1887, Brisbane, Queensland)		c. 1868-1871	
Richard Watson Orton (3 April 1833, New South Wales - 29 September 1895, New South Wales)		c. 1868-1871	Uncle-in-law of Reverend Arthur Webb (above).
Thomas Benson Rootes (27 September 1843, Camden, Sydney - 10 April 1877, New South Wales)		c. 1868-1871	
Joseph Spence (d. 6 May 1909, Sydney, New South Wales)		c. 1873-1876	
Alfred Midgley (24 February 1849, Leeds, England - 25 February 1930, Corinda, Brisbane)		1876-1878	Also a member of the Queensland Legislative Assembly from 1883-87.
Paul Clipsham (about 1850, Bardney, England - 20 November 1924, Gilgandra, New South Wales)		c. 1877	
R. Allen		c. 1879	
H. Jones		c. 1879-1882	
C. Terry		c. 1879-1882	
William Henry Harrison (5 July 1860, Richmond, Melbourne - 26 April 1947, Brisbane, Queensland)		c. 1882	Also Assistant Secretary of the Queensland Methodist Conference in 1893. Secretary of the Queensland Methodist Conference from 1901–04 and 1910. President of the Queensland Methodist Conference in 1905. A set of stained glass windows in the church are dedicated to him and his wife Evangeline.
John Hulme (about 1857 - 23 July 1941, Sydney, New South Wales)		c. 1885	
Thomas Brassington (1857, Yorkshire, England - 4 December 1928, Brisbane, Queensland)		c. 1889	Also President of the Queensland Methodist Conference in 1910 and 1912.
William Halse Rogers (about 1851, Hartland, England - 25 June 1924, Ashfield, Sydney)		c. 1889	President of the New South Wales Methodist Conference sometime before 1905. Father of Sir Percival Halse Rogers.
George Woolnough, MA (17 August 1834, Erriswell, England - 19 June 1929, Queensland)		c. 1893-1903	
W. Penfold Brown		April 1907-?	Army chaplain at Enoggera Army Camp during World War I.
Professor Hubert Hedley Trigge, MA, BD (6 July 1889, Clifton Hill, Melbourne - 21 March 1965, Queensland)		c. 1930's	Army chaplain during World War I, reaching the rank of Lieutenant. Master of King's College, The University of Queensland 1924-59.
Francis Chowns (about 1890 - 3 July 1973)		c. 1958	President of the Queensland Methodist Conference c. 1951.
Joseph William Evans (15 March 1916, Queensland - 10 March 1997, Chermside, Queensland)		c. 1960's-70's	Chaplain at Wheller Gardens from 1980-85.
Murray Ross Fysh		c. 2001	Also Manager of the Pastoral Care Department of the Wesley Hospital c. 2013
Anne Hulbert		?-2011	
Daniel Skippen		2011–2020	
Melanie Wheeley (b. 5 January, Brisbane, Queensland)		2020-2024	
Brian Hoole (b. 1962, Melbourne, Victoria)		2024-current	
Amy Yang (b. about 1978, Taiwan)		2025-current	

== See also ==
- Albert Hall
