= Kessing =

Kessing is a surname. Notable people with the surname include:

- Kaye Kessing (born 1950), Australian children's writer and book illustrator
- Oliver Kessing (1890–1963), American football executive
- Kerrie C. Kessing (born 1969), American attorney at law whose practice has a strong focus in animal advocacy.
