= Henry Youngman (minister) =

Methodist minister in Australia

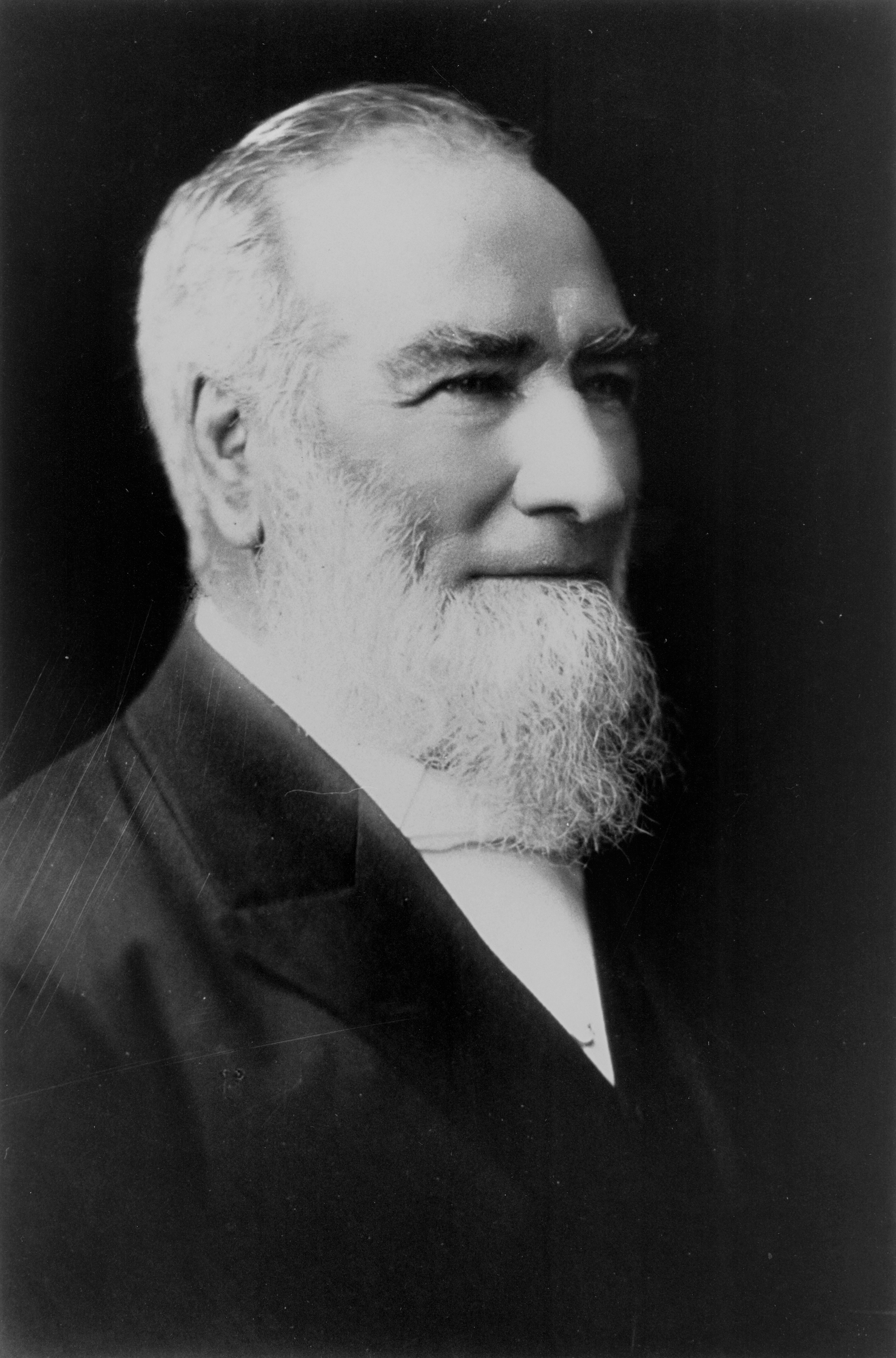
Reverend Henry Youngman

Henry Youngman (1848–1927) was a Methodist minister. He was President-General of the Methodist Church of Australasia and often described as "the Father of Methodism in Queensland".

== Early life ==
Youngman was born in Kidderminster, England in December 1848. As a boy, he immigrated with his parents to Goulburn, New South Wales, where they worshipped at the Wesleyan Church.

== Religious life ==
Under the tuition of the late Rev. William Curnow, the minister of that circuit, Youngman studied to be a preacher, and proved such an apt pupil that in 1871 was he appointed minister of the Fish River circuit, with residence at Oberon. The following year he was sent to Deniliquin, and then spent two years as second minister of the Mudgee circuit. He spent three years in Tamworth, followed by terms in Adelong, Newtown, Ashfield and Wollongong.

At the end of 1887, in his absence, the Methodist Conference appointed him to the Albert Street circuit in Brisbane — he learned of his appointment when he opened the morning paper at his breakfast-table. He served at Albert Street from 1888 to 1892, during which he was involved in the sale of the old site and the purchase of its replacement. From Brisbane he went to Toowoomba (1891 to 1893), then to Toowong (1893–1896), and following that to Ipswich (1896–1899), Gympie (1900–1903), and West End, Brisbane (1904–1906). In 1907 he was made connexional secretary, a post he held practically up to the time of his death.

When Youngman came to Brisbane in 1888 he saw the desirability of a Conference to bring together the different denominations of Methodism, and he lost no chance of urging for this. His efforts were rewarded in time, and when in 1890 the Conference was established, he was elected its first president. In 1898 he was again called to the chair. He was active in trying to unite the Wesleyan Methodists and Primitive Methodists in Queensland, contributing to the formation of the Methodist Church of Australasia in 1902 which amalgamated a number of previously separate Methodist denominations. He was active in the Queensland Council of Churches, and was elected its president in 1905.

In 1907 he was elected Secretary of the Methodist General Conference, and in 1910 was elected President-General of the Methodist Church of Australasia. Eleven years were spent in the chair of the connexional editor, first on the Weekly Advocate with Revs. Dr Brown, B. J. Meek, and Paul Clipsham, then its successor, the Methodist, with Clipsham, J. E. Carruthers, A. J. Webb, and the Revs. G. Martin and B. J. Meek. From 1921 to 1924 he was Chairman of the Presbyterian and Methodist Schools Association in Queensland.

Youngman excelled as a preacher and his success in many aspects of Methodist ministry demonstrated that a man could succeed in ministry without the benefit of formal scholastic training. In 1913 the Victoria University of Toronto conferred the degree of Doctor of Divinity on Youngman in recognition of his eminent gifts and conspicuous service to Methodism in Queensland.

== Later life ==
Youngman died at his residence in Dean Street, Toowong, Brisbane, early on Friday 11 March 1927 following several months of illness. As he had requested, it was a quiet funeral. He was buried in Toowong Cemetery on Saturday 12 March 1927. His second wife, three sons and a daughter survived him.

He is commemorated by a memorial tablet in the Albert Street Uniting Church. It was unveiled by John Gladwell Wheen, the President-General of the Methodist Church of Australasia on Thursday 1 March 1928.

His headstone in Toowong Cemetery was removed by the Brisbane City Council in the mid-1970s as part of a program to clean up "unsightly/demolished graves".
