= Kaye Kessing =

Australian writer and illustrator

- Born: Kaye Bronwyn Neal; 27 November 1950 (age 75); Australia
- Education: Adelaide School of Art
- Occupations: Writer; Illustrator; Artist; Environmental advocate
- Notable work: The Bilby's Ring Trilogy, Easter Bilby, Easter Bilby's Secret
- Website: Kaye Kessing's website

Kaye Bronwyn Kessing (née Neal; born 27 November 1950) is a writer and illustrator from Alice Springs in the Northern Territory of Australia. She is best known for her children's books and public artworks including the Coles Mural on Railway Terrace in Alice Springs.

== Early life ==
Kessing's love of nature developed during her childhood, spent on the farm she grew up on, south of Burra in South Australia. There, she helped on the family farm and roamed the nearby hills, learning about the few native animals and plants left in the local farming district.

Kaye graduated from the Adelaide School of Art and moved to Alice Springs to in 1971 to take up a position teaching art & crafts at the Anzac Hill High School.

== Work in the Northern Territory ==
Kessing grew to love both the desert landscapes and the rich diversity of arid land native creatures and plants.

In 1972 Kaye moved to Amata in the APY Lands, in the remote north west of South Australia. For 18 months she taught arts and crafts, hunting and collecting bush tucker on the weekends with the women – greatly increasing her knowledge of the plants and animals. Describing the experience she said "we chased goannas, dug for witchetty grubs and honey ants, collected quandongs, bush plums, figs, bush tomato and heaps more."

A few years later, as part of her sign writing, screen printing and graphic art business with her then partner Bob, Kaye used the local desert landscape, plants and animals on murals, posters, T-shirts designs, a colouring book and a board game called On The Brink the fun endangered board game.

Following consultation with the Alice Springs community, Kaye and Bob designed and painted, with community volunteers, the well-known mural on the rear wall of the Coles shopping centre, completed in 1981. She also painted 'story murals' in the Alice Springs Hospital Children's Ward.

Kaye is also a passionate advocate for managing feral animals. She has written and performed many plays about the local native animals and the environmental problems and damage to native animals by cats, foxes and rabbits. In 1994 Kaye was approached by The Rabbit Free Australia Foundation to write and illustrate a book replacing the feral Easter Rabbit with an Australian native animal, to create awareness about the damage rabbits do to the Australian environments. Kaye co-wrote and illustrated the Easter Bilby picture book with Ali Garnett, which grew into a series of bilby picture books, including the sequel the Easter Bilby's Secret picture book.

Most recently Kessing has published The Bilby's Ring Trilogy launched in Alice Springs in 2015. It is a series of science-based native animals adventure stories that highlight Australian environmental issues investigated through light-hearted narrative, maps, songs and illustrations.

== Major murals and paintings ==
- Alice Springs Hospital Children's Ward
- Coles Supermarket, Railway Terrace Alice Springs
- School of the Air, Alice Springs
- The Battle for the Spinifex touring exhibition of 11 large canvases, telling the story of feral animals spreading across arid Australia. This series now belongs to the people of Alice Springs and is available for educational use from the Alice Springs Town Council

== Publications ==
- 2009–2014 – The Bilby's Ring Trilogy
- 1998 – Easter Bilby's Secret – written and illustrated by Kaye Kessing
- 1994 – Easter Bilby book co-written with Ali Garnett
- 1994 – The Easter Bilby Pantomime for the National Museum of Australia
- 1991–1992 – Spinifex Skeletons and Sewers
- 1986 – Snaffled in the Spinifex
- 1982 – Journey Through Central Australia
