= Coralie Ling =

Australian feminist and minister

The Reverend Coralie Ling

Personal life
- Born: 1939 (age 86–87) Brunswick, Australia
- Known for: First Methodist woman ordained in Victoria (2nd in Australia)

Religious life
- Religion: Christianity (Methodist)

Coralie Ling (born 1939) is an Australian retired Christian minister. She was the second woman ordained in the Methodist Church of Australasia and the first Methodist woman ordained in the state of Victoria. In 1977, she became a minister in the Uniting Church in Australia when it was formed as a merger of Methodist, Congregationalist and Presbyterian churches.

== Life and career ==
Born in Brunswick, Victoria, a suburb of Melbourne, Coralie Ling is the daughter of Stanley and Mavis Ling. She went to Dandenong High School, and later completed a Bachelor of Arts from the University of Melbourne. After graduating, she taught for three years.

Ling was spiritually inclined as a young woman and had been active in youth church groups. After teaching, she decided to study to become a deaconess in the Methodist Church. At that point, the Methodist Church in Australia did not allow the ordination of women to the pastoral ministry. Instead, they had established the order of deaconesses for women interested in serving a pastoral role. Ling completed a Bachelor of Ministry degree and then worked full-time as a deaconess in Ballarat, Victoria.

After years of debate on women's ordination, in 1966, the general council of the Methodist Church in Australia allowed annual conferences (the regional Methodist bodies) to accept women candidates for ministry. These candidates were first accepted in 1968.

Ling was ordained on 23 October 1969. She was the first woman to be ordained in the Methodist Church in the state of Victoria and the second Methodist woman to be ordained in Australia. Her ordination came a few weeks after that of Margaret Sanders in Perth. In 1977, the Methodist Church of Australasia merged with the Congregational and Presbyterian churches to become the Uniting Church in Australia.

In 1991, Ling became the pastor at Fitzroy Uniting Church, in Fitzroy, Victoria. In 1999, she completed a PhD through the Doctor of Ministries in Feminist Theologies Program, a program of the San Francisco Theological Seminary established by feminist theologian Letty Russell.

Ling retired from active ministry in 2005.

In 2019, she was featured in a show called Beachside Stories at the Gasworks Theatre in Albert Park, Victoria. She performed in a brief one-woman act written by Clare Mendes.

== Select publications ==
- Ling, Coralie. "Weaving a Questing Spirituality", Women-Church: Australian Journal of Feminist Studies in Religion, no. 38 (2006): 31–35. Digitised version of no. 38 (2006) available on JSTOR Open Community Collections, University of Divinity Digital Collections, Mannix Library

== See also ==
- Ordination of women
