= William Henry Jones (Methodist) =

William Henry Jones (20 April 1874 – 4 July 1939), commonly referred to as Rev. W. H. Jones, was a Methodist minister in country New South Wales and church executive in Sydney, Australia.

== History ==
Jones was born in "Kingston Cottage", Tamworth, to William, the only son of William Jones, later of Leura, and Letitia Jones, née Peirce, who married at the Methodist Church, Tamworth, on 4 March 1871.

He entered Newington College as a candidate for the ministry, having been nominated by Rev. Richard Sellors DD (1835–1916), general secretary of the Wesleyan Church Sustentation Society. He graduated in 1899, and began as a home missionary in the Riverina district, under the direction of Rev. James Woolnough (1847–1915), general secretary of the Home Mission and Extension Society.

His ministry began in 1901 in the Muswellbrook circuit, followed by Glebe, Bellinger River, then Young, where he was credited with building the Young church, and Temora. In 1916, after four years at Temora, he was appointed Home Mission Secretary, based in Sydney, and became increasingly involved in the Home Mission Department of the Church, serving as General Secretary of the Home Mission and Church Sustentation Society, Custodian of Deeds, Conference Property Secretary, and agent for the Church with the Government. In 1925 he was appointed Home Mission secretary of the NSW Methodist Conference and president of the Conference on 26 February 1930.

At the triennial conference in Adelaide in 1938 he was elected secretary-general of the General Methodist Conference, succeeding Rev A. E. Albiston (1866–1961). He was credited, along with Percy N. Slade (1872–1944) and George W. Cocks (died 1952), with modernizing Methodist policies and organisation in the state. After his removal to the administration arm of the church he took to the pulpit only occasionally, but remained an active member of his local (Lindfield) congregation, attending services every Sunday.

He died at Kempsey after a long illness, and following a service at the Lindfield Methodist Church, his remains were cremated at the Northern Suburbs Crematorium. He would have progressed to president-general in 1941, but the position went instead to Harold M. Wheller of Brisbane.

== Other activities ==
Jones was an enthusiast for inter-faith dialogue, and a participant in the Council of Churches in New South Wales, of which he was elected president in 1935. In his presidential address he was vehement in opposing the then-current preparation for war, and when the Church of England withdrew from the Council, he fought the resolution for it to disband.

== Recognition ==
A stained-glass window to his memory was dedicated by A. E. Albiston at the Lindfield church on 4 February 1940. Another, memorializing his wife, was unveiled on 27 May 1934.

== Family ==
Jones married Mary Wallace (died 12 February 1934) of Newcastle on 22 March 1905. They had four sons and one daughter: (Note: One son was born at Bellingen on 11 January 1906 and two at Young, on 15 May 1908 and 12 May 1910, none identified. Little has been found on the later lives of their children, apart from a hint that Wallace was active in the church, and mentions of Harry's activities in gold prospecting companies.)

- (William) Wallace Jones married Elwyn Doreen Hawkins, daughter of the Hon H. M. Hawkins, on 27 December 1932.
- Bobbie
- Kenneth was engaged to Edith Miller in 1934, but no further details found
- Harry Wallace Jones, became a clerk and mining investor.
- Erica Jones (born 6 August 1918)

Jones married again, to Edith Winnifred Wells Holmes, who was with him at Crescent Head, when he died. She was the daughter of Rev. Thomas Barker Holmes of Lindfield, who died in 1928. Edith Winnifred Wells Jones was a co-executor of Jones's will with Jones's youngest son, Harry Wallace Jones.
