= Methodist Church of Australasia =

Church denomination based in Australia

The Methodist Church of Australasia was a Methodist denomination based in Australia. It existed from 1902 to 1977, when the Uniting Church in Australia was formed. It did missionary work in Australia through two organisations: the Methodist Overseas Mission (founded 1916), which focused mainly on Aboriginal Australians, and the Methodist Inland Mission (founded 1926), which served settler communities in remote parts of Australia.

== History ==
On 1 January 1902, ten years after the publication of Methodist Union in Canada by W. F. James, five Methodist denominations in Australia – the Wesleyan Methodist Church, the Primitive Methodists, the Bible Christian Church, the United Methodist Free and the Methodist New Connexion Churches came together to found a new church. Its organisational structure mainly followed the Wesleyan Methodist Church. This Methodist Church of Australasia established a General Conference, meeting triennially, for Australasia (which then included New Zealand) in 1875, with Annual Conferences in the states.

The church ceased to exist in 1977, when most of its congregations joined with the many congregations of the Congregational Union of Australia and the Presbyterian Church of Australia to form the Uniting Church in Australia.

== Missionary work ==
=== Methodist Overseas Mission ===
The Sydney-based Methodist Missionary Society of Australasia (MMS; 1916–1930s), later named the Methodist Overseas Mission (MOM; 1930s–?) was run by the Methodist Church of Australasia. From around 1916 it established missions in Arnhem Land in northern Australia, moving across the islands from west to east, including Goulburn Island, Milingimbi Island, and Elcho Island, before planning missions on the mainland at Yirrkala (founded 1935) and Caledon Bay. Around this time, MOM was encouraging their senior staff to study anthropology under A. P. Elkin at Sydney University, to learn more about Aboriginal Australian culture, in particular the Yolngu people who lived in Arnhem Land.

Superintendents at Yirrkala included founding superintendent Wilbur Chaseling, Harold Thornell, and Edgar Wells, who wrote about their experiences there. The residents were free to come and go as they wished and the interaction was on the whole positive in those early days, with a lack of dogmatism by the missionaries, and the Yolngu people accommodating Christianity within a version of their own beliefs.

Mitchell Library in Sydney holds records of the Methodist Overseas Mission, including more than 300 boxes of manuscripts; photographs; slides; negatives; and 159 reels of film. The films include the master copy of the documentary film Faces in the Sun (1064), directed by Cecil Holmes for MMS. Others include Man Dark No More (1953) and Man of Two Worlds (1965). These films provide insight into the Stolen Generations brought about by the policies of cultural assimilation pursued by the government of the day.

=== Methodist Inland Mission ===
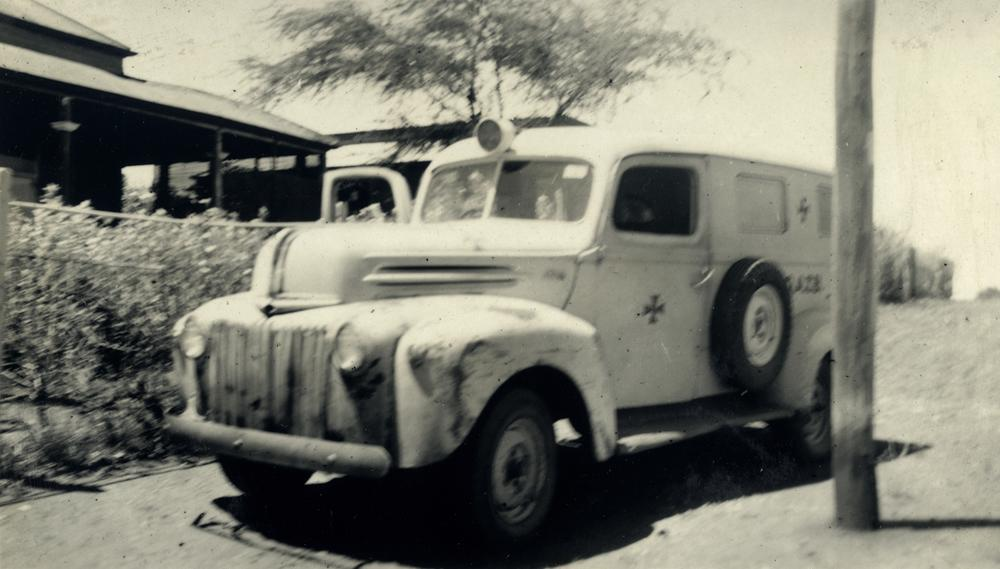
Ambulance Car of the Methodist Inland Mission in Queensland

The Methodist Inland Mission (MIM), also known as the Federal Methodist Inland Mission (FMIM), was missionary organisation of the Methodist Church of Australia that existed between 1926 and 1977. While the Methodist Overseas Mission performed missionary work among Aboriginal people, the Methodist Inland Mission served settler communities in the remote areas of the bush.

The Federal Methodist Inland Mission was established at the General Conference of the Methodist Church of Australasia in Brisbane in May 1926, and had its first board meeting in Melbourne in November of that year. Five ministers were appointed in the first year, two to cover Victoria, and one each to Western Australia, Queensland, and South Australia.

Its first ministers were appointed in regional Queensland, including the towns of Boulia, Cloncurry, and Normanton. Rev. Ernest Ball established the first Methodist Inland mission base at Boulia. In July 1929, the Methodist Hall was transported from the town of Duchess to Mount Isa, and was the first church building.

The aim of the Methodist Inland Mission, which was run by the Methodist Inland Mission Board, was to send missionaries into remote parts of Australia "to implant the Church of Our Lord Jesus Christ". At the beginning, it relied on the work of travelling preachers, who worked in collaboration with the Presbyterian Inland Mission. Much of their work was administering medical help, including conveying people in their ambulances. While their main mission was with white people, they also observed the suffering of many Aboriginal people, and some ministers, in particular Rev. Athol McGregor, championed their cause.

In May 1936, Rev. A. J. Barclay (president-general of the Methodist Church of Australia), at the request of the Methodist Federal Inland Mission Board and the Methodist Overseas Mission Board, was due to travel to every station in the West Australian sector of the Methodist Inland Mission, calling in at Port Hedland, Derby, Broome, Wyndham, and Darwin, by boat, and then, with Rev. S. T. Vickery, whose headquarters are at Port Hedland, travel overland to will travel to Marble Bar, Nullagine, and Roy Hil.

In 1945, Reverend Harry Griffiths was responsible for the creation of Griffiths House in Alice Springs in 1941, originally designed to be a hostel for young single people who had moved to Alice Springs for work, but by the time it was opened, it was converted in to a social club for soldiers stationed in Alice Springs. After the war it became hostel accommodation for children from remote areas of Central Australia so that they could attend school.

After the Methodist Church became part of the Uniting Church of Australia in 1977, Frontier Services took responsibility for the missionary work.

== Methodist Commission on Aboriginal Affairs ==
The Methodist Commission on Aboriginal Affairs (CAA) was established in 1962 as an independent body within the Social Services Department of the Methodist Church, which was run from Melbourne by Rev. Arthur Ellemor. It was formed, among other aims, "to gather information on Aboriginal affairs, study the issues involved and, where needed, to make statements to members of the Methodist Church and the wider community". (Note: Sources differ re start date - this one says in October 1962, but this is contradicted by the next one.) Other aims of the CAA were to ratify Convention 107 of the International Labour Organization concerning the protection and integration of indigenous and other tribal and semi-tribal populations in independent countries.

Dentist and lay preacher John David Jago (6 August 1927 – 30 May 2008) was convener of the Methodist Commission on Aboriginal Affairs for five years. He drew attention to the difficulties faced by Indigenous Australians on a daily basis. He was also actively involved in the Federal Council for the Advancement of Aborigines and Torres Strait Islanders (FCAATSI), and was a member of its executive for two years. Jago had previously been involved with the Aboriginal-Australian Fellowship, and took a lifelong interest in Aboriginal affairs and advocacy. Jago, along with Yirrkala mission superintendent Edgar Wells, was an ally of the Yolngu people in their attempts to be consulted in bauxite mining on the Gove Peninsula, when they submitted the Yirrkala bark petitions and the subsequent court case known as the Gove land rights case (Milirrpum and Others v. Nabalco Pty. Ltd and the Commonwealth of Australia). Arthur Ellemor and the CAA supported the people in their court case, which was decided in 1971 against the Yolngu, with Justice Blackburn finding that aboriginal title had never been legally recognised in Australia.

The body was listed as an "external ally", along with FCAATSI and others, during and following the 1966 Wave Hill Walk-Off, involving the land rights of the Gurindji people in the Northern Territory, which led to a positive outcome eventually under the Whitlam government in 1975.

In the lead-up to the 1967 referendum, the CAA, which favoured greater federal government power in the creation and implementation of Indigenous policy, lobbied alongside FCAATSI, Gordon Bryant, and Joe McGinness for a "Yes" vote.

== Other notable people and activities ==
Yirrkala teacher Ron Croxford, after taking sick leave around the time of the Yirrkala bark petitions in mid-late 1963, returned in March 1964 and received ordination as a minister. He later returned to Victoria with his family and led his own parishes in Melbourne. He was a member of the Aborigines Advancement League from 1966 until 1978, and was an invited guest of the Garma Festival in 2013, the 50th anniversary of the bark petitions.

== Other Methodist congregations ==
There are still independent Methodist congregations in Australia, including congregations formed or impacted by Tongan immigrants. The Wesleyan Methodist Church of Australia is derived from the Wesleyan Methodist Church of America and did not join the Uniting Church in Australia.

== Presidents-General ==
The triennial conference was led by the President-General. There were a total of 25 Presidents General over the life of the Methodist Church of Australasia, from its formation in 1902 until the Uniting Church in 1977.

year	President-General
1902	Rev. George Lane, DD
1904	Rev. William Henry Fitchett BA, LLD
1907	Rev. William Williams DD, FLS
1910	Rev. Henry Youngman
1913	Rev. George Brown DD
1917	Rev. James Edward Carruthers DD
1920	Rev. Alexander McCallum DD
1923	Rev. Edward Holdsworth Sugden MA, BSc, Litt.D
1926	Rev. John Gladwell Wheen
1929	Rev. Frank Lade MA
1932	Rev. Albert Thomas Holden BA, CBE, VD
1935	Rev. Arthur Johnstone Barclay
1938	Rev. Arthur Edward Albiston MA, BD
1941	Rev. Harold Manuel Wheller OBE
1945	Rev. John Wear Burton MA, DD
1948	Rev. Herbert Garfield Secomb DD
1951	Rev. George Calvert Barber CBE, MA, BD, PhD
1954	Rev. Robert Bathurst Lew OBE, ED, BA, DD
1957	Rev. Harold Wood, OBE, MA, DD, DipEd, FACE
1960	Rev. Hubert Hedley Trigge OBE, MA, BD
1963	Rev. William Frank Hambly MA, BD, DD
1966	Rev. Cecil Gribble, OBE, MA, DipEd, LRSM
1969	Rev. Charles Kingston Daws CBE, ED, FASA, FLCS, LCA
1972	Rev. Rex Collis Mathias MA, DipREd.
1975	Rev. Winston D’Arcy O’Reilly OBE, MA, DipSocSci, MACE

== See also ==
- Rupert Grove
- Freer Helen Latham
- Coralie Ling
- Laura Francis (missionary)
