= Harry Griffiths (missionary) =

Methodist minister in Australia (1895–1987)

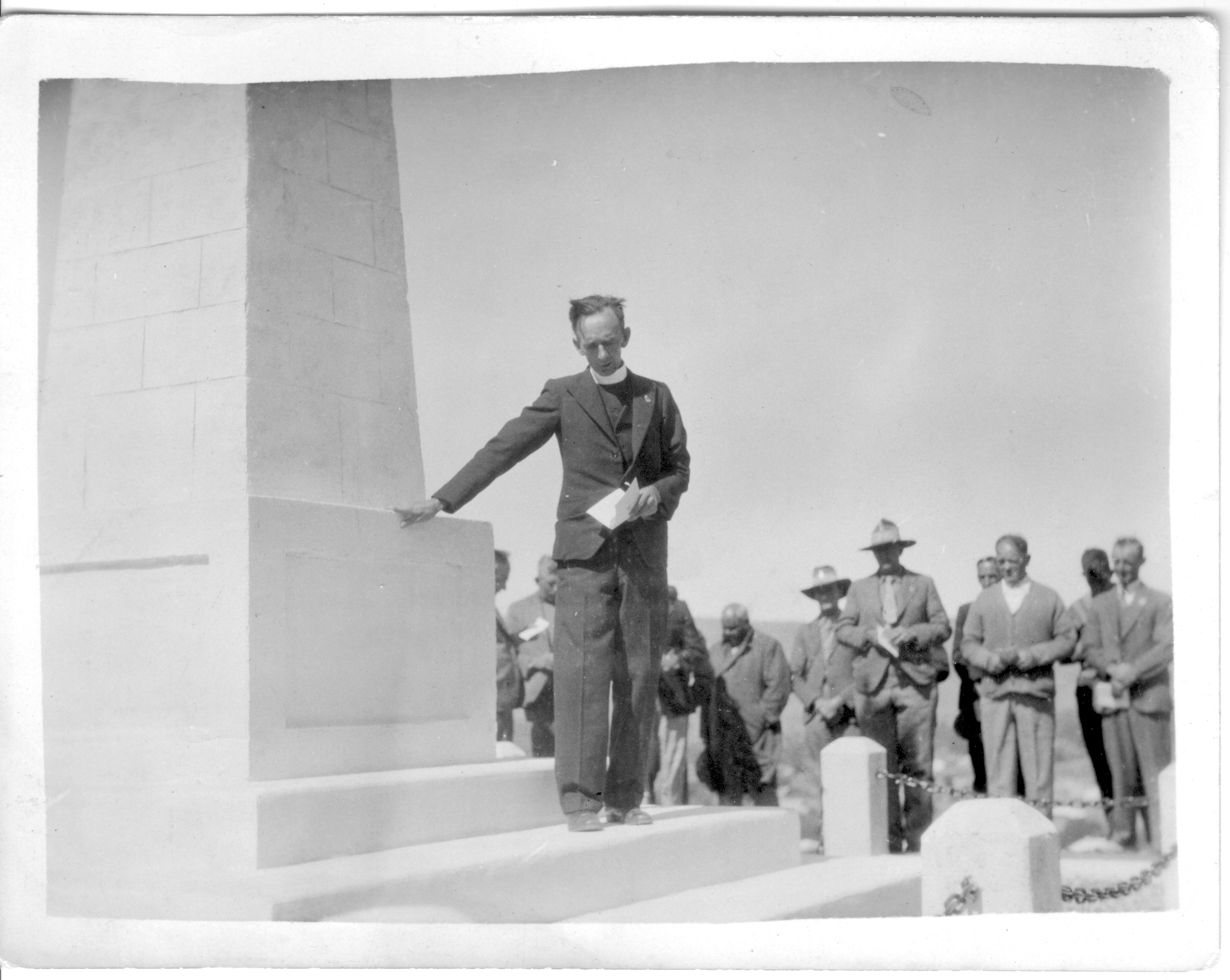
The dedication by Rev. Griffiths (Anzac Hill War Memorial)

Harry Griffiths (1895–1987) was a Christian minister who worked for the Methodist Inland Mission in Alice Springs, Northern Territory, Australia. He is remembered for establishing Griffiths House as well as designing and opening the ANZAC Hill memorial.

== Early life ==
Harry Griffiths was born in England in 1895. He married Dorothy, after he was invalided out of the British Army for injuries received as a medical orderly serving in France during World War I. Griffiths was advised to move to a warmer climate and, not qualifying for assistance, he and Dorothy saved for the fares and initially settled in Melbourne, Australia. When in Melbourne, Griffiths became a home missionary and started the process to become ordained; during this process he was appointed to Katherine, Northern Territory.

== Life in the Northern Territory ==
In Katherine, Griffiths went on patrols in the local area, often assisted by Dorothy, who also helped isolated children with their correspondence lessons and taught Sunday school. The couple lived at the manse, which they frugally furnished with beer cartons and tea crates.

Immediately following Griffiths' ordination, the couple were moved to Alice Springs where, in addition to his work as a minister, he offered medical and dental help; he went as far as to use his International work truck as an ambulance.

Shortly after their arrival Griffiths, as chairman of the trustees of the Returned and Services League of Australia, lobbied for the flat area around (what is now known as) ANZAC Hill to be set aside as a recreational reserve, and also suggested a memorial be erected on top of ANZAC Hill. He designed the memorial and opened and dedicated it with a public address on ANZAC Day, 25 April 1934.

With the outbreak of World War II, Griffiths was commissioned as an army chaplain and during the war worked in the Northern Territory, Victoria, and Palestine. During the war Griffiths started work on the construction of Griffiths House, which was originally designed to be a hostel for young single people who had moved to Alice Springs for work, but by the time it was opened (on 5 July 1941), plans had already changed and it was immediately converted in to a social club for soldiers stationed in Alice Springs. After the war, and opening in 1945, the house was converted to provide hostel accommodation for children from remote areas of Central Australia so that they could attend school.

Griffiths was also chairman of the Alice Springs Progress Association.

== Later life and death ==
Griffiths and his wife left Alice Springs in 1952 and moved to Murray Bridge, South Australia. Griffiths died in 1987, and his ashes were buried at ANZAC Hill.
