= Laura Francis =

Australian Christian missionary (1865–1946)

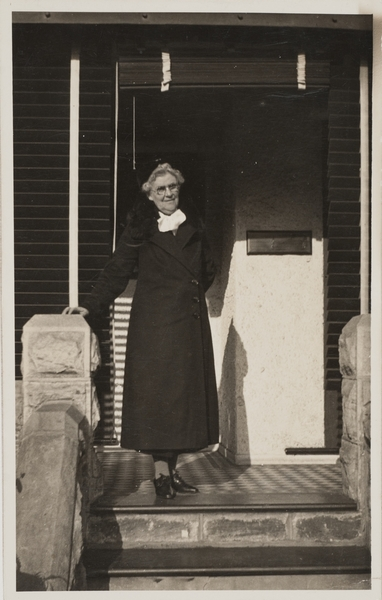
- Born: 1865; Maitland, New South Wales, Australia
- Died: 1 December 1946 (aged 79–80); Ashfield, New South Wales, Australia
- Known for: Sister of the People and evangelist
- Parent(s): Edwin Francis and Mary Ann, nee Starr

Laura Francis (1865 – 1 December 1946) was an Australian Christian missionary and itinerant evangelist, best known for her work with the Sisters of the People, serving the city poor in the slums of Sydney.

== Early life ==
Laura Francis was born in West Maitland, New South Wales, in 1865, a daughter of Edwin Francis and Mary Ann (née Starr). The family moved to Grafton in 1871. Laura converted in her early teenage years and was active in the local Methodist congregation.

In 1890 she wrote a letter to the Reverend Willian George Taylor, superintendent of the Central Methodist Mission in Sydney, about his plans to form a Sisterhood of unmarried ladies to act as pastoral assistants in helping the poor people of the city. She volunteered her services for the charitable work, on the condition that it would soon be established. Otherwise she would apply to another City Mission, The Salvation Army.

== Ministry ==
=== Sisters of the People ===
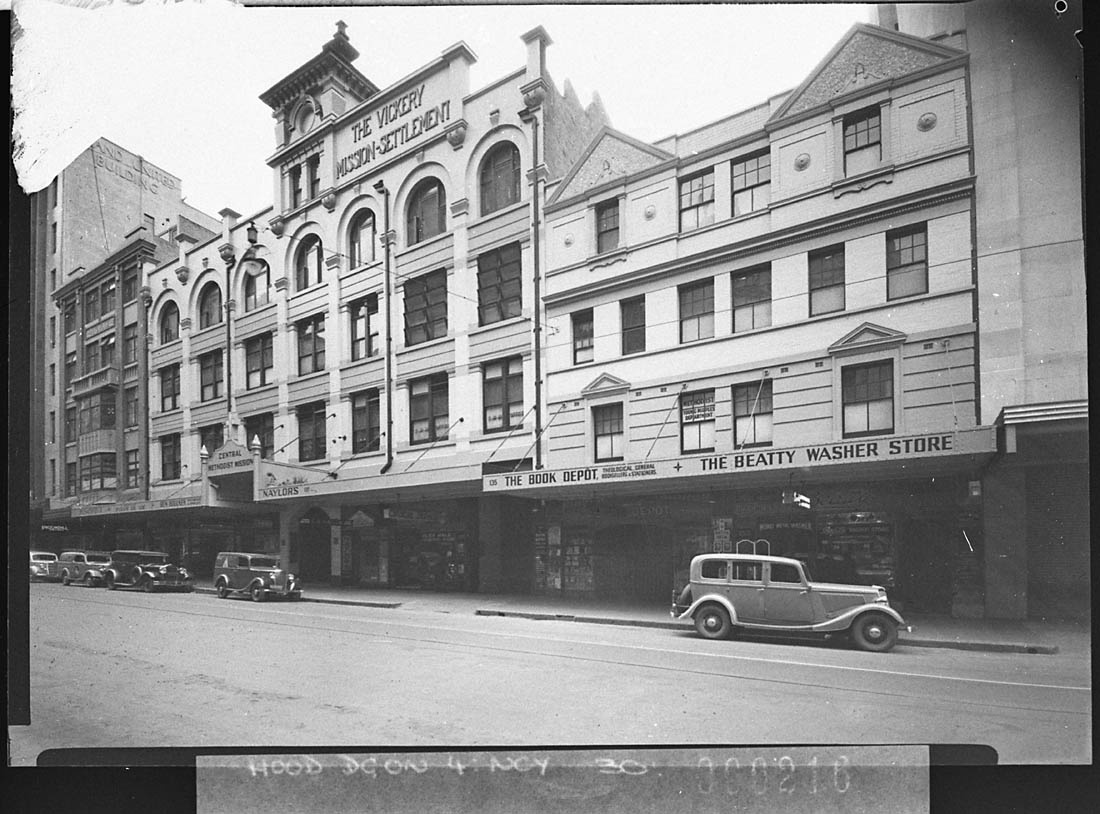
Central Methodist Mission, 139 Castlereagh Street, Sydney (1938)

Sisters of the People was founded in Sydney in 1890 by Methodist minister Reverend William George Taylor. Part of the Central Methodist Mission (now known as Wesley Mission) a home was set up at 88 Woolloomooloo Street, Woolloomooloo, and five women entered to become Sisters of the People with Laura Francis the first to sign up. The opening was announced on the front page of the Methodist Central Mission gazette on July 5, 1890.

==== Diary of Laura Francis ====
Reverend Taylor and the Mission's Committee asked the Sisters to keep a journal of their mission work, and Laura Francis began hers on the day of the opening of the Sisters' Home, August 4, 1890. Sister Francis’ diary is held in the Mitchell Library, State Library of New South Wales.

=== Children's Home ===
Laura Francis was also involved in helping establish a Children's Home at 104 Woolloomooloo Street as an arm of the Central Methodist Mission in 1893. Through her work in the slums many children were 'rescued' and placed in the home (later Dalmar). In later years she spent some time collecting for the home to help cover the cost of the new buildings at Carlingford.

=== Overseas missions ===
==== New Zealand ====
Laura Francis went to New Zealand in 1896. In Auckland that year she established a rescue home for delinquent girls “Door of Hope”. This was her main sphere of work whilst in New Zealand and she served there for five years.

==== United States of America ====
Sister Francis then toured the US for a period of four months. She visited all the Rescue homes in New York. This included a stint at the Water Street Mission under the Reverend Samuel Hadley. It is estimated she visited over seventy rescue homes and mission establishments of various denominations in the United States. On a visit to Washington she was shown through the White House.

==== United Kingdom ====
She travelled for a further two months throughout England. She conducted a number of successful missions in London. In addition to Methodist enterprises she visited non-denominational works such as Dr Barnado. She attended the Keswick Convention in Cumbria, and toured Liverpool and Wales.

The visit to Wales was prompted by news of the Welsh Revival which was being widely reported in the newspapers. Here she was actively involved at meetings associated with the Revival, an experience which left a lasting impression and prepared the way for her return to Australia as an itinerant evangelist.

=== Itinerant Evangelist ===
Laura Francis returned to Sydney in 1905 where she worked as a travelling evangelist for the Home Mission Department of the Central Methodist Mission.

From 1912 she was employed by the Methodist Church as its second evangelist (Reverend Alan Walker was the main evangelist). During this period, she conducted missions throughout NSW, many of them highly successful. Many converts entered the Methodist ministry and became front-rank lay workers for the Church. She was a distinguished evangelist at a time when such work was not usually regarded as an appropriate sphere for women.

== Later life ==
In her later years, Sister Francis devoted more of her time to hospital visitation becoming one of the first full-time visitors appointed by the Methodist Church in NSW. Most of this work was done at the Royal Prince Alfred Hospital. She was a social worker before Sydney knew those terms.

Laura Francis died on 1 December 1846 in Waddell House, Ashfield, aged 81.

== See also ==
- Methodist Church of Australasia
- Mission Australia
