= Albert Hall, Brisbane =

Demolished church hall in Brisbane, Australia

Coordinates: 27.4676°S 153.0236°E

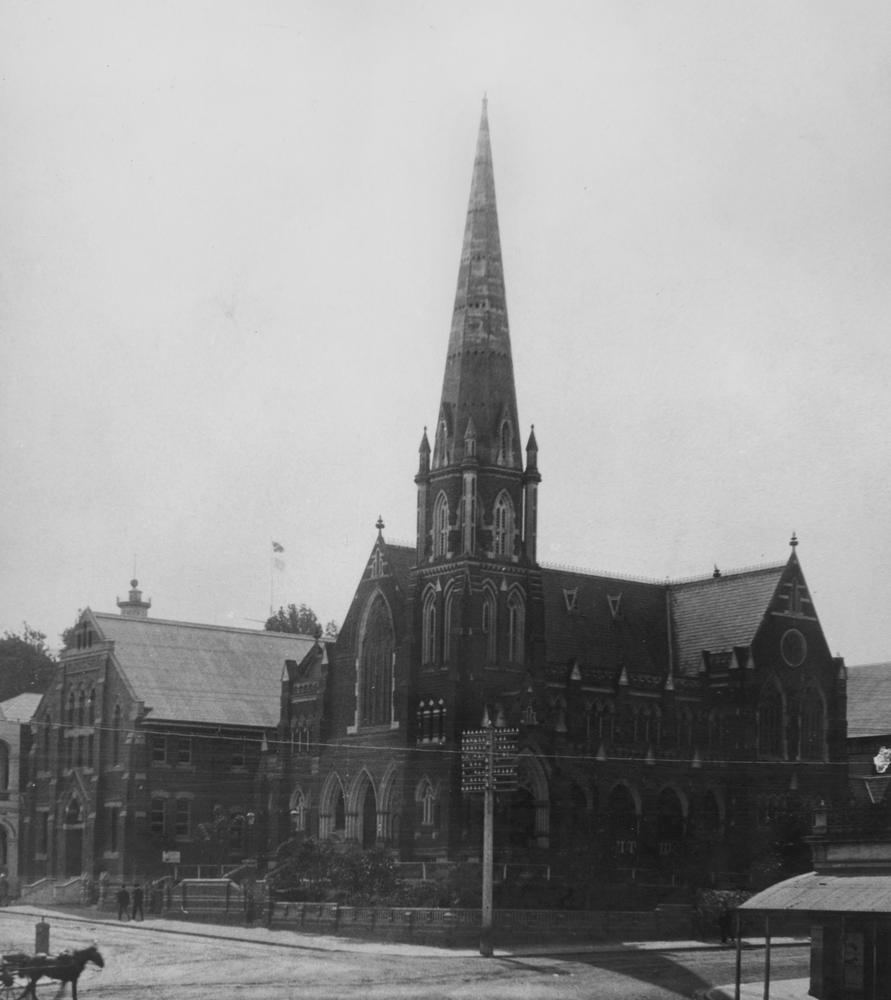
Albert Hall to the left of Albert Street Methodist Church, circa 1904

Albert Hall was a church hall and theatre from 1901 to 1969 in Brisbane, Queensland, Australia. It was on the north side of Albert Street between Ann Street and Turbot Street, to the left of Albert Street Methodist (now Uniting) Church (who owned the hall). Albert Hall was replaced by the SGIO / Suncorp Building. Although a church hall, its central city location led to a wider range of uses than a typical church hall.

== History ==
On 15 April 1901, the Attorney-General of Queensland, Arthur Rutledge, laid the foundation stone for the "new" Albert Hall. Reverend Charles Edward James placed a time capsule (a bottle containing coins, lists of church officials and recent newspapers) in a cavity before the stone was laid. On Saturday 28 September 1901, the Queensland Lieutenant-Governor, Samuel Griffith, officially opened the new hall.

From its opening in 1901 until its demolition in 1969 to make way for Brisbane’s first skyscraper (the SGIO / Suncorp Building), Albert Hall was a popular venue for Brisbane’s performing arts scene and the community in general. Many concerts, theatrical productions, film evenings, eisteddfod competitions, lectures, meetings, conferences and political rallies took place there. Albert Hall was also the venue for some of the earliest live radio broadcast performances in the 1930s, and the Australian Broadcasting Commission’s presence also extended to popular "Concerts for the armed forces" in the 1940s.

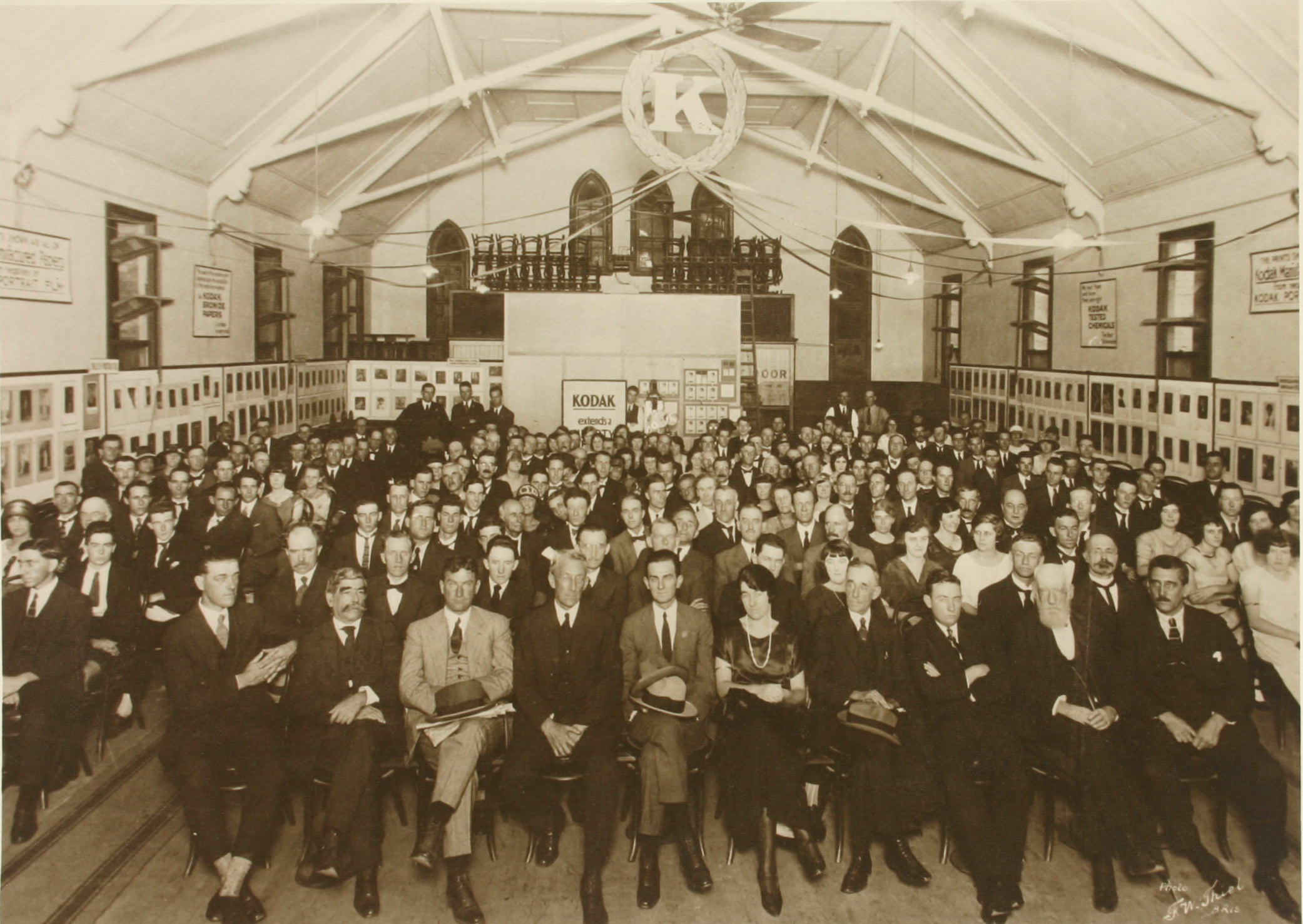
Introduction of a new movie projector, circa 1924

Visiting celebrities presented recitals in Albert Hall, as did local musicians and aspiring students as a benchmark of their professional standing. Some of the many annual teachers’ studio concerts featured special treats such as "Mrs Harry Reeves’ Banjo and Mandolin Club" in the 1920s and Bessie Dougall’s "Mastersingers Ladies’ Choir" in the 1930s. The innovative Austral Choir Recitals and those sponsored by Music Teachers’ Association of Queensland also took place there. Chamber music ensembles also found in Albert Hall an ideal venue with its good acoustics, including the Brisbane Chamber Music Society of the 1920s, the Queensland State String Quartet of the postwar years and the Musica Viva Society in the 1960s.

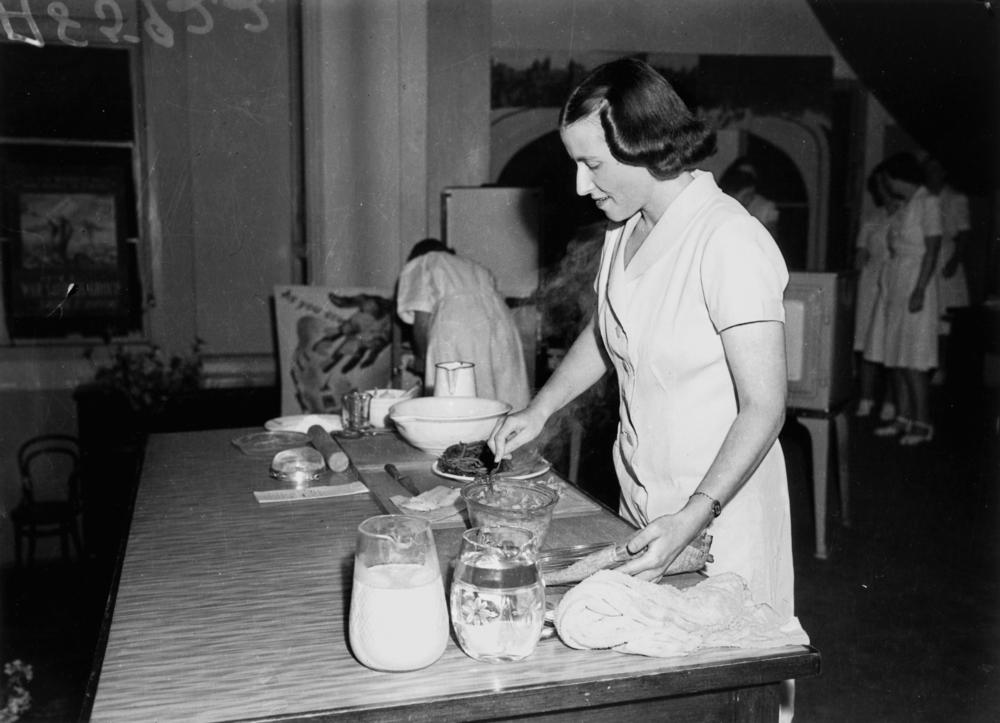
Demonstration of Austerity Cooking, Albert Hall Brisbane, 1942

In addition to many church-related events presented by Albert Street Methodist Church and other denominations, Albert Hall was the venue for performances and awards ceremonies of numerous schools, tertiary institutions and examining bodies. It was also used by local ballet studios and visiting dancers, as well as elocutionists, magicians and puppeteers. Over the years many miscellaneous events which were clearly ‘of their time’ took place as well, such as the "Gramophone concerts" of the 1920s, "Austerity cooking demonstrations" during World War II, and spelling bees and talent quests during the 1950s.

Due to its central location adjacent to King George Square (formerly Albert Square), Albert Hall was ideal for any presentation that was likely to attract a medium-sized audience, unlike the Brisbane City Hall which was better suited to larger events. Furthermore, after four decades as a basic single-level auditorium, Albert Hall was remodeled in 1941 with a proscenium stage and additional balcony seating taking the total seating to 700 people, which instantly increased its desirability for local companies. By the end of the 1940s it was the mainstage venue for all of Brisbane’s many pro-am dramatic societies, so that during the 1950s Albert Hall was in use for up to 150 days each year.

In 1969, the Queensland Government purchased the site and demolished Albert Hall to make way for its new State Government Insurance Office, a development which included the SGIO Theatre. On 28 April 1969 a gala revue was held as Albert Hall's last event.

== Legacy ==
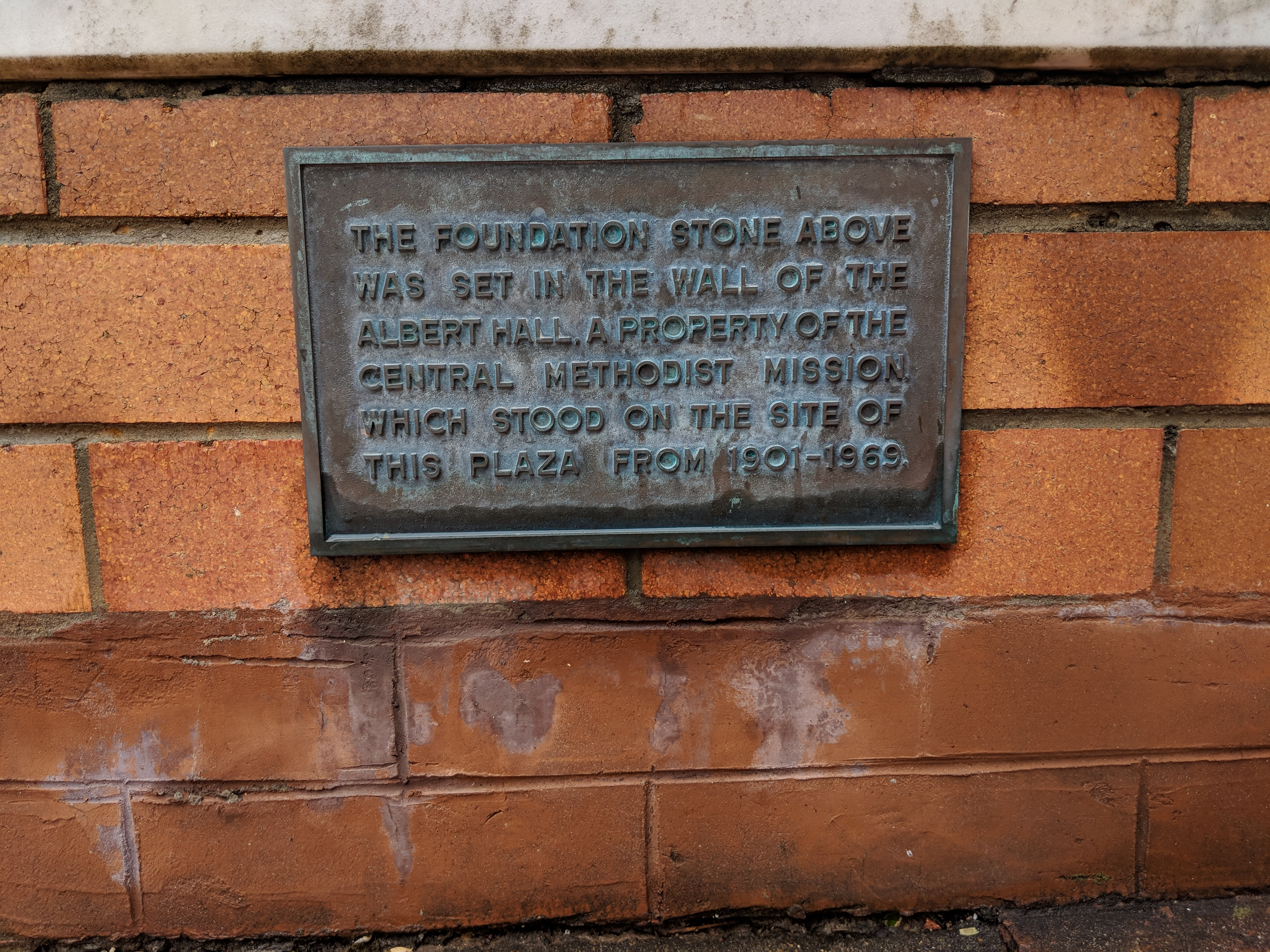
Plaque commemorating the Albert Hall, 2018

The only reference to the Albert Hall that remains is a plaque at the Albert Street Uniting Church. It reads "The foundation stone above was set in the wall of the Albert Hall, a property of the Central Methodist Mission, which stood on the site of this plaza from 1901 - 1969."
