= Wood Street Congregational Church =

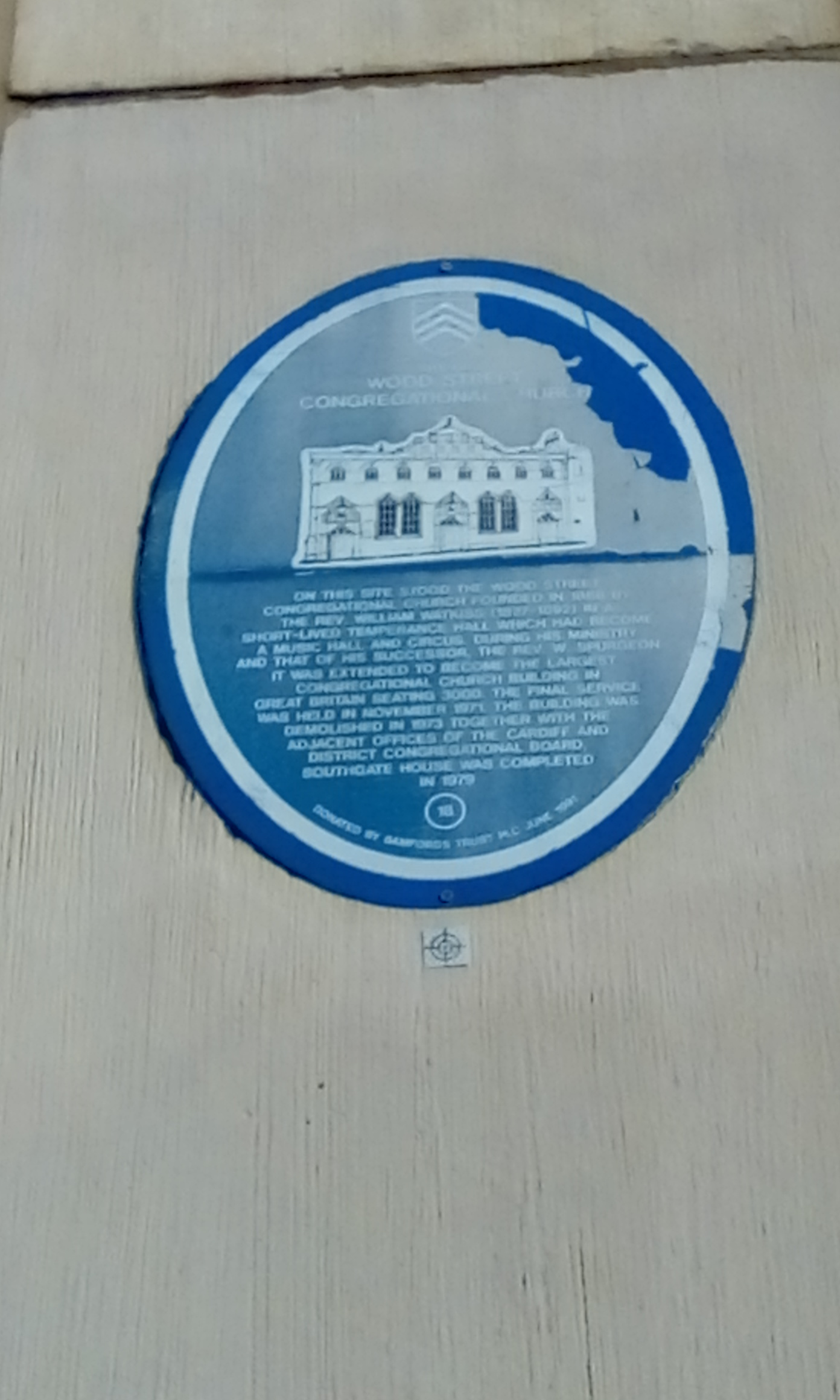
- Blue plaque at the location of the church
- Wood Street Congregational Church
- 51.4778°N 3.1790°W
- Denomination: Congregational

History
- Status: Demolished
- Founded: 1868
- Founder: William Watkiss

Architecture
- Closed: 1971
- Demolished: 1973

Specifications
- Capacity: 3000

Wood Street Congregational Church was a congregational chapel which formerly stood on Wood Street, Cardiff. It was once the largest congregational chapel in South Wales. It was demolished in the 1970s.

== Early history ==
The building which became the church was built in 1858, initially as a temperance hall. It was built as part of Temperance Town, a grid of small streets which formerly occupied much of the area to the north of Cardiff Central railway station. Within a year of opening, the building became a music hall and a circus. The acrobat Charles Blondin performed there in the early 1860s. In the later years of the decade, the building came to the attention of minister William Watkiss (1827-1892), who believed that it would be an ideal venue to fill with crowds of unchurched working people.

== Purchase and scandal ==
Watkiss was assisted in his endeavours by a Mr Ashton, a prominent member of his existing congregation. Under Ashton's expectations, the building was purchased, the local businesses lent generously to the cause, and many residents lent their savings. When the repayment was due, Ashton simply disappeared, never to be seen again. He reportedly left behind £3, a carpet bag and an old coat, and had absconded with £600 in cash (equivalent to £60,000 in 2025) and about the same amount in goods, all on credit. A play called Ashton's Little Game based on the events was written, and was staged at the Theatre Royal to packed audiences. Fortunately, the Hannah Street Congregational Church (which closed in 2002), together with emergency donations from generous individuals, saved the new church and Watkiss went on to have a successful career as minister. The first service was held on 28 September 1868.

== Subsequent history ==
After renovations and extensions in 1896, Wood Street was the largest Congregational church in South Wales, with 2000 people regularly attending its services. Although the scandal had not been fatal, the church's finances remained delicate until the late 1910s. In c. 1917, an adjoining building, the Rapers Hotel, was purchased by the Cardiff & District Congregational Board, and was used by Wood Street as a Sunday School. Lionel B. Fletcher, a well-known Australian evangelist, was minister from 1916 to 1922. The Big Tent Mission, one of the earliest Evangelist movements, pitched its camp behind the church in 1923. The two World Wars, combined with the Great Depression, caused the church to fall on leaner times. Temperance Town was demolished in the late 1930s, depriving the church of many of its attendees. The building subsequently fell into a poor condition. In 1964, three young architectural students inspected the run-down building, and discovered that it had several unusual construction quirks: doors that led nowhere, windows which were actually false, and five doors facing onto Havelock Street which had brick walls behind them.

== Demolition ==
After a final service in November 1971, the church closed after 103 years of worship. In 1973, it was demolished and replaced with an office building. It is commemorated with a blue plaque at the location.
