= Griffiths House (Alice Springs) =

Former children's home in Alice Springs, Australia

Coordinates: 23°41′58″S 133°52′51″E

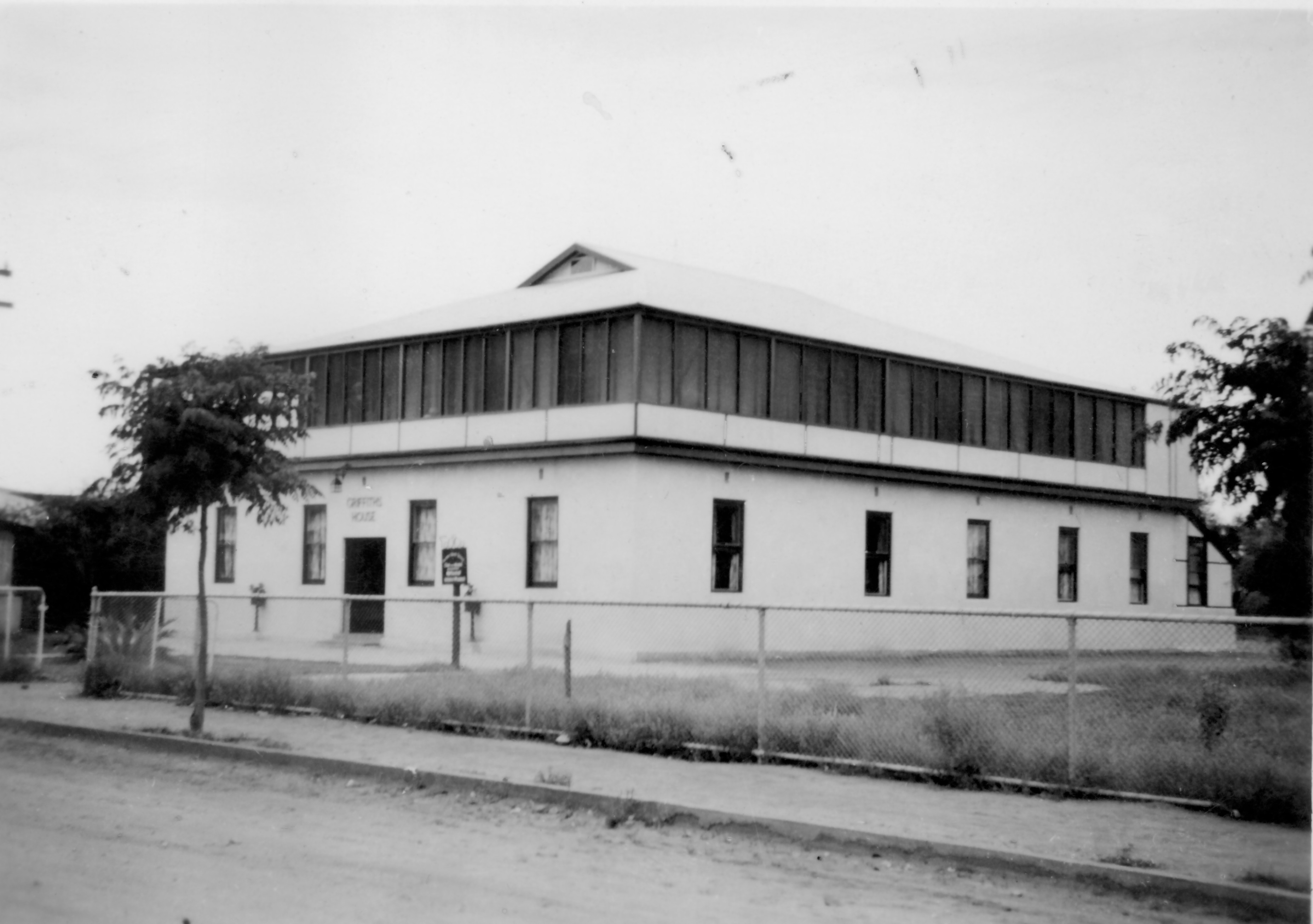
Griffiths House in the 1940s

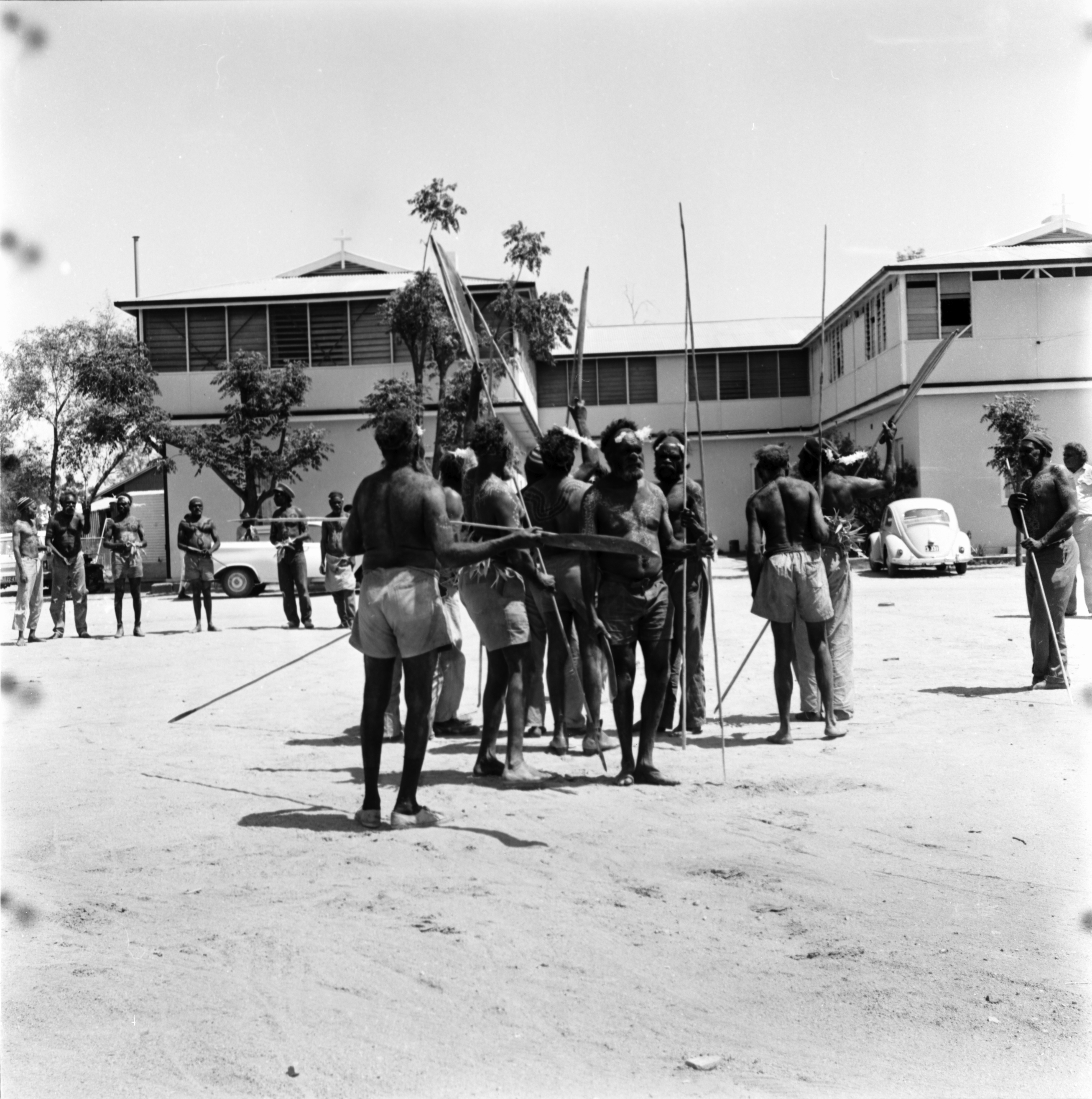
Griffiths House as pictured during a corroboree held in the 1960s.

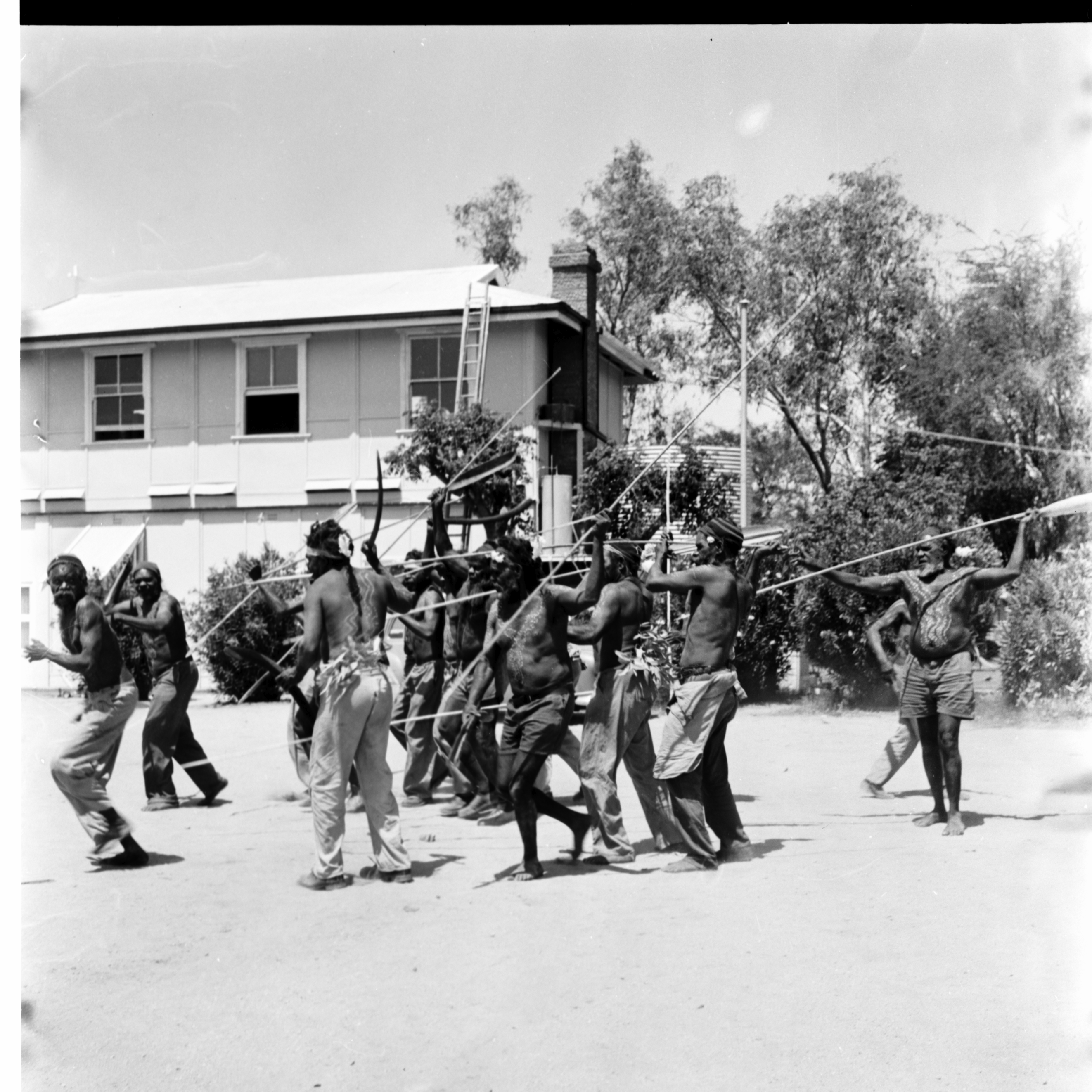
Corroboree at Griffith House in the 1960s

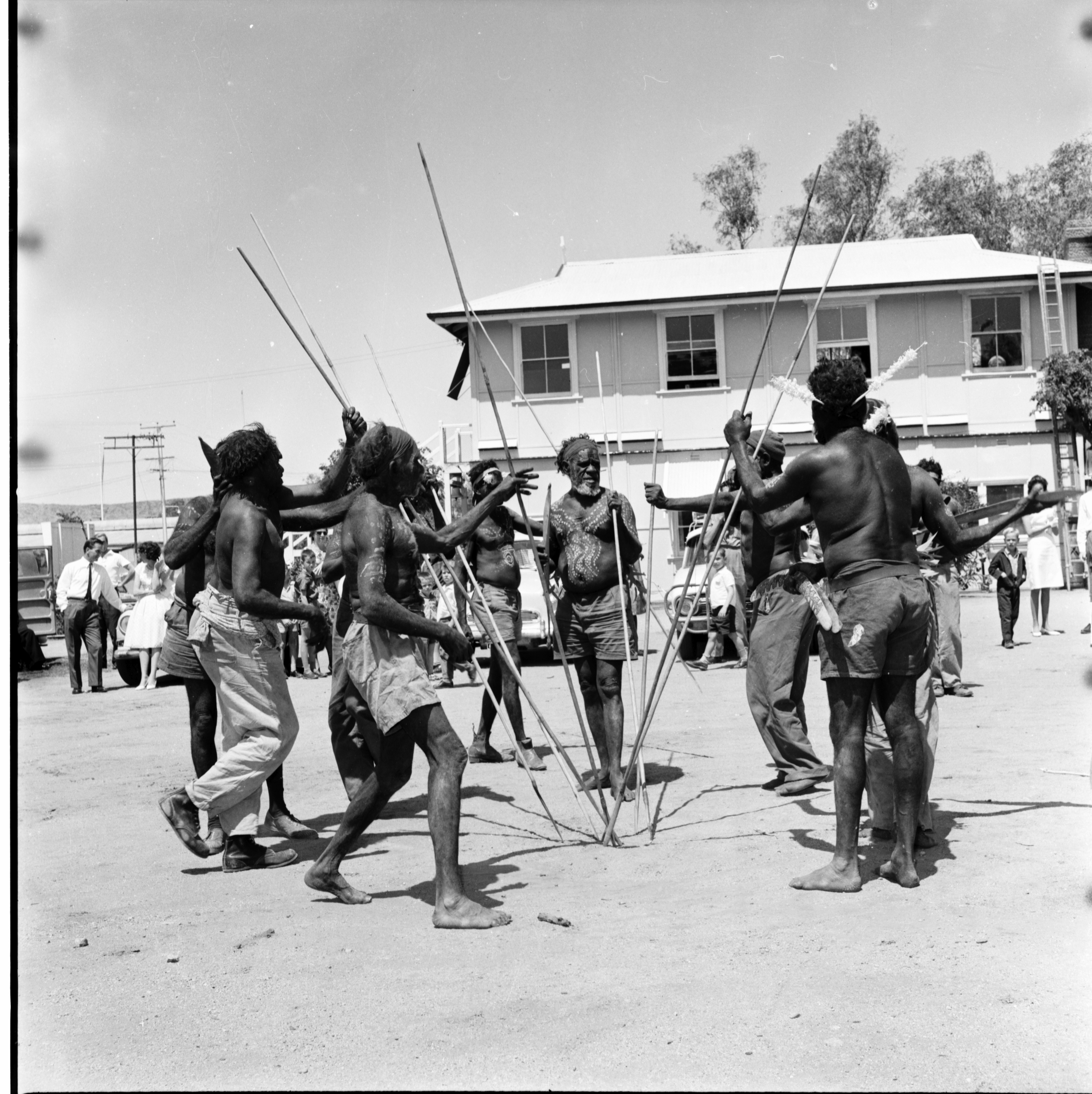
Corroboree at Griffith House in the 1960s

Griffiths House was a Methodist children's home and hostel that operated in Alice Springs, in the Northern Territory of Australia, from 1945 to 1965. It was for children from remote areas of Central Australia who were attending school in Alice Springs.

== History ==
=== Origins ===
Griffiths House was originally designed to be a hostel for young single people who had moved to Alice Springs for work, but by the time it was opened on 5 July 1941, plans had already changed, and it was immediately converted in to a social club for soldiers stationed in Alice Springs. This club, which also housed the wives of servicemen permanently stationed in the town, was known as "The Inter-Church Services Club and Hostel".

=== Use as a hostel ===
Following the end of World War II in 1945, the hostel was turned into Griffiths House, with the new purpose of housing children from more remote areas who were attending school in Alice Springs. The hostel was named Griffiths House after Reverend Harry Griffiths, and his wife Dorothy, who worked for the Methodist Inland Mission, and were instrumental in both originally building and the re-purposing of the site.

In 1945 a flood of applications were received from families around the region and the first children to move in were Earl Reidy from Henbury Station, Janice Coulson from Aileron Station and two members of the Coulthard family from Kulgera. By 1946 there were 42 children living there from as far away as Wyndham and Darwin, and Griffiths House struggled to meet demand. The children living at the hostel attended Hartley Street School or the Our Lady of the Sacred Heart Convent School.

In 1958 a new accommodation block, for senior boys, was built on the site alongside a new kitchen/laundry. This meant that, in 1959, Griffiths House could host 55 children.

=== Decline and closure (1965) ===
From 1961 until 1964 demand for accommodation decreased, partially due to severe drought and, by 1964, numbers were down to 33 (21 boys and 12 girls, seven of whom were Aboriginal) and this led to its closure in 1965. Over 700 children passed through Griffiths House during its 20 years as a children's home.

In the 1950s, Fred McKay, superintendent of the Australian Inland Mission, had lobbied the United Church in the Northern Territory to provide more accommodation, and the then Presbyterian, Methodist, and Congregational churches set about creating a new, larger, residential hostel, which opened on 4 April 1965 as St Philip's College. Griffiths House was then re-dedicated as a youth and fellowship centre, and it was also used as a Sunday school, meeting venue, and accommodation for St Philips College staff. In 1989 St Philip's became a full boarding school.

=== Later uses and demolition (1982) ===
From the 1970s, with further expansions, it became low-cost rental accommodation and crisis accommodation, and a "bush" family could stay at the hostel for $30 a week rather than pay $20 a night for a hotel. It is estimated that, between 1968 and 1969, 6,000 people used the accommodation. There were often conflicts between residents and the police had to be called on a regular basis and because of these challenges, and with the additional stresses of the constant challenge of maintenance, rising building costs, and other accommodation becoming available, the decision was made to sell and demolish the complex in 1982. The site was then developed by the Aboriginal Development Corporation and would become a part of the site for the Yeperenye Shopping Centre.

== Alternative names ==
- Alice Springs Children's Hostel
- Methodist Children's Hostel
