= Charles Stead =

Rev. Charles Stead (24 January 1839 – 29 May 1916) was an Australian Wesleyan Methodist minister, working in New South Wales and Queensland. He was instrumental in the union of the two branches of the church in Australia.

== History ==
Stead was born at Westgate Hill, Bradford, Yorkshire, and trained for the Wesleyan Methodist ministry. In 1863 he was one of five young preachers sent as missionaries to New South Wales, with Richard Sellors, F. T. Brentnall, W. E. Bourne, and J. N. Manning, the first of whom remained a lifelong friend. Their ship Damascus left London in September 1863 and arrived in Sydney in January 1864.

In 1864 he was appointed to the Bathurst circuit and served for the usual three years at each of Forbes, Adelong, Gunning, Wagga Wagga, St Leonards, Orange, Newtown, Bathurst. In 1895 he took charge of the Methodist circuit of Gympie in Queensland, In 1897 he succeeded W. Jeffries as president of the Queensland Wesleyan Methodist Conference. His presidency was notable for meetings with William Powell, president of the Primitive Methodist Conference, working towards a union of the two branches of Methodism.

In 1900 he returned to Sydney on account of his wife's failing health. As there was no suitable charge available, he was given the Mount Lachlan church on Raglan Street, Waterloo.

In 1903 he had the task of liquidating the Primitive Methodist Church property at North Botany, then was transferred to Homebush and in 1906 to Kiama, from which circuit he retired in 1909.

His appointments include:

- Assistant Secretary of Conference from 1879–1887, then Secretary 1888–1892.
- 1892: President of the New South Wales and Queensland Conference and honorary president, Newington College
- 1896–1900: Conference Treasurer and Secretary for Foreign Missions in Queensland
- 1898: President of the Council of Churches in Queensland
- 1911: Conference Treasurer and Secretary for Foreign Missions in New South Wales

For 11 years he was Chairman of Districts

His critics included Rev. William Clarke, who was president to Stead's secretary in 1890. They had diverging views on union of the two major forms of Methodism, Primitive and Wesleyan, for which Stead was a strong advocate.

His last service was in the Homebush Church on 14 May 1916, two weeks before his death.

He died at his home, "Mansfield", Croydon Avenue, Croydon, New South Wales, aged 77. He bequeathed £1,681 9s 6d, to Leigh College for a Charles Stead Theological Students' Assistance Fund, and a similar sum to the Queensland Methodist seminary.

== Family ==
Stead married M. Rhodes, previously of Gomersal, Leeds, on 31 October 1867. She died from breast cancer on 14 April 1892, after several operations at Bathurst by doctors Spencer and Machattie.

He married again, on 13 October 1893, to Mary Dawson ( – 29 July 1900)

He married again, on 20 Sep 1901, to Harriet Elizabeth Saxby, at "Highmoor", Victoria St., Lewisham, New South Wales. She died at Croydon on 2 July 1929. She was known as a worker for the church at Malvern Hill.

No evidence has been found of offspring from any of these unions.
