= Lionel B. Fletcher =

Australian Congregational minister and evangelist

Rev. Lionel B. Fletcher
- Born: 22 May 1877; Maitland, Australia
- Died: 19 February 1954 (aged 76); Mosman, Australia
- Occupations: Congregational minister; evangelist; temperance advocate; author
- Spouse: Maude Harris Basham

Lionel Bale Fletcher (22 May 1877 – 19 February 1954) was an Australian Congregational minister and evangelist who held pastorates in Australia, Wales, and New Zealand. Fletcher led successful evangelistic campaigns across Australia, the British Isles, and South Africa. He also wrote multiple books including an autobiography, Mighty Moments (1931).

== Biography ==
Fletcher was born in Maitland, New South Wales, eighth and final child to John and Eliza (née Bale) Fletcher. His father was a Methodist lay preacher. All seven of his sons, including Michael Scott Fletcher, became preachers and at least three were ordained as Methodist ministers. Fletcher attended Newington College (1890–1892) before doing an apprenticeship on the vessel 'Maquarie'. He was converted in July 1896 after an evangelistic confrontation with his brother, Henry. "I went to bed in a violent rage," said Fletcher, "but I had gone far enough, and the mighty hand of God gripped my life that night." On 24 January 1900, Fletcher married Maude Harris Basham and together they had several children.

=== Pastoral ministry ===
Fletcher pastored in three churches over the course of his life. First, from 1909 to 1915, he pastored in Port Adelaide where his predecessor was Rev. Joseph Coles Kirby. Second, at Wood Street Congregational Church in Cardiff, Wales from 1916 to 1922. His third pastorate was at the Beresford Street church in Auckland, New Zealand from 1923 to 1932.

=== Evangelistic work ===
Fletcher's most notable work was in evangelism which was his real passion. Indeed, Edwin Orr calls Fletcher "The outstanding evangelist of the between-Wars period."

Within days of Fletcher's conversion his father's journal tells of his son wanting to start "a Christian Endeavour or a young people's class." Fletcher led the 'New Life Campaign' in Britain in 1922-1923 and went on in 1931 to lead a six-month evangelistic youth campaign in England. From September 1932 he served as 'Empire Evangelist' for the 'Movement for World Evangelization' in London until 1935. He also led highly successful campaigns in South Africa in 1934 and 1936 and again in 1938. Charles Malcolm, Fletcher's biographer, estimates that over 250,000 professed conversion under Fletcher's ministry.

F. W. Boreham, in his foreword to Charles Malcolm's biography of Fletcher, emphasised Fletcher's love for Australia: "He evangelised many lands, but he yearned above all things for the salvation of Australia."

=== Honours ===
Fletcher turned down an honorary doctorate on several occasions, but on 9 November 1951 finally accepted an honorary Doctorate of Divinity from Biola University, whose president Dr. Louis T. Talbot (after whom Talbot Theological Seminary was named) was converted partly as a result of Fletcher's ministry in Sydney years earlier. Talbot had hoped to confer the degree personally in Australia, but being unable to, asked the Anglican Archbishop of Sydney and Primate of Australia, Howard Mowll to confer the degree in his stead.

== Bibliography ==
=== Books ===
- Effective Evangelism (1923)
- Mighty Moments (1931)
- The Golden Highway (1932)
- Life Quest and Conquest (1933)
- Faith: The Golden Link (1933)
- Hope: The Golden Light (1934)
- Love: The Golden Law (1934)
- Skipper My Chum—and other True Dog Stories (1935)
- Prayer: The Secret Power (1937)
- South African Jewels (1937)
- After Conversion - What? (1939)
- Kneeling to Conquer (1939)
- Conquering Evangelism (1946)

=== Booklets/articles ===
- Temptation and how to conquer it (1934)
- Youth and Evangelism (1936)
- Shall Revival Come Again? (1938)
- Step by Step in the Christian Life (1930s)

=== Compilations ===
- Refining Fires (1932)
- Millstones and Milestones (1933)
- Pathway to the Stars (1933)
- Golden Blooms (1935)
