= Frederick Thomas Brentnall =

Australian businessman and politician

The Hon Frederick Brentnall

Member of the Queensland Legislative Council
- In office 17 April 1886 – 23 March 1922

Personal details
- Born: Frederick Thomas Brentnall; 17 June 1834 Riddings, Derbyshire, England
- Died: 11 January 1925 (aged 90) Brisbane, Queensland, Australia
- Resting place: Balmoral Cemetery
- Spouse: Elizabeth Watson (m.1867 d.1909)
- Occupation: Company chairman

Hon. Frederick Thomas Brentnall (17 June 1834 – 11 January 1925) was a Wesleyan preacher in New South Wales and a journalist, businessman and politician in Queensland, Australia. He was a Member of the Queensland Legislative Council.

== Early life ==
Brentnall was born at Riddings, Derbyshire and educated at Alfreton.

== Religious life ==
Brentnall was sent by the British Wesleyan Conference to New South Wales in 1863, along with Charles Stead, Richard Sellors, W. E. Bourne, and Manning, to join the ranks of the Wesleyan Methodist ministry in the colony. An affection of the throat, however, necessitated his resignation about 1883.

== Business life ==
Brentnall then bought an interest in the Brisbane Telegraph, and joined the literary staff, becoming Chairman of the Company upon the retirement of the Hon. James Cowlishaw in Oct. 1885. Brentnall was a director of several companies, including the Queensland Deposit Bank and Building Society, and the Queensland General Insurance Company, Ltd.

== Politics ==
Brentnall was appointed a Member of the Queensland Legislative Council on 17 April 1886. Although a lifetime appointment, he held it until the abolition of the council on 23 March 1922.

Brentnall was also a member of the Coorparoo Shire Council and served as its chairman in 1888 and 1889.

== Later life ==
Brentnall died in Brisbane in 1925 and was buried in Balmoral Cemetery. He was survived by two daughters: Flora (Mrs E. B. Harris) and Charlotte Amelia Brentnall. His daughter, Flora Harris would help convene the Women's War Memorial Committee in Brisbane, which was instrumental in fundraising to establish a fountain in Anzac Square, following WWI. This fountain which sits alongside the carved panel carved by Daphne Mayo, honoured the men who fell during WWI.
