= Elizabeth Brentnall =

Australian suffragist and philanthropist (1830–1909)

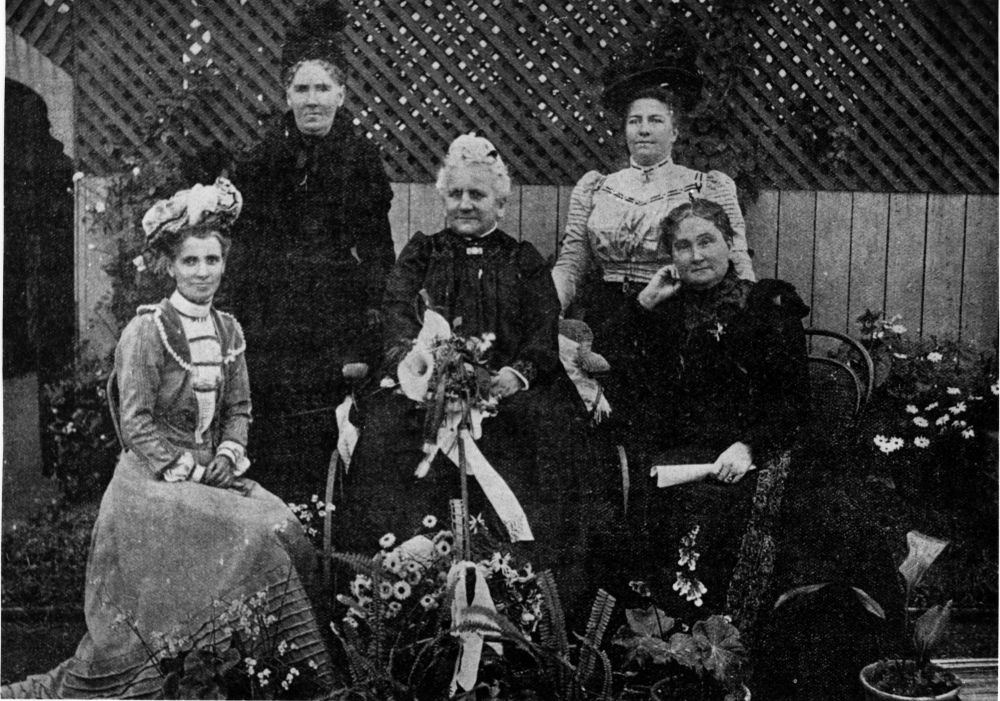
- Front Row: Mrs Carvosso (President), Mrs Brentnall (Treasurer), Mrs Murray (Honourable Secretary). Back Row: Mrs T. Bryce (Hon. Treasurer), Mrs E. B. Harris (Vice-President-at-Large)
- Born: Elizabeth Watson; 18 September 1830; Nottingham, England
- Died: 30 April 1909 (aged 78); Brisbane, Australia
- Education: Teacher training
- Occupations: Philanthropist, suffragist, temperance activist
- Organization: Woman's Christian Temperance Union
- Known for: Leadership of Queensland WCTU, suffrage activism and charitable works
- Board member of: Wesleyan Home Mission Society Ladies Auxiliary, Queensland Woman's Christian Temperance Union, Lady Bowen Hospital, Lady Musgrave Lodge, Governesses' Home, Industrial Home, Sailors’ Mission
- Spouse: Frederick Thomas Brentnall
- Children: Flora Harris, Charlotte Amelia Brentnall

Elizabeth Brentnall (née Watson; 18 September 1830, Nottingham, England – 30 April 1909, Brisbane, Australia) was an Australian suffragist, temperance activist and philanthropist. She was the first state president (1885–99) then honorary president of the Woman's Christian Temperance Union (WCTU) in Queensland.

She was a Methodist Christian and in her 1888 presidential address to the WCTU annual convention she called for women's voting rights and pushed for adoption of women's suffrage as a mission activity of the Queensland WCTU.

== Life and work ==
Elizabeth Watson (later Brentnall) was born in 1830 in Nottingham, England; her father was John Watson, a store-keeper and Wesleyan Methodist lay preacher in Mansfield, Nottingham and her mother was Ann Coupe. She trained as a teacher at the Normal College in Glasgow, Scotland. The normal teacher training college was set up by the Glasgow Educational Society to professionally train teachers and improve education for working people in Scotland, especially in urban and industrial areas. "Normal" referred to the norm or pattern of teaching. The Wesleyan Conference in England sent trainee teachers there although in this case it seems Elizabeth's parents sent her there in 1850. She graduated in 1852 and first taught at Wesleyan infants’ school at Mansfield Woodgate then was head of the girls’ and infants’ sections of the Bacup, Lancashire Wesleyan school and finally in 1864 headmistress of the Wesleyan infants’ school in Oldbury.

She left her position as headmistress and migrated to Sydney in 1866 to marry Wesleyan minister Frederick Thomas Brentnall on 14 November 1867. Frederick later became a journalist, company director and member of the Queensland Legislative Council. The Brentnalls served Wesleyan Methodist congregations for seven years in Sydney, Mudgee and Windsor, New South Wales, before settling in Queensland in 1873. The Brentnalls had two daughters, Flora (b. 1868, later known as Mrs Edgar Bridal Harris) and Charlotte Amelia (b. 1870).

=== Suffrage and philanthropy ===
Historically, some early Wesleyan Methodist churches licensed women to preach and lead scripture classes, and encouraged members' involvement in social welfare reform, the women's suffrage movement and education for the working class. Brentnall's membership of the Wesleyan Methodist church indicates that her faith motivated her leadership in the suffrage and temperance movements and in social reform.

As a minister's wife, Brentnall was vice-president then president of the Wesleyan Home Mission Society Ladies Auxiliary in Queensland and continued in that role even after Frederick resigned from his ministry in 1881.

In 1885, Elizabeth Brentnall became the first state president of the Queensland Woman's Christian Temperance Union. There had previously been local chapters in Queensland. As a president of the WCTU she pushed for adoption of women's suffrage as mission activity in 1888. A mission activity meant the union should pursue social action to achieve a goal, in this case women's right to vote. The WCTU established a womanhood suffrage department in 1891 superintended by Charlotte Eleanor Trundle from 1893 who worked with the Women's Equal Franchise Association (WEFA) to submit suffrage petitions to the Queensland parliament; a double petition from WEFA in 1894 (one signed by women and one by men) and one from the WCTU signed by women and men in 1897. Most of Brentnall's WCTU activities aimed to benefit women and children, reform legislation and mitigate the effects of alcohol on families and society. WCTU meetings opened with "devotions" and included prayers and hymns. Brentnall often led devotions or prayers for both national conventions and the Queensland union. In 1897 she led a deputation to the acting premier, Horace Tozer, to argue for repeal of the Contagious Diseases Act 1868 which allowed police to arrest a woman (but not a man) on the street, have her inspected for venereal disease and locked up in a hospital if she was infected.

Brentnall remained in the position of the president of the WCTU until 1899 when she retired due to an injury to her knee cap. Afterwards she was an honorary life president of the WCTU. She also founded the Young Woman's Christian Temperance Union in Australia.

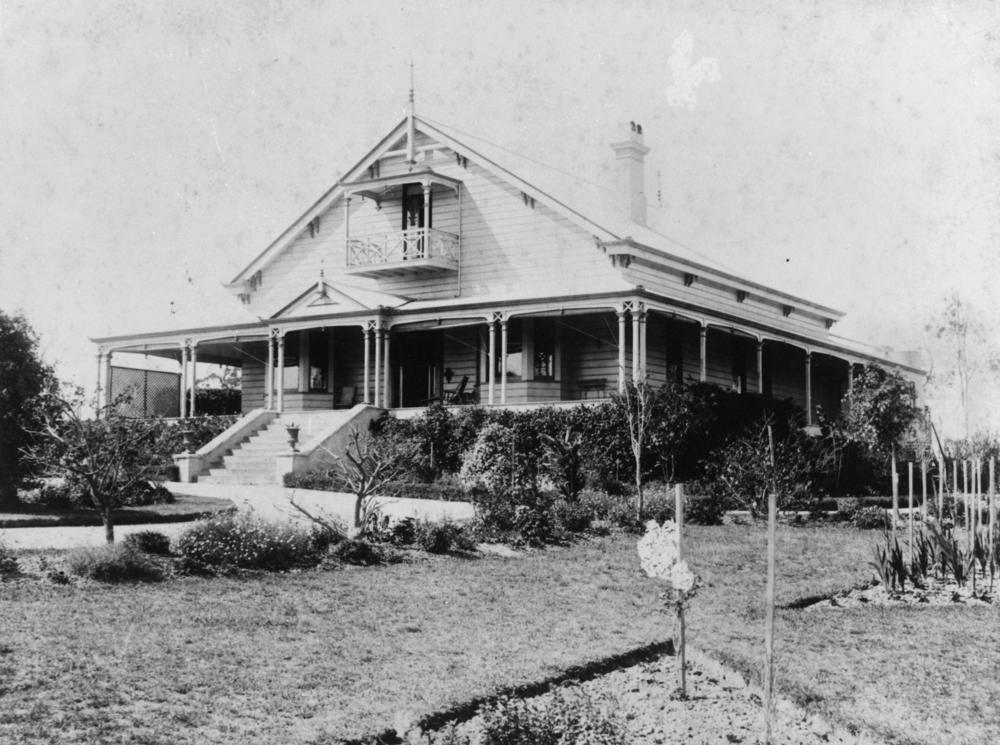
Eastleigh in the suburb of Coorparoo, Brisbane, home of the Brentnall family. This gracious home was set in manicured gardens and the entrance flanked by wide verandahs and a flight of stone steps.

Frederick Brentnall opposed votes for women even as member of the legislative council and wanted male franchise retained only for property owners. On the other hand, he co-hosted an 'at home' function for WCTU members at their estate, Eastleigh, in Coorparoo in 1901, spoke at some WCTU meetings, including making a supportive speech at the first Brisbane meeting and participated with Elizabeth in some welfare work such as flood relief assistance in both the 1890 and 1893 Brisbane floods.

Elizabeth sat on committees for charitable organisations in Queensland. Committee work involved more than meetings; the members of the "ladies committees" founded the institution in response to demand, assessed applicants for admission, visited residents, organised fund-raising events, helped in training, counselling and job placement. Brentnall was active on the committees of at least five institutions: Lady Bowen Hospital (a "lying-in" hospital for mothers) 1882–1886, Lady Musgrave Lodge (a home for immigrant and young working women) 1885–1897, the Governesses' Home (a home and employment agency for governesses and lady workers) from 1883 and the Industrial Home (a home and employment for "fallen" or friendless women) from 1883. Brentnall's charitable work was mostly with women and children but in October 1894, she helped opened the Sailors’ Mission, a recreation hall for sailors and was president of the mission during the 1890s.

=== Death and legacy ===
Brentnall died in 1909 of acute peritonitis at her home in Coorparoo, Brisbane, Australia, seven years after white women were allowed the federal vote in 1902 and four years after white women could vote in Queensland state elections.

She was known as a prolific letter-writer to obtain support for her social reform work but also to encourage and counsel individuals. A speaker at her memorial service said, "Her fertile pen contributed articles and addresses private and public, letters stimulating, heartening those who were fighting the good fight, and securing help for the weak, sorrowful, and ignorant."

Her obituary included this description:

"Her life was one of true service...Although the body had to rest, it was not so with her mind, tongue and pen--these were used in the service of others, and first in the world wide temperance cause, which lay so near to her heart. She was the first president of the Woman's Christian Temperance Union. Many could recall the tone of spirituality that pervaded the society at the outset, imparted to it by the lofty ideal that was in the mind of their late sister...Being a woman of large heart she had cultivated a world-wide sympathy, was thoroughly cosmopolitan in her outlook upon life, and her influence would live on."

Until at least 1929, the Queensland WCTU held "red letter days" when members honoured and remembered the work of Elizabeth Brentnall. One of Brentnall's legacies was to raise her daughters in the WCTU as temperance advocates and suffragists. Both of her daughters sometimes spoke at the meetings. Flora especially carried on her mother's work in the WCTU although Charlotte also stayed involved. Flora, first as Miss Brentnall then as Mrs EB Harris, was appointed organiser in 1890 of the Young Woman's Christian Temperance Union (known as the "Y') and president of the Queensland WCTU in 1902.
