= ANZAC Hill =

Mountain in Australia

Coordinates: 23°41′41″S 133°52′56″E

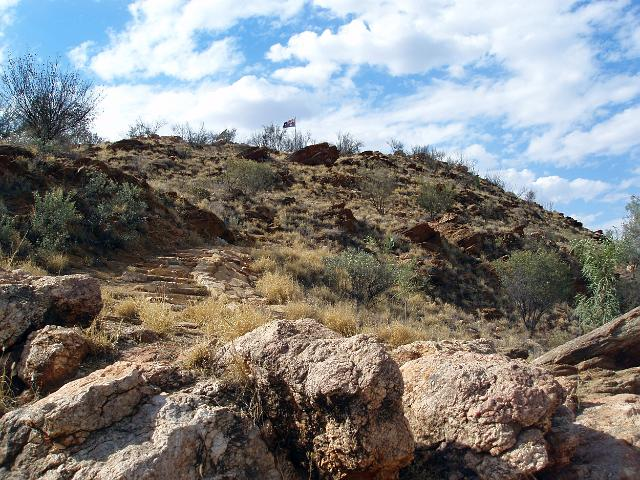
Anzac hill stairs

ANZAC Hill, at 608 meters (1995 feet), is located in Alice Springs (Mparntwe), in the Northern Territory of Australia and it is on the lands of the Arrernte people.

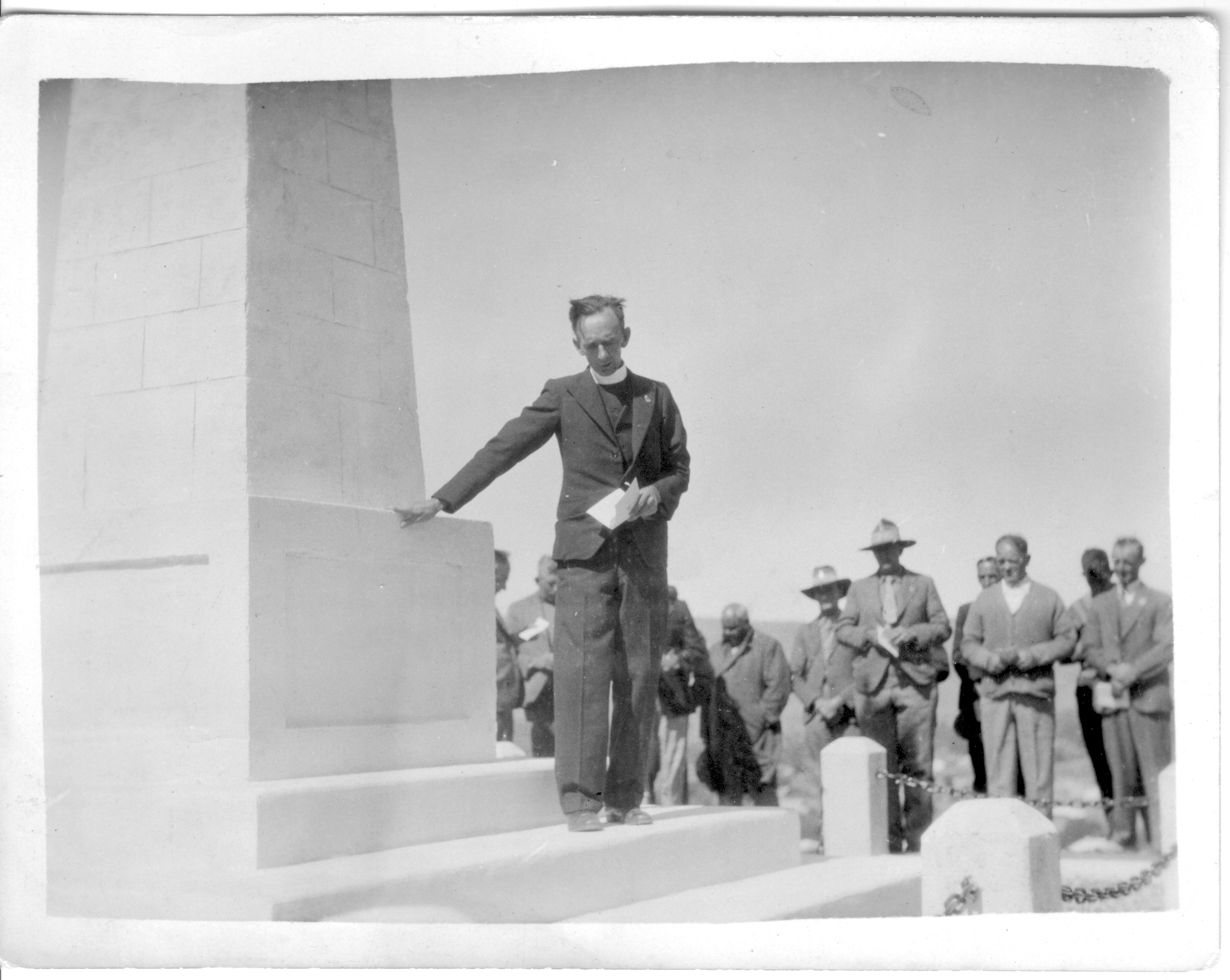
The dedication of the memorial by Rev Harry Griffiths in 1934

The Arrernte name of ANZAC Hill have been recorded as both Untyeyetwelye and Atnelkentyarliweke.

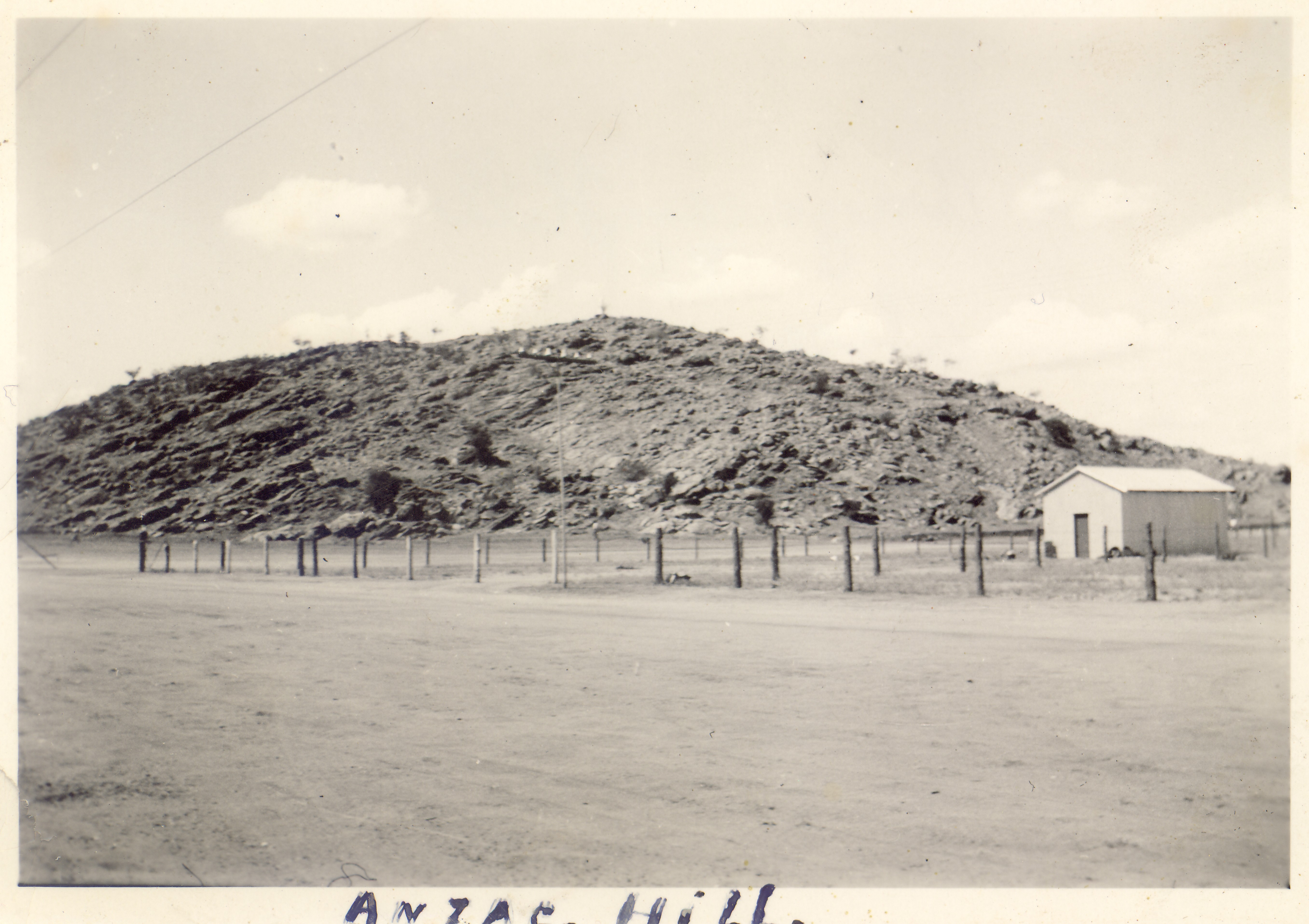
ANZAC Hill, Alice Springs, c1939

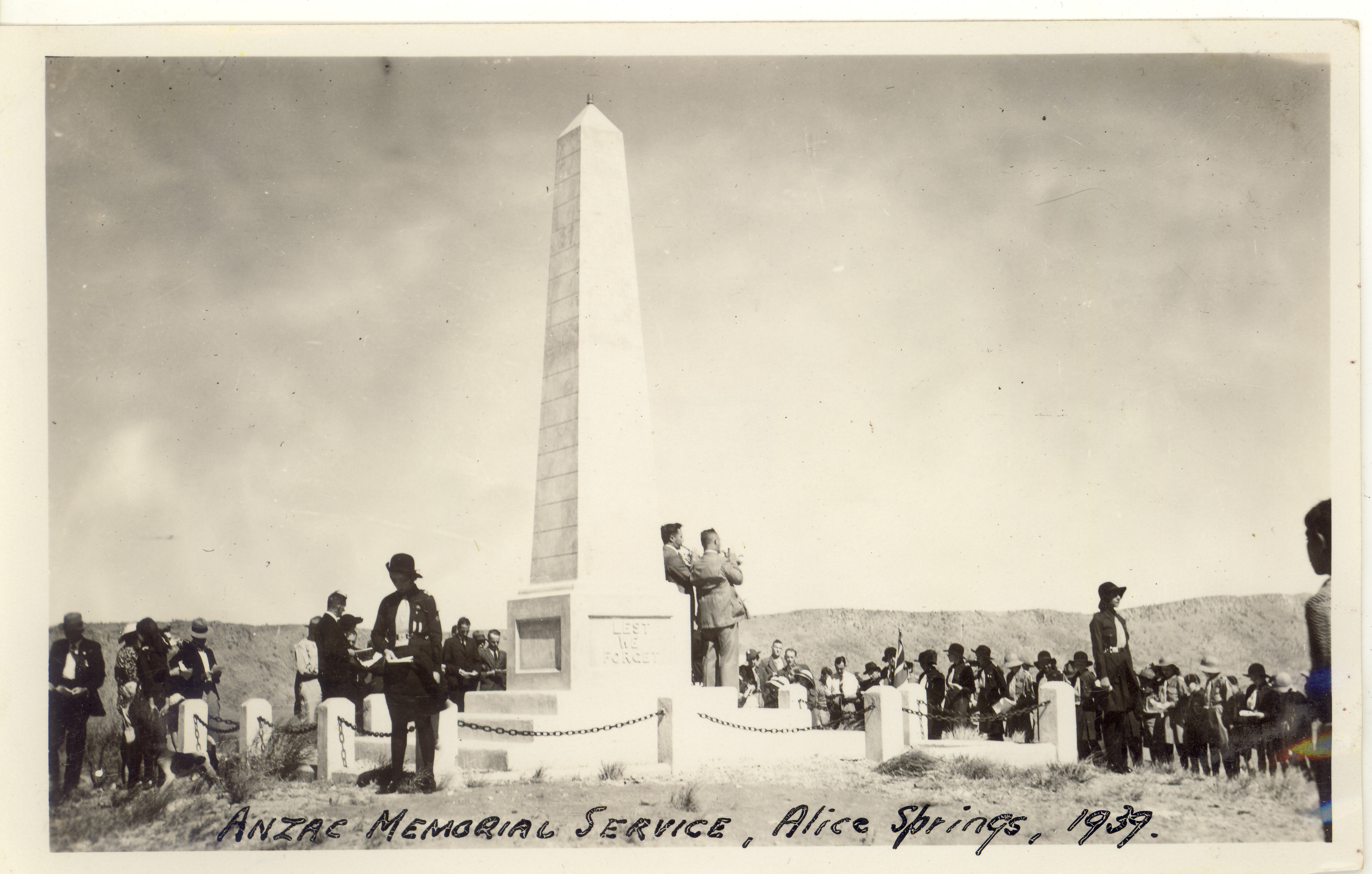
ANZAC Memorial Service, Alice Springs, 1939

The European name for the hill comes from the ANZAC memorial which has been located at the top of it since 1933. Walking up ANZAC Hill is a popular activity for tourists and locals in the town as it offer panoramic views of the town.

== History ==
The Rev Harry Griffiths designed the ANZAC Memorial in 1933 and it was unveiled on Anzac Day 1934. The Rev Griffiths dedicated the memorial on that day to those who died in World War I; since then it has become a memorial to all those who have served in all wars in which Australia has participated. Later, on 2 June 1987 Griffiths' and his wife ashes were placed there.

During World War II the land surrounding ANZAC Hill was used by the military and large camps were established at its base. This base was primarily in us by the Darwin Overland Maintenance Force who were upgrading the Stuart Highway.
