= Harold M. Wheller =

Harold Manuel Wheller OBE (26 January 1882 – 17 November 1979) was a Methodist minister in Queensland, remembered as Superintendent of Brisbane's Central Methodist Mission and minister of the Albert Street Methodist Church.

== History ==
Wheller was born in Tarlee, South Australia, a son of Mary Jane, née Gullidge (died 1939) and James Manuel Wheller (died 1906), a blacksmith. He was educated at Stanley Grammar School, Watervale, and worked for a while in Norwood, Adelaide.

In 1904 he preached at Kangaroo Point, Queensland and applied as a candidate for the ministry. In 1905 he was sent by the Methodist synod in Brisbane to Queen's College, University of Melbourne. At the 1906 synod meeting his probation was advanced one step, and in 1907 was appointed assistant pastor of the Paddington Methodist Church. He mostly served in the Kennedy Terrace Church, in the Ithaca circuit.

In 1909 he was posted to the Cairns Church, and was given a rousing farewell two years later.

His next posting was to the North Ipswich church, where despite his health being affected by the hot weather, he had a successful ministry. His next post was to Stanthorpe, who played host to the Downs Synod in 1915.

In 1917 he was next sent by the Stationing Committee to Wooloowin, and in 1921 to the Ellenborough Street church, Ipswich. Sometime around 1925 he was called to the Albert Street, Brisbane, church, where he remained.

At the 18th general conference in May 1941 Wheller was appointed President-General of the Methodist Conference, which covers the whole of Australasia. William Henry Jones, as secretary-general, would have progressed to president-general, but died in July 1939. J. W. Burton was confirmed as secretary-general.

In 1936 the experimental Garden Settlement, Queensland's first aged care community, largely sponsored by George Marchant at Chermside was opened. It provided board and lodging for around 70 old people, charging 14/6d ($1.45 before inflation) per head per week.

=== Brisbane Council of Churches ===
Wheller acted president in 1935 during the absence of Norman Millar. Millar and Wheller were accused of contempt of court when they wrote a letter to the Courier-mail, criticising a judge of the Supreme Court for a joke he made against the institution of marriage. Both men, and the publisher of the Courier-mail, were dealt hefty fines by Justice Macrossan, but reversed on appeal to the Full Bench. Both were vigorous critics of all forms of gambling but reserved their harshest condemnation for the government-run Golden Casket, a lottery with prize of £25,000. He led protests against the introduction of Bingo. He was still president in 1943.

== Publication ==
Wheller, H. M (1933) Our Quest for God (collected sermons).

== Recognition ==
In 1953 Wheller was invested with the Order (OBE).

The Garden Settlement, Chermside, was renamed Wheller Gardens.

== Family ==
Wheller married Edith Mary Stack on 10 May 1910.

- John Manuel Wheller (23 March 1913 – 11 July 1976) married Ruby.
- Dorothy Wheller
- (Howard) Douglas Wheller (13 November 1922 – 29 March 1944) was killed in an aviation accident A window, by A. C. Handel, of the Albert Street church was dedicated to him and another RAAF officer.

John trained as a broadcast radio technician with PMG's Dept. In May 1941 he was Pilot Officer with RAAF, gained a local reputation as an inventor. Dorothy taught elocution at Ipswich Girls' Grammar School and Douglas was trainee draftsman with Brisbane Council's electricity supply company. Mrs Wheller was involved with Red Cross wartime work and was associated with the Albert Street church – the Ladies' Guild and the garden settlement at Chermside. They had a home at 29 Birdwood Terrace, Auchenflower.
