= Michael Scott Fletcher =

Australian Methodist minister

M [Michael] Scott Fletcher (1868–1947) was an Australian Methodist minister, foundation master of King's College, University of Queensland, foundation Master of Wesley College, University of Sydney and held the Chair of Philosophy at the University of Queensland.

== Family ==
Fletcher was born in Auckland, New Zealand, one of eight children of John Fletcher, a teacher and Methodist lay preacher, and his wife Eliza, née Bale. One of his brothers was the Australian minister and evangelist Lionel B. Fletcher. He married Lancashire-born Winifred Davies, a former Royal Prince Alfred Hospital trained nurse in 1896.

== Education ==
Fletcher attended Newington College (1883-1888) and completed a Bachelor of Arts degree (1893) and a Master of Arts degree (1902) at the University of Sydney. From 1909 until 1911 he wrote his doctoral thesis at the University of Oxford.

== University appointments ==
Fletcher returned to Australia in 1912 and was appointed the first master of King's College at the University of Queensland. In 1916 he was appointed foundation master of Wesley College at the University of Sydney. Seven years later he was appointed Professor of Philosophy at Queensland University.

== Death ==
He died in South Brisbane in November 1947 and left a widow, a daughter and a son. His son was the American non-commercial educational television pioneer Cyril Scott Fletcher.
