= John Gladwell Wheen =

Methodist minister

John Gladwell Wheen (died 1929) was a Methodist minister. He served as President-General of the Methodist Church of Australasia from 1926 to 1929.

== Early life ==
John Gladwell Wheen was born at Sheffield, Yorkshire, England, the son of Edwin Wheen. As a young man he was employed by the town clerk of Sheffield, and was later appointed secretary of the Sheffield Public Hospital and Dispensary. He was associated with the Carver Street chapel, and became a departmental superintendent of the Red Hill school, one of the largest in the city, and famous as a source of ministers and mission workers. Here he was associated with the late Rev. J. Woodhouse, who was a member of his class, and who later became his brother-in-law.

Wheen immigrated to Australia in 1882 by the Sabroan (later the training ship Tingira) and settled in Victoria.

== Religious life ==
Wheen entered the Methodist home mission service in 1883, becoming a minister in 1884.

He successfully organised several important funds, and in 1907 he became president of the Victorian and Tasmanian Conference. He had the distinction of being elected to the general conference after he had been ten years in the ministry.

In 1908 Wheen was transferred from Victoria to New South Wales for service in the foreign mission office, and after serving in conjunction with the late Rev. B. Danks for a few years, was appointed general secretary in 1913. For 12 years he carried full responsibility for the missions.

Wheen was elected president of the New South Wales Conference in 1919. Soon after his term expired he was appointed by the general conference as its representative to the British Wesleyan Conference in London, and to the world conference on "faith and order" at Geneva. He returned in February 1921. Owing to ill-health, he retired from the position of general secretary to the Methodist Missionary Society of Australia in 1925.

Wheen was elected and installed for three years as President-General at the general conference of the Methodist Church of Australasia at Brisbane in May 1926. He was regard as one of the most capable administrators in the Methodist Church in Australia. He rellinquished his position as President-General a few months before his death.

== Personal life ==
Wheen married Ellen Lief in 1888. They had three children: E.G. Wheen (a chemist), Ethel Wheen, and Agnes Wheen (a teacher at the Methodist Ladies College in Hawthorn, Melbourne. and headmistress of the Annesley Methodist Girls' College at Bowral in New South Wales.

He lived at 5 Goodwin Avenue, Ashfield.

Wheen died on the morning of Wednesday 13 November 1929 in Sydney, after a short illness, at the age of 71 years. His funeral service was held on Thursday 14 November 1929 at the Ashfield Methodist Church, after which he was cremated at Rookwood Cemetery.

== Legacy ==
A stained glass memorial window depicting "Morning at Gethsemane" in the Ashfield Methodist Church was dedicated to Wheen on Sunday 16 August 1936. It was made by John Ashwin.
