= Kate =

Kate may refer to:

== People and fictional characters ==
- Kate (given name), a list of people and fictional characters with the given name or nickname
- Gyula Káté (born 1982), Hungarian amateur boxer
- Lauren Kate (born 1981), American author of young adult fiction
- ten Kate, a Dutch toponymic surname originally meaning "at the house"

== Arts and entertainment ==
- Kate (TV series), a British drama series (1970–1972)
- Kate (film), a 2021 American action thriller film
- An alternative title of "Crabbit Old Woman", a poem attributed to Phyllis McCormack
- Kate, a young adult novel by Valerie Sherrard
- "Kate" (Ben Folds Five song), 1997
- "Kate" (Johnny Cash song), 1972
- "Kate", a song by Arty
- "Kate (Have I Come Too Early, Too Late)", a song by Irving Berlin, 1947
- The Kate, American TV series

== Ships ==
- CSS Kate, a Confederate blockade runner during the American Civil War
- USS Kate (1864), a Union Navy steamer during the American Civil War
- SS Kate (tug), a wooden steamer built in Australia in 1883

== Other uses ==
- Tropical Storm Kate (disambiguation), various hurricanes, typhoons, cyclones and tropical storms
- Nakajima B5N, a Japanese torpedo bomber, Allied reporting name "Kate"
- 2156 Kate, an asteroid
- Kate (text editor), a text editor developed by the KDE free software community
- Kate the woodpecker, the mascot of Kate editor
- KATE, a radio station licensed to Albert Lea, Minnesota, United States
- Kâte language, a Papuan language
- Cotter (farmer) house, called Kate in German
