= List of shipwrecks in April 1914 =

The list of shipwrecks in April 1914 includes ships sunk, foundered, grounded, or otherwise lost during April 1914.

== 1 April ==
List of shipwrecks: 1 April 1914
Ship	State	Description
Gungner	Norway	The schooner sprang a leak and was abandoned in the North Sea 50 nautical miles (93 km) off the Naze, Essex, United Kingdom. Her crew were rescued.
Othello	Sweden	The cargo ship ran aground at Kyrenia, Cyprus. She was refloated on 8 April.
358	French Navy	The torpedo boat struck rocks and sank in the Mediterranean Sea west of Saint-Tropez, Var. Her crew were rescued.

== 2 April ==
List of shipwrecks: 2 April 1914
Ship	State	Description
USRC Hartley	United States Revenue Cutter Service	The harbor vessel sank alongside her wharf at San Francisco. Later raised, but never repaired, she was sold on 1 August 1919.
Kate	Australia	The steam tug collided with the ferry Bellubera (Australia) in Sydney Harbour off Dobroyd Head, New South Wales, Australia, and sank; the lighter Kate was towing capsized. Bellubera rescued Kate's four-man crew.
Maine	flag unknown	The coaster collided with José de Aramburu (Spain) in the English Channel and sank. Her crew were rescued by José de Aramburu.
Normand	France	The coaster ran aground in the English Channel on the Beagle Rock, Cornwall, United Kingdom and sank. Her crew were rescued.

== 3 April ==
List of shipwrecks: 3 April 1914
Ship	State	Description
"Frederick"	United States	The Barge was wrecked on the Bar/ North Jetty at the Mouth of the Siuslaw River.

== 5 April ==
List of shipwrecks: 5 April 1914
Ship	State	Description
Gannet	United Kingdom	The coaster collided with Minna Schuldt (Germany) in the River Thames at Erith, Kent and sank. Her crew were rescued. She was refloated on 8 April and beached.

== 6 April ==
List of shipwrecks: 6 April 1914
Ship	State	Description
Croydon	United Kingdom	The cargo ship was driven ashore on Barbuda and wrecked.
Maritime	United Kingdom	The cargo ship passed Fernando de Noronha, Brazil on this date bound for Campana, Argentina. Believed to have foundered on or before 12 April at 20°58′S 40°00′W with the loss of all hands.

== 7 April ==
List of shipwrecks: 7 April 1914
Ship	State	Description
Umzimvubu	United Kingdom	The coaster ran aground at Port St. Johns, South Africa. She was refloated on 13 April.

== 8 April ==
List of shipwrecks: 8 April 1914
Ship	State	Description
Orellana	Norway	The barque was sunk in a collision with Peter H. Crovell (flag unknown) in the Atlantic Ocean in 17 fathoms (102 ft; 31 m) of water 20 miles (32 km) off Barnegat, New Jersey. Three killed. Her masts were removed with explosives on 17 May as a hazard to navigation by a crew from USRC Mohawk.

== 9 April ==
List of shipwrecks: 9 April 1914
Ship	State	Description
Cairnhill	United Kingdom	The cargo ship was abandoned in the Pacific Ocean 100 nautical miles (190 km) off New Ireland following the breaking of her propeller shaft. Six weeks later, she was towed in to Namantanai, New Guinea.

== 15 April ==
List of shipwrecks: 15 April 1914
Ship	State	Description
Charles K. Buckley	United States	The lumber schooner was wrecked at Long Beach, New Jersey in a gale after dragging anchor. The captain's wife, mate (his brother) and two other crewmen died when the vessel's boat swamped. The captain was killed when the deck cargo broke loose. Five more crew died of exposure, there was only one survivor.
Mabel L. Stevens	United States	The steamer sank in Five Mile River near South Norwalk, Connecticut.
Median	United Kingdom	The cargo ship ran aground on the Salmedina Bank, Cartagena, Colombia. She was refloated on 23 April.

== 16 April ==
List of shipwrecks: 16 April 1914
Ship	State	Description
Calabria	United Kingdom	The cargo ship was wrecked at Esbjerg, Denmark.

== 17 April ==
List of shipwrecks: 17 April 1914
Ship	State	Description
Highland Piper	United Kingdom	The ocean liner ran aground on the English Bank, Montevideo, Uruguay and was severely damaged. She was refloated on 29 April.

== 19 April ==
List of shipwrecks: 19 April 1914
Ship	State	Description
La Roserina	flag unknown	The cargo ship ran aground in the River Plate. She was refloated on 27 April.

== 20 April ==
List of shipwrecks: 20 April 1914
Ship	State	Description
Kathleen	United Kingdom	The cargo ship ran aground on Castle Island, Bermuda. She was refloated on 27 April.

== 21 April ==
List of shipwrecks: 21 April 1914
Ship	State	Description
Edith	United Kingdom	The ketch collided with Thirlby (United Kingdom) in the Bristol Channel and sank with the loss of a crew member. The survivors were rescued by Thirlby.
Envermeu	United Kingdom	The cargo ship ran aground on the Kimmeridge Ledge, in the English Channel off Swanage, Dorset. She was refloated on 1 May.

== 22 April ==
List of shipwrecks: 22 April 1914
Ship	State	Description
Carbineer	United Kingdom	The cargo ship collided with the protected cruiser HMS Isis (Royal Navy) and consequently sank in the English Channel 1.5 nautical miles (2.8 km) south south east of the Owers Lightship (United Kingdom). Her crew were rescued by HMS Isis.
Glencoe	United Kingdom	The Thames barge foundered in Studland Bay. Her crew were rescued.

== 23 April ==
List of shipwrecks: 23 April 1914
Ship	State	Description
Loire	Belgium	The coaster foundered in the English Channel off Sept Îles, Côtes-du-Nord, France. Her crew survived.

== 27 April ==
List of shipwrecks: 27 April 1914
Ship	State	Description
Kometa	Russia	The tanker exploded and sank in the Mediterranean Sea 20 nautical miles (37 km; 23 mi) west of Algiers, Algeria with the loss of fifteen of the 30 people on board.
Montana	United States	After running onto a reef, floating free without damage, and anchoring off a small island fronting Redoubt Bay (56°55′30″N 135°22′00″W), about 8.75 nautical miles (16.2 km; 10.1 mi) south-southeast of Sitka Sound in Southeast Alaska, the 65-gross register ton motor halibut schooner was set on fire when her gasoline engine backfired. The motor vessels Niagara and Star towed her to the beach, but she became a total loss. Her crew of 15 survived.
Werner	Germany	The coaster collided with Rolandsbeck (Germany) at Glückstadt, Schleswig-Holstein and sank.
Yurimaguas	Peru	The coaster foundered in the Purus River.

== 28 April ==
List of shipwrecks: 28 April 1914
Ship	State	Description
Benjamin Noble	United States	The steamer foundered in a gale with all 16 hands in Lake Superior. The wreck was located in 2004.
Hugh Hogan	United States	The lumber schooner ran aground on the south spit of the Suislaw River Bar in heavy seas. Refloated 2 May, her cargo was lost. Her crew was rescued by the United States Life Saving Service.
Penelope	Greece	The cargo ship ran aground near Cape Bougaroni, Algeria. Salvage operations were abandoned on 13 May.
Werner	Germany	The cargo ship collided with Rolandseck (Germany) and sank in the River Elbe at Glückstadt.

== 29 April ==
List of shipwrecks: 29 April 1914
Ship	State	Description
Cleo I	United Kingdom	The Admiralty-requisitioned cargo ship was scuttled in Water Sound, Scapa Flow as a blockship.

== 30 April ==
List of shipwrecks: 30 April 1914
Ship	State	Description
Ystad	Sweden	The cargo ship collided with Liv (Norway) at Cuxhaven, Lower Saxony, Germany and sank with the loss of one life. Her crew were saved.
