= Ten Kate =

Ten Kate is a Dutch toponymic surname originally meaning "at the house". The modern Dutch word kot ("kennel") still reminds of the archaic words kate, kote, and kotte for "house". People with this surname include:

- Herman Frederik Carel ten Kate (artist) (1822–1891), Dutch painter and engraver
- Herman Frederik Carel ten Kate (anthropologist) (1858–1931), Dutch anthropologist, son of the above
- Jan Jakob Lodewijk ten Kate (1819–1889), Dutch prose writer and poet
- Lambert ten Kate (1674–1731), Dutch linguist
- Marti ten Kate (born 1958), Dutch retired long-distance runner
- Monica Ten-Kate, American psychic and star of the reality TV show Monica the Medium

== See also ==
- Ten Cate, Dutch surname with the same origin
- Ten Kate Racing, a Dutch-based motorcycle racing team founded by Gerrit ten Kate
