= Herman Frederik Carel ten Kate =

Herman Frederik Carel ten Kate may refer to:

- Herman Frederik Carel ten Kate (artist) (1822–1891), Dutch artist
- Herman Frederik Carel ten Kate (anthropologist) (1858–1931), Dutch anthropologist
