= Look Closer =

Look Closer may refer to:

- "Crabbit Old Woman", a poem by Phyllis McCormack that is also titled "Look Closer"
- "Look Closer", an episode of the television series Judging Amy

== See also ==
- A Closer Look (disambiguation)
