= A Closer Look =

A Closer Look may refer to:

- A Closer Look (Babyface album), 1991
- A Closer Look (Steve Harley & Cockney Rebel album), 1975
- A Closer Look, a recurring current events and news commentary segment on American late-night show Late Night with Seth Meyers
- A Closer Look, an upcoming TV series that will premiere on November 5, 2020, on UMC

== See also ==
- Look Closer (disambiguation)
