= Ten Cate =

Ten Cate is a Dutch toponymic surname originally meaning "at the house". It may refer to:

- Cees ten Cate (1890–1972), Dutch football striker
- Henk ten Cate (born 1954), Dutch football winger and coach
- Siebe Johannes ten Cate (1858–1908), Dutch impressionist painter

== See also ==
- Ten Kate, Dutch surname with the same origin
- Bank Ten Cate & Cie, a Dutch bank
- Theo ten Caat (born 1964), Dutch football forward
