= Dobroyd Head =

Place in Sydney, Australia

Coordinates: 33°48′36″S 151°16′24″E

Dobroyd Head is a point or headland in the Northern Beaches local government area, in the suburb of Balgowlah Heights, New South Wales, Australia. It is part of the Sydney Harbour National Park, which contains examples of ecosystems at risk such as coastal heath. Tania Park is located to the immediate north-east, and contains the 2MWM 90.3 transmitter. There is a lookout sited on the headland named after Arabanoo, the first Aboriginal man to live among European settlers who was captured in Manly Cove in 1788.

== History ==
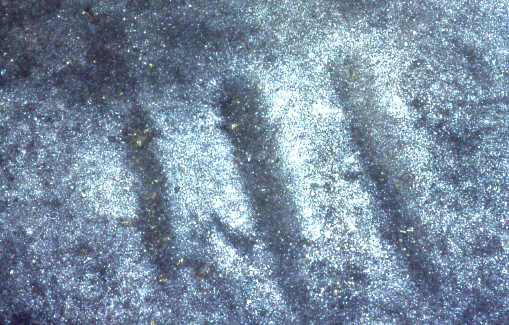
Aboriginal grinding grooves.

In January 1788 Captain Arthur Phillip noted Aboriginal people living in caves at what is now Wellings Reserve, Balgowlah Heights, and there are a number of Aboriginal sites recorded in the area, including a midden at Reef Beach, which was partly eroded by a storm in May 1974, when human remains were exposed. What is now Dobroyd Head was originally named "Dobroyd Point" (which is now the name of a locality in Haberfield in the Inner West) by Simeon Lord (1771–1840), a landowner in the district in the early 19th century. Dobroyd Castle, its namesake, was the home of his mother, Ann Fielden, prior to her marriage in 1764. On his death in 1840, he gifted the land to the Crown, with a stipulation that the name must be kept.

In 1871, the Secretary for Lands, Bowie Wilson, set aside the area of 100 hectares comprising the Dobroyd headland as a defence reserve, but excluded all privately owned lands, such as Reef Beach, Forty Baskets Beach, Grotto Point, Castle Rock and Clontarf. On 14 August 1874, prominent surveyor and hydrographer, Commander John Thomas Ewing Gowlland was drowned in an accident off the headland. In August 1963 the Manly, Warringah and Pittwater Historical Society unveiled a plaque at Dobroyd Head commemorating him. In 1914, the government steamer, SS Kate, was struck and sunk by the Manly ferry Bellubera off the headland. The Dobroyd Scenic Drive, funded by the council, was opened in 1938 by Manly mayor Percy Nolan.

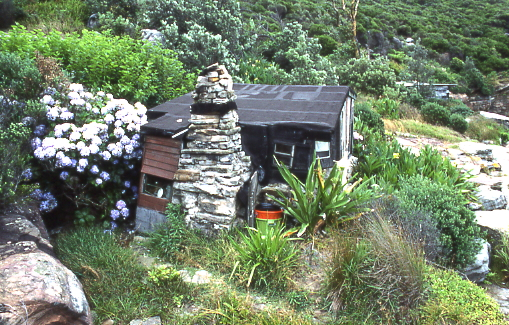
Fisherman's hut, Dobroyd Head.

Between 1923 and 1963, various small cabins and shacks were built around Crater Cove on the headland, they were for use as weekenders and retreats and remained occupied until the 1980s.

Various subdivisions for the development of Balgowlah Heights occurred throughout the next 80 years until in 1959–1960, when Manly Council learned that land near Cutler Road and Tabalum Road was to be subdivided and objected to any development and sale of land below Cutler Road. This movement to preserve the lands of Dobroyd Head for public recreation was led by alderman Frank Preacher, and on 17 October 1960, Lands Minister Jack Renshaw met representatives of Manly Council on the site. Renshaw later approved the removal of these lands from the sale of land and transferred responsibility for its preservation to Manly council. In 1975, responsibilities changed again when the area was proclaimed as part of the Sydney Harbour National Park. A 2015 article in the Manly Daily later revealed that Manly Council had voted in June 1997 to erect a plaque to honour Renshaw, alderman Preacher and Manly Council's role in the preservation of the headland, but no action has since been taken to carry it out.
