= USS Kate =

Gunboat of the United States Navy

History

United States
- Ordered: as Kate B. Porter
- Laid down: date unknown
- Launched: 1864
- Acquired: 23 December 1864
- Commissioned: 23 December 1864
- Decommissioned: 25 March 1866
- Stricken: 1866 (est.)
- Fate: Sold, 29 March 1866

General characteristics
- Displacement: 242 tons
- Length: not known
- Beam: not known
- Draft: 5 ft 6 in (1.68 m)
- Propulsion: steam engine
- Speed: 5 knots
- Complement: not known
- Armament: two 20-pounder Parrott rifles; six 24-pounder howitzers; two 12-pounder howitzers
- Armor: tinclad

USS Kate was a steamer acquired by the Union Navy during the American Civil War. She was used by the Union Navy as a gunboat in support of the Union Navy blockade of Confederate waterways.

== Construction ==
Kate was built as Kate B. Porter at Belle Vernon, Pennsylvania, in 1864, and was purchased at Cincinnati, Ohio, by the Navy from J. B. Porter & Son, 23 December 1864; converted into a gunboat and commissioned at Mound City, Illinois, Acting Volunteer Lt. W. R. Wells in command.

== Life ==
Kate's first duty was patrolling the Mississippi River from Mound City to Memphis, Tennessee, during the closing days of the Civil War. The tinclad gunboat was ordered downstream 28 April 1865 to intercept Confederate President Jefferson Davis in his flight toward freedom in exile. After his capture, she returned up the river to assist in the demobilization of the squadron.

After the war, she was sent to the Tennessee River to clear away the hulks of a number of sunken gunboats and barges. In August she was ordered to Jefferson Barracks Reserve to discharge her ordnance and to assist in disarming other vessels.

One of the last vessels in the Mississippi River to remain on naval duty, she decommissioned at Mound City 25 March 1866 and was sold at public auction there 4 days later. The gunboat was redocumented James J. Trover 12 April 1866 and stranded 300 miles below Fort Benton, Montana, 21 June 1867.
