= Jan Jakob Lodewijk ten Kate =

Dutch divine, prose writer and poet (1819–1889)

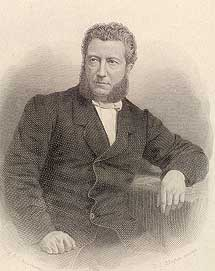
Jan Jakob Lodewijk ten Kate.

Jan Jakob Lodewijk ten Kate (December 23, 1819 – December 24, 1889) was a Dutch divine, prose writer and poet.

== Life ==
He was born at The Hague. He started in life as a lawyer's clerk. It was his friend, Dr Heldring, pastor at Hemmen, in Gelderland, who, discovering in Ten Kate the germs of poetical genius, enabled him to study theology at the University of Utrecht (1838–43).

Having completed his studies, Ten Kate became pastor at Middelburg, Amsterdam, and other places, meanwhile developing well-nigh ceaseless activity, both in prose and lyric poetry. Among his prose works may be mentioned the travel papers (Rhine, 1861; Italy, 1857–62), Christelijke Overdenkingen ("Thoughts of a Christian," 1840-52), and other religious studies.

His early poetry was in the main original. The best known of his poems were:

- Ahasverus op de Grimsel ("Ahasuerus on the Grimsel," 1840)
- Zangen des Tijds ("Songs of the Times," 1841)
- Legenden en Mengelpoëzie ("Legends and Miscellaneous Poetry," 1846)
- In den Bloemkof ("In the Flower Garden," 1851)
- De Schepping ("The Creation," 1866)
- De Planeten ("The Planets," 1869)
- De Jaargetijden ("The Seasons," 1871)
- De Psalmen ("The Psalms," 1874)
- De Vrouw in het Nederlandsch Lied ("Woman in Dutch Song," 1882)
- Palm-takken en Dichtbloemen ("Palm Branches and Poetical Flowers," 1884)

Ten Kate reached the pinnacle of his poetic fame in The Creation, The Planets, and The Seasons. These poems certainly show a masterly grasp of his mother tongue and a wonderful facility of expression, coupled with graceful vigour and fertile fancy. These qualities he also plentifully displayed in the innumerable translations he made of many of the masterpieces of foreign poetry in nearly every European language.

He had not only an extraordinary aptitude for learning alien idioms, but also the gift of translating foreign lyrics into clear, fluent and beautiful Dutch verse. Ten Kate's versatility in this respect has never been equalled; it extended from Tasso and Andersen to Dante, Schiller, Victor Hugo, Milton, Tennyson and Longfellow. Ten Kate died in Amsterdam in 1889.

His complete Poetic Works were published after his death in 12 volumes (Leiden, 1891).

== Family ==
He was the uncle of the anthropologist, Herman Frederik Carel ten Kate, and the father of painter Jan Jacob Lodewijk ten Kate (1850-1929).
