= Bellubera =

Ferry operated by the Port Jackson & Manly Steamship Company

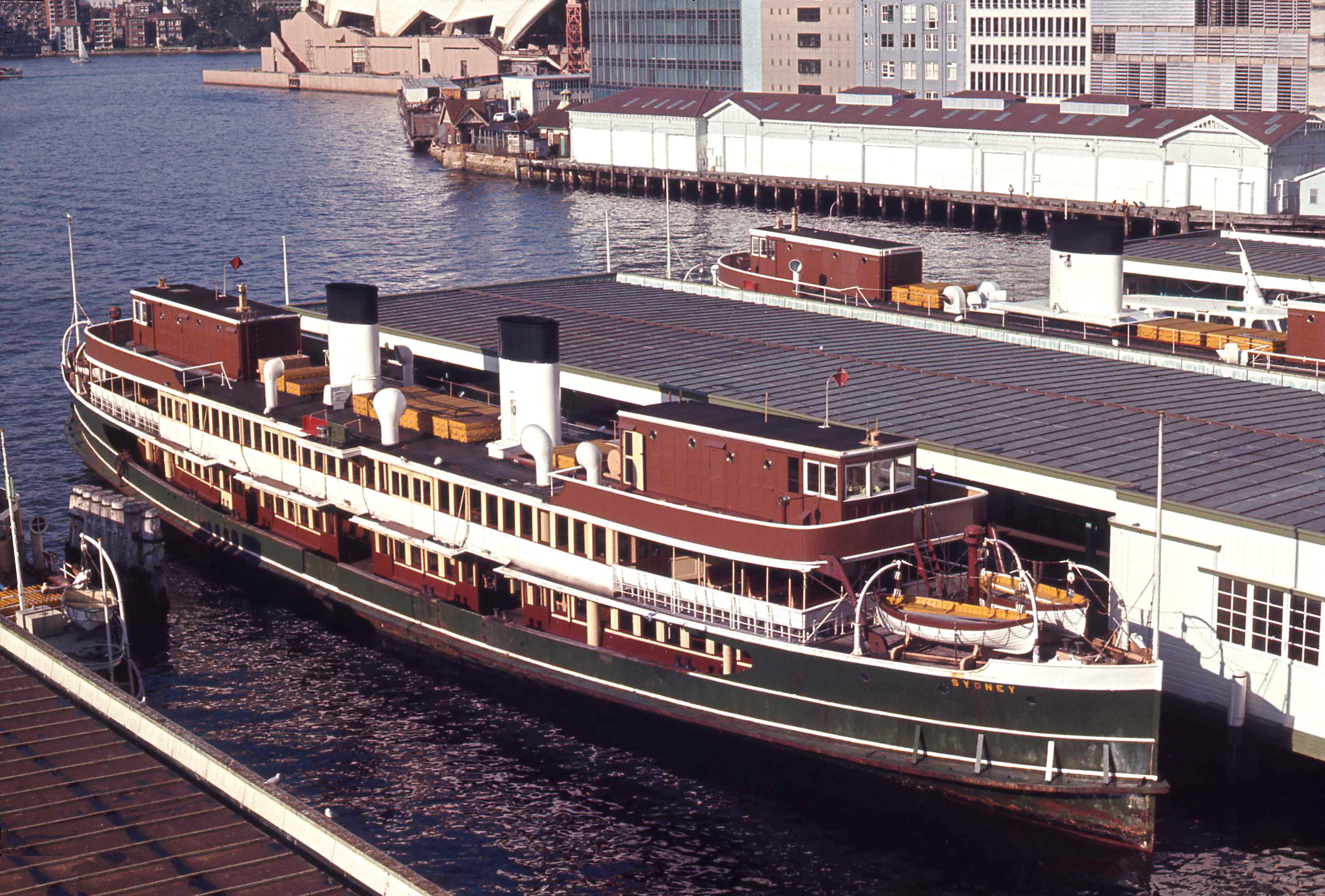
- At Circular Quay, 1970, as a diesel-electric vessel, late in her career

History
- Name: Bellubera
- Operator: Port Jackson & Manly Steamship Company
- Port of registry: Sydney
- Route: Manly
- Builder: Mort's Dock
- Launched: 26 April 1910
- Out of service: 29 November 1973
- Identification: IMO number: 5040043
- Fate: Scuttled 1 August 1980

General characteristics
- Tonnage: 499 tons (1936: 505 tons)
- Length: 63 m (206 ft 8 in)
- Beam: 9.75 m (32 ft 0 in)
- Decks: 2

Bellubera was a ferry operated by the Port Jackson & Manly Steamship Company on the Manly service. Launched in 1910, she was the third of six "Binngarra-type" vessels. Upon her 1936 conversion from steam power, she became the first diesel-electric vessel in Australia. She was decommissioned in 1973, and scuttled at sea in 1980.

Due to many misfortunes in her 63-year service life, she was nicknamed the "Hoodoo Ship". Two of her masters died at the wheel, two crew members died when she was gutted by fire in 1936, and the owner of a motor launch was killed when Bellubera ran it down and sank her.

The name "bellubera" is thought to be an Australian Aboriginal word meaning "pretty lady" or "beautiful woman".

== Background ==
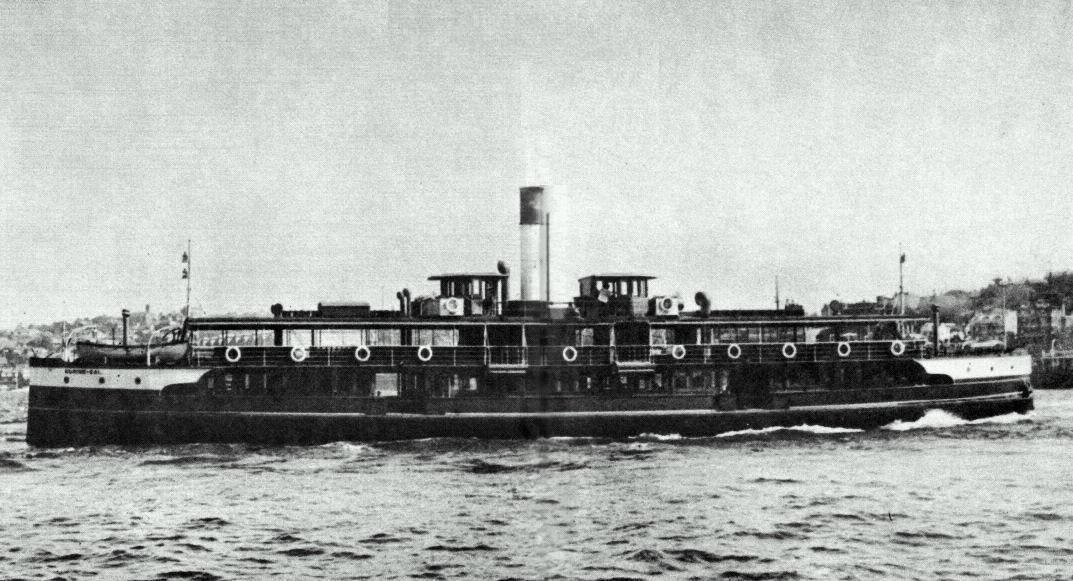
Kuring-gai (1901) was the forerunner to the "Bingarra-type" vessels including Bellubera. Note the wheel houses located midships compared to Bellubera's at the ends of the sun deck.

The Port Jackson & Manly Steamship Company's fleet transitioned comparatively late to screw propelled vessels and the fleet comprised mostly paddle steamers until the early years of the twentieth century. The difficulty of turning in the narrow bays of Sydney Harbour - particularly in the busy Circular Quay terminus in Sydney Cove - required the use of double-ended vessels. However, a double-ended screw configuration was particularly difficult for the fine bows that Manly ferries required for both speed and heavy seas. Further, a propeller at the leading forward end of a vessel reduced speed considerably. In the prosperous early twentieth century, this speed drawback was overcome by increasing engine size and power.

The first screw ferries on the Manly run were two innovative Walter Reeks–designed vessels; SS Manly (1896), and SS Kuring-gai (1901), which were to become the fore-runners of the Binngarra-class ferries. They both had high forecastles at either to help her run through the deep-sea conditions across the Sydney Heads. The steel-hulled Kuring-gai was larger and she further refined the basic design to be similar to the subsequent and larger Binngarra-class vessels. Manly and Kuring-gai had both, however, followed paddle steamer design with their bridges around the midships funnels. Whereas the Binngarra-class vessels would have their wheelhouses at either end of their promenade decks.

== Design and construction ==
The Binngarra-class" ferries, Binngarra (1905), Burra-Bra (1908), Bellubera (1910), Balgowlah (1912), Barrenjoey (1913), and Baragoola (1922), were designed by Mort's Dock and Engineering, initially under the guidance of former chief draughtsman Andrew Christie. The first five were built at Mort's Woolwich yard and Baragoola was built at the Balmain yard. They were among the largest ships built in Australian yards at the time and, on the admission of Mort's executives, were built by the dock more for prestige than profit. Build costs were higher in Australia than in the United Kingdom, but this was offset by the cost of sailing them out to Australia.

Launched on 6 April 1910 by Mrs J. Fyfe, Bellubera was the third of six Binngarra-type vessels. She was a near identical sister to Barrenjoey (later North Head) and Balgowlah (1912), and similar to the slightly smaller Binngarra (1905), Burra Bra (1908) and Baragoola (1922). She was 499 tons and 64.0 metres (210 ft 0 in) long. As built, she was powered by triple expansion steam engine providing 123 horsepower (92 kW) and was able to make up to 15 knots (28 km/h; 17 mph).

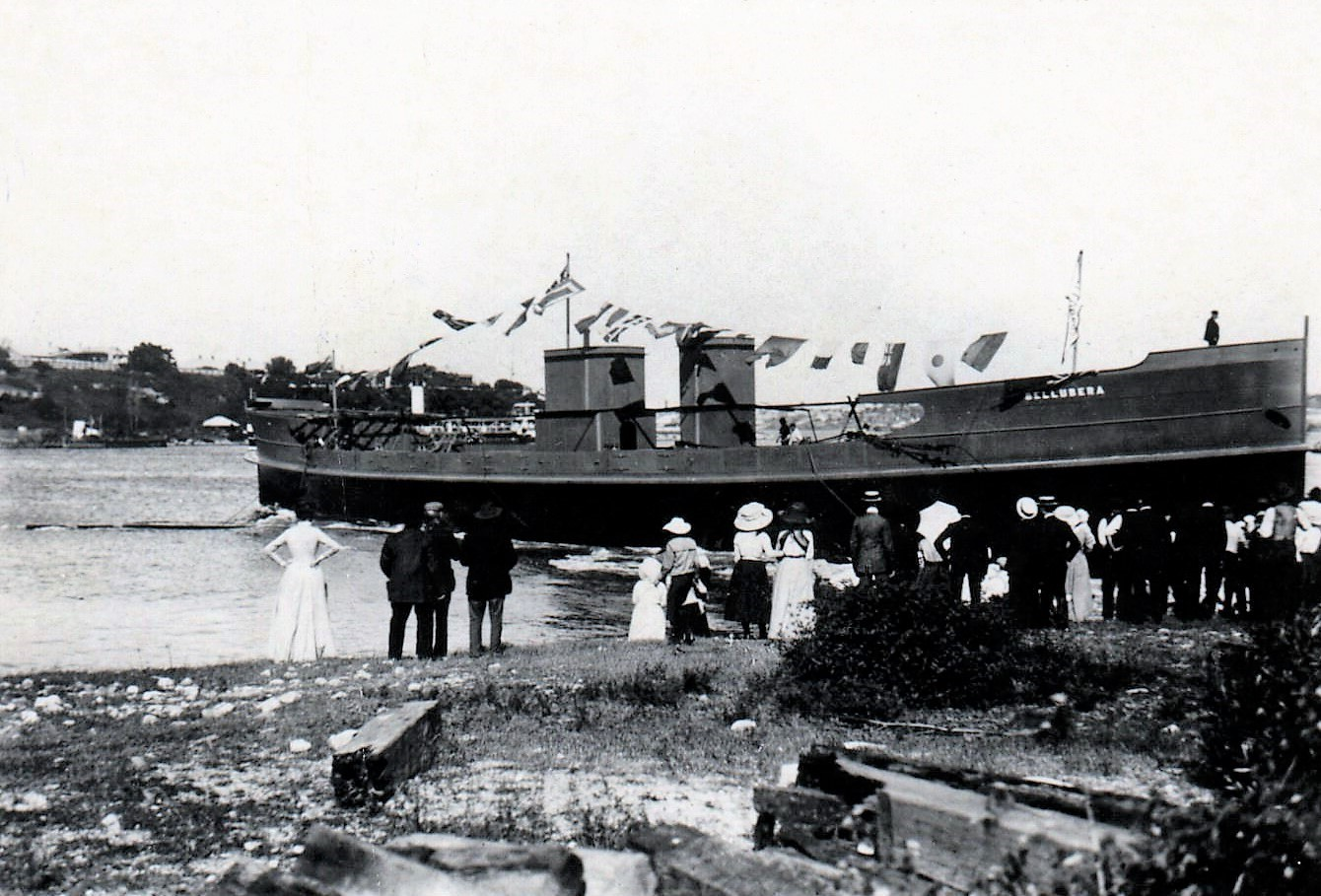
Launch day, 26 April 1910

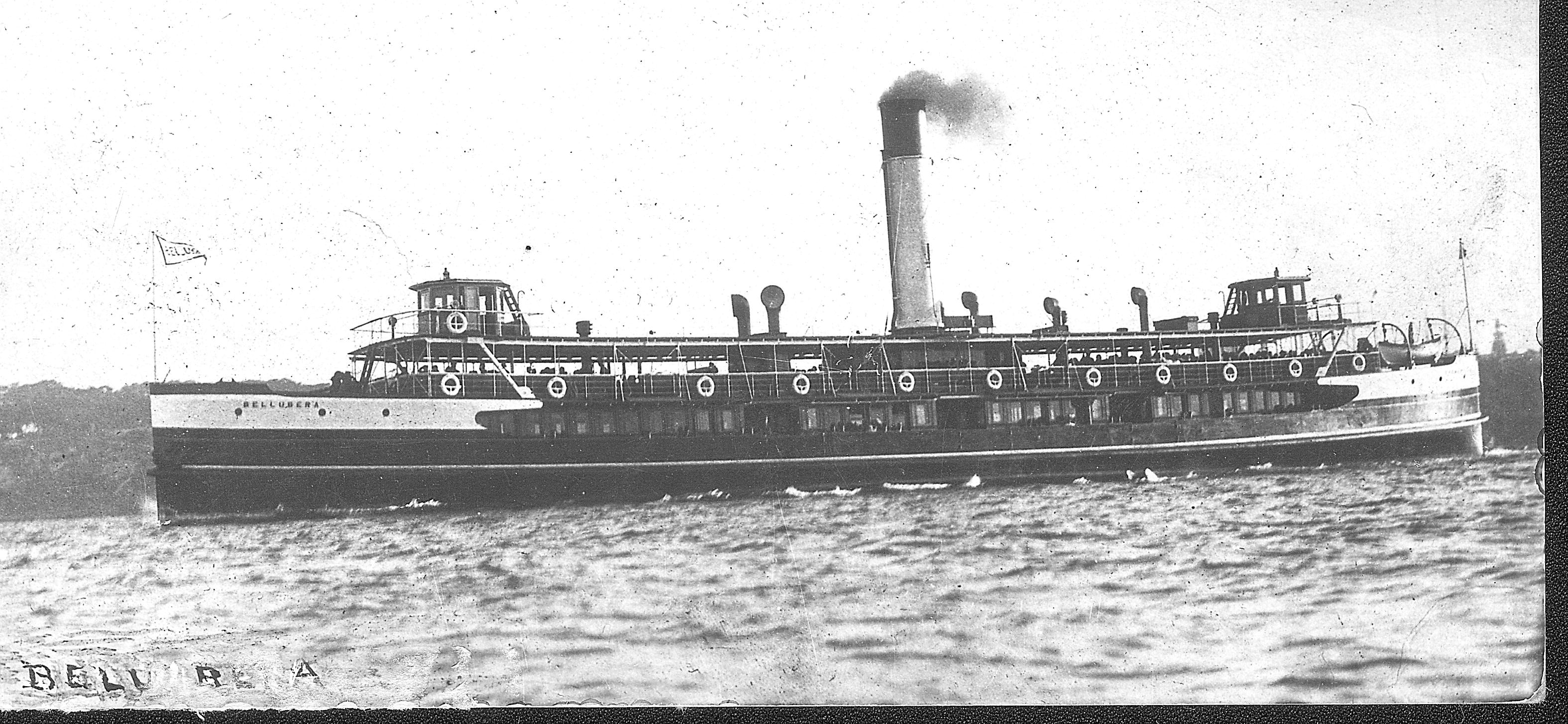

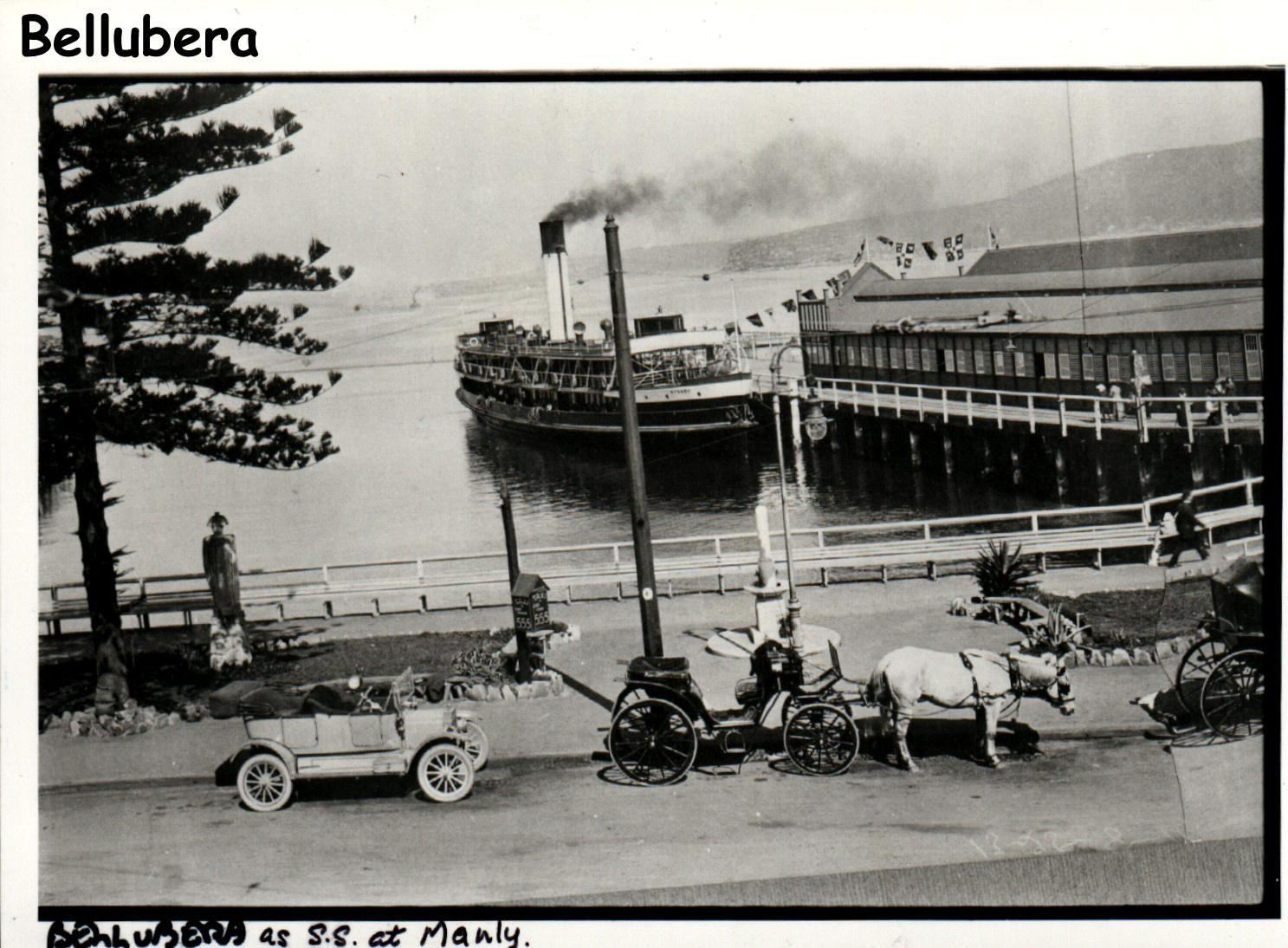
At Manly Wharf in as-built condition, 1910s

== Service history and configuration changes ==
The exorbitant cost and difficulty in replacing the large expensive steel hulled Binngarra-type vessels saw the Bellubera, along with the Balgowlah, Barrenjoey, and Baragoola retained and significantly modified. In the 1920s, all four had officers' cabins attached to their wheelhouses. Beginning with Barrenjoey in 1930, and then in 1931-32 Balgowlah, Baragoola, and Bellubera over 1931–32, had their open upper passenger decks enclosed.

In 1936 with her boilers nearing the end of their service life, Bellubera's original steam engines were replaced by four five-cylinder Harland & Wolff diesel engines (1,800 bhp, 1,300 kW) which drove two British Thompson-Houston diesel engines, which could push her to 16 knots (30 km/h; 18 mph). Her single funnel was replaced by two, the second funnel being a dummy mounted for appearance. She became the first diesel-electric powered vessel in Australia. The new engines increased her service speed to 18 knots, but increased vibrations throughout the vessel making her less popular with passengers.

In 1948, Bellubera, along with Balgowlah and Baragoola, was fitted with the larger wheelhouse/cabin structures that they would sport until the rest of their ferry careers. In 1954, she was taken to the State Dockyard where she was partially replated, repainted, and re-engined with three seven-cylinder British Thompson-Houston diesel engines that drove two English Electric electric engines.

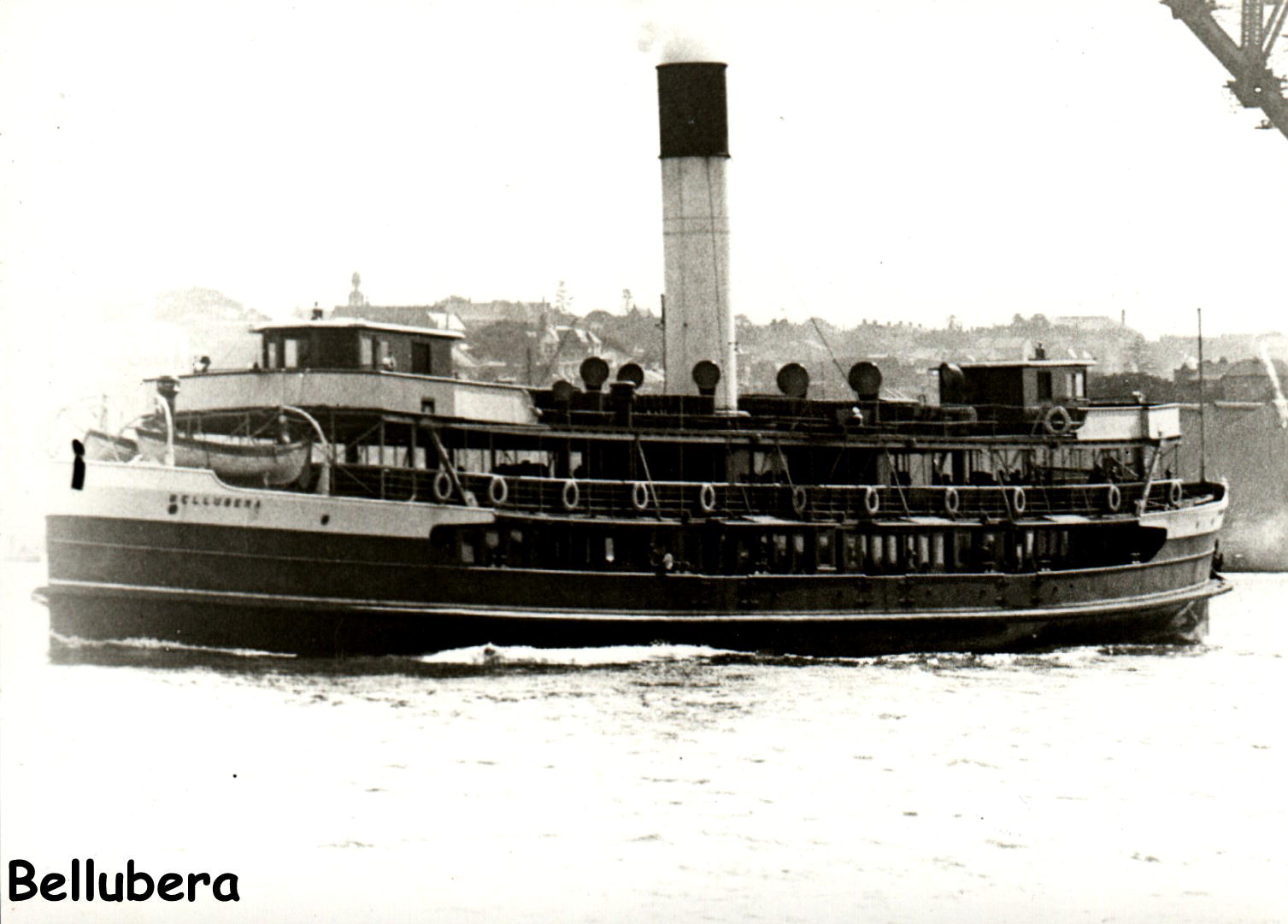
With extended wheelhouses and original open upper decks, 1930s

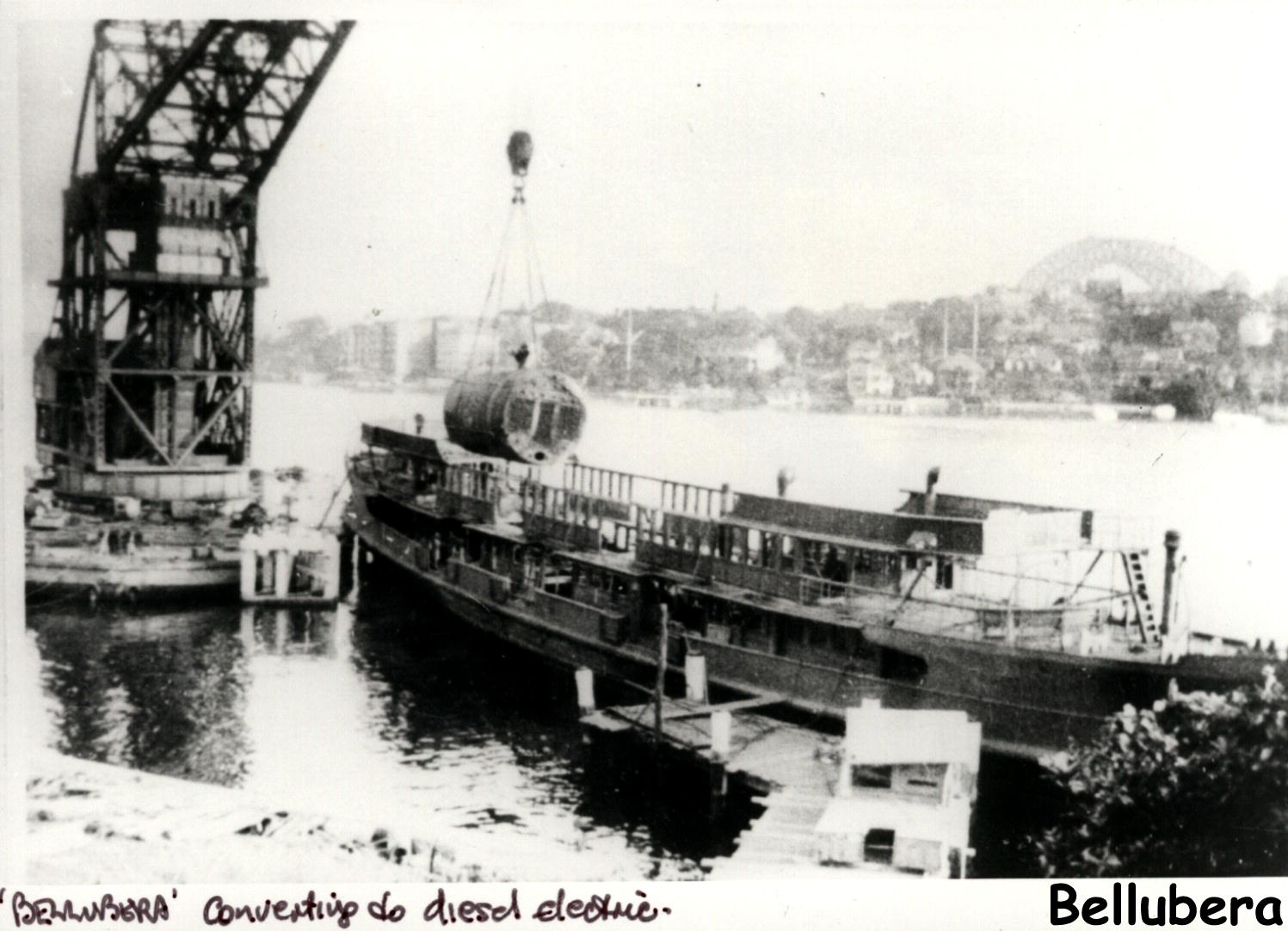
Removal of boiler during conversion from steam to diesel-electric propulsion, 1935/36

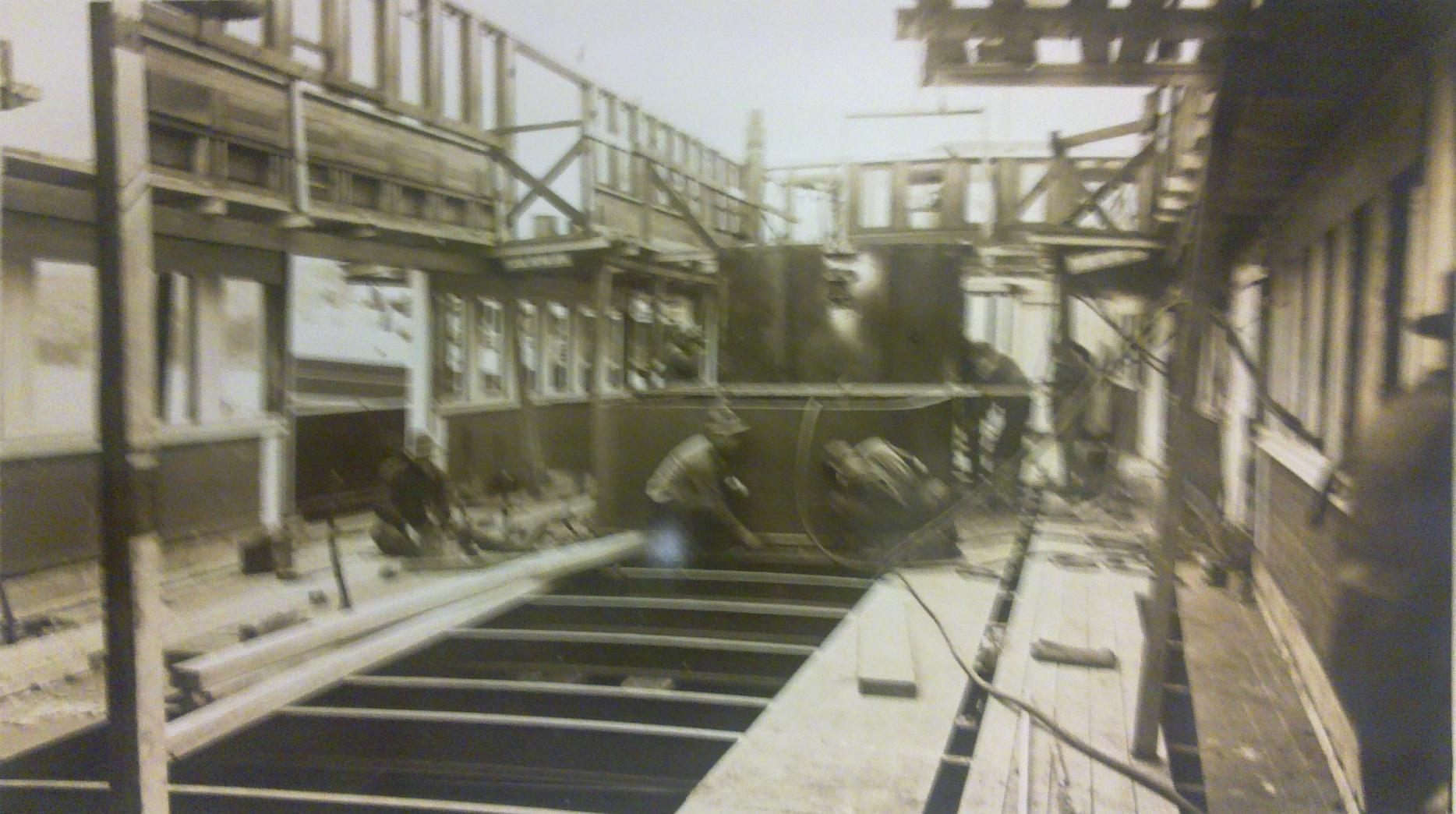
Conversion to diesel-electric, 1936

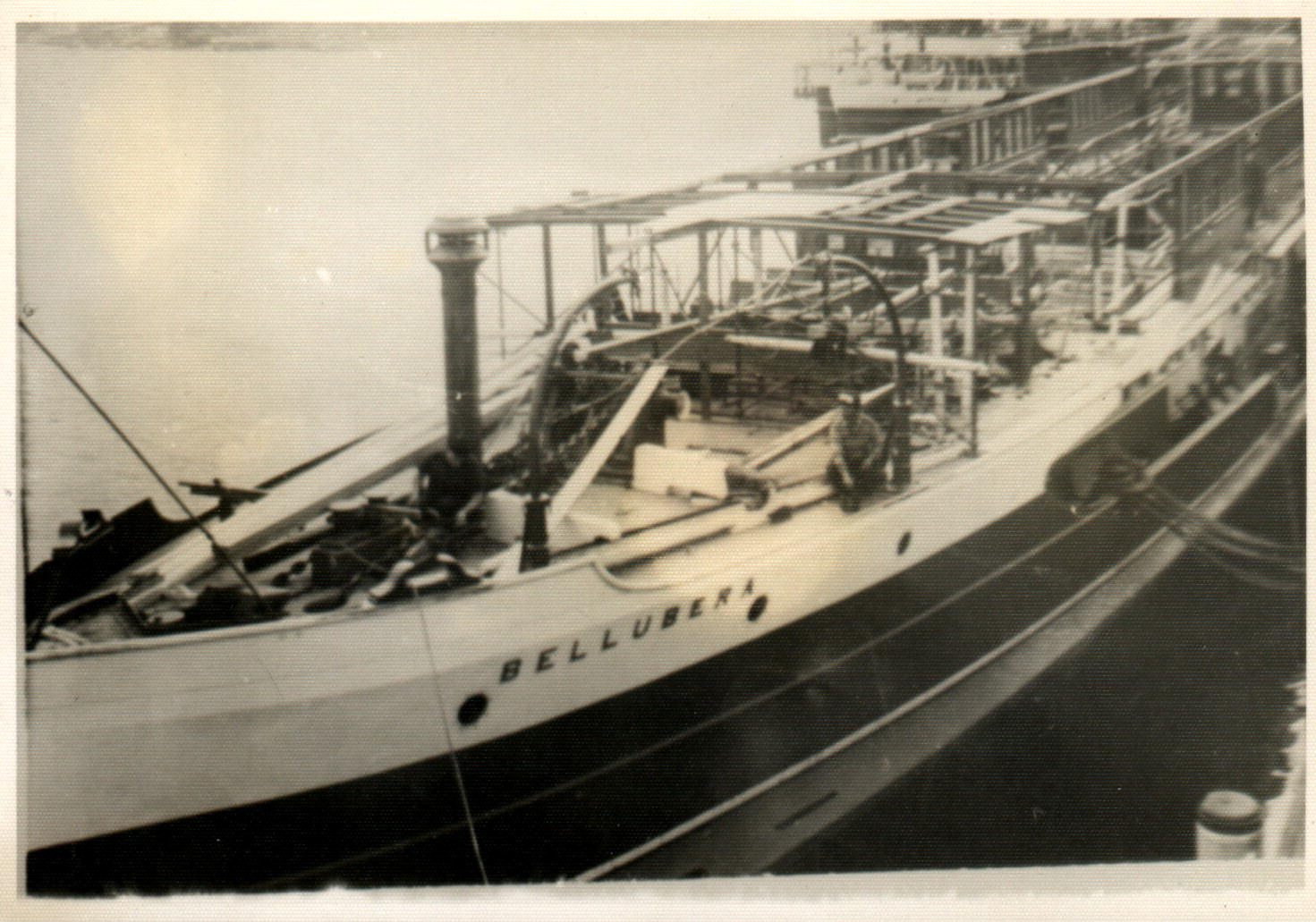
Rebuild of superstructure during conversion to diesel-electric propulsion

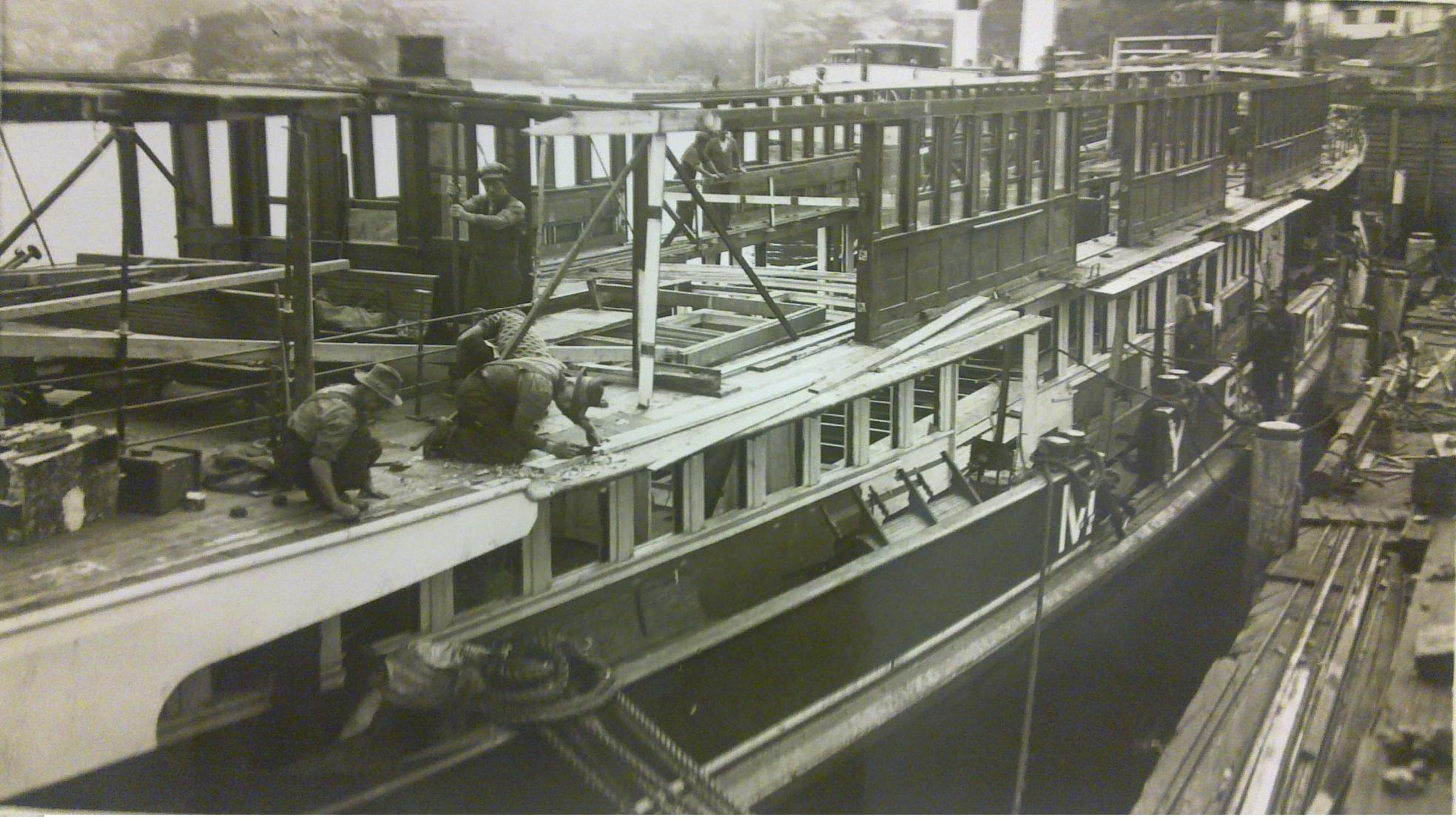
Rebuild of superstructure during conversion to diesel-electric propulsion

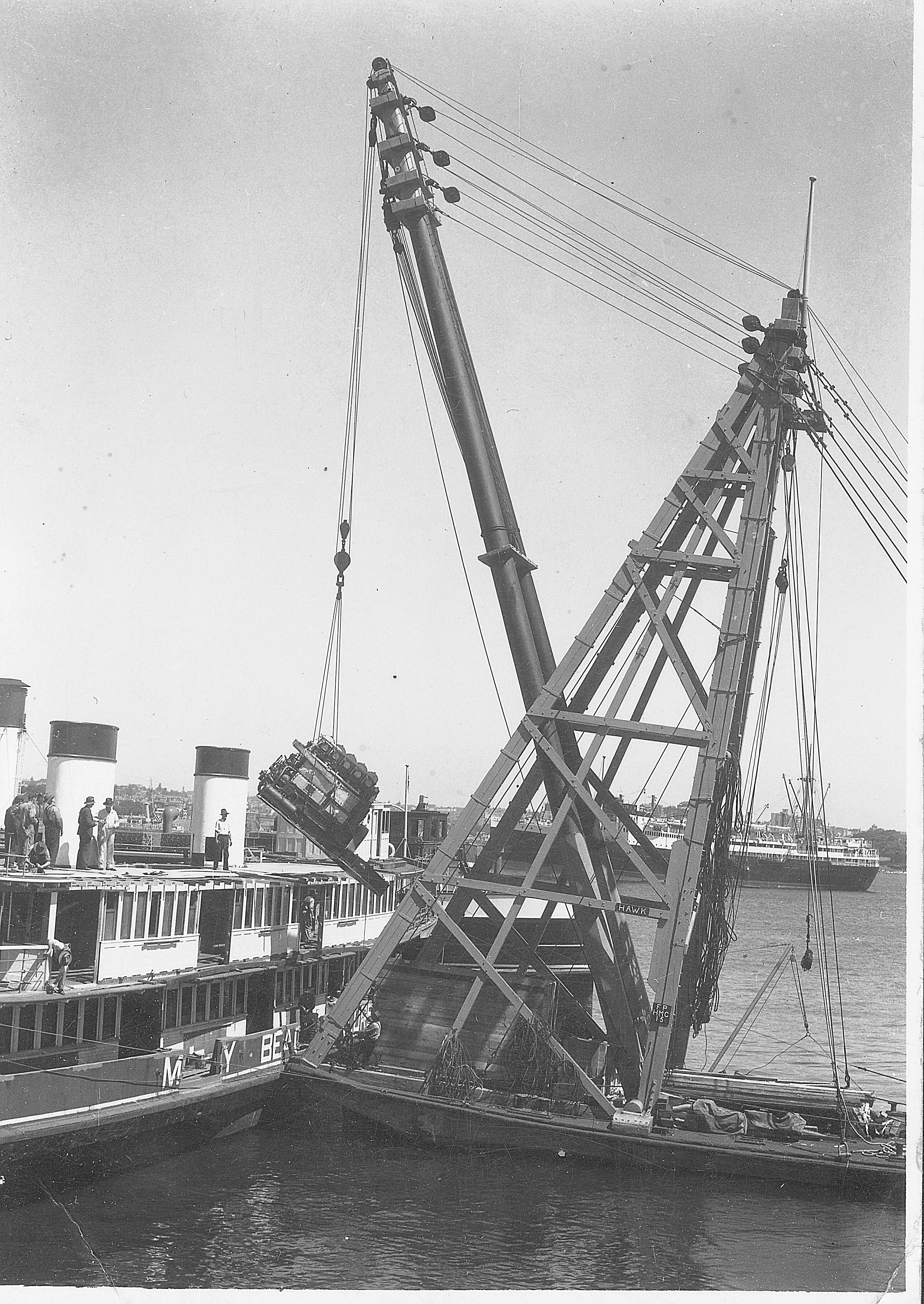
Diesel generators being installed during conversion to diesel-electric, 1936

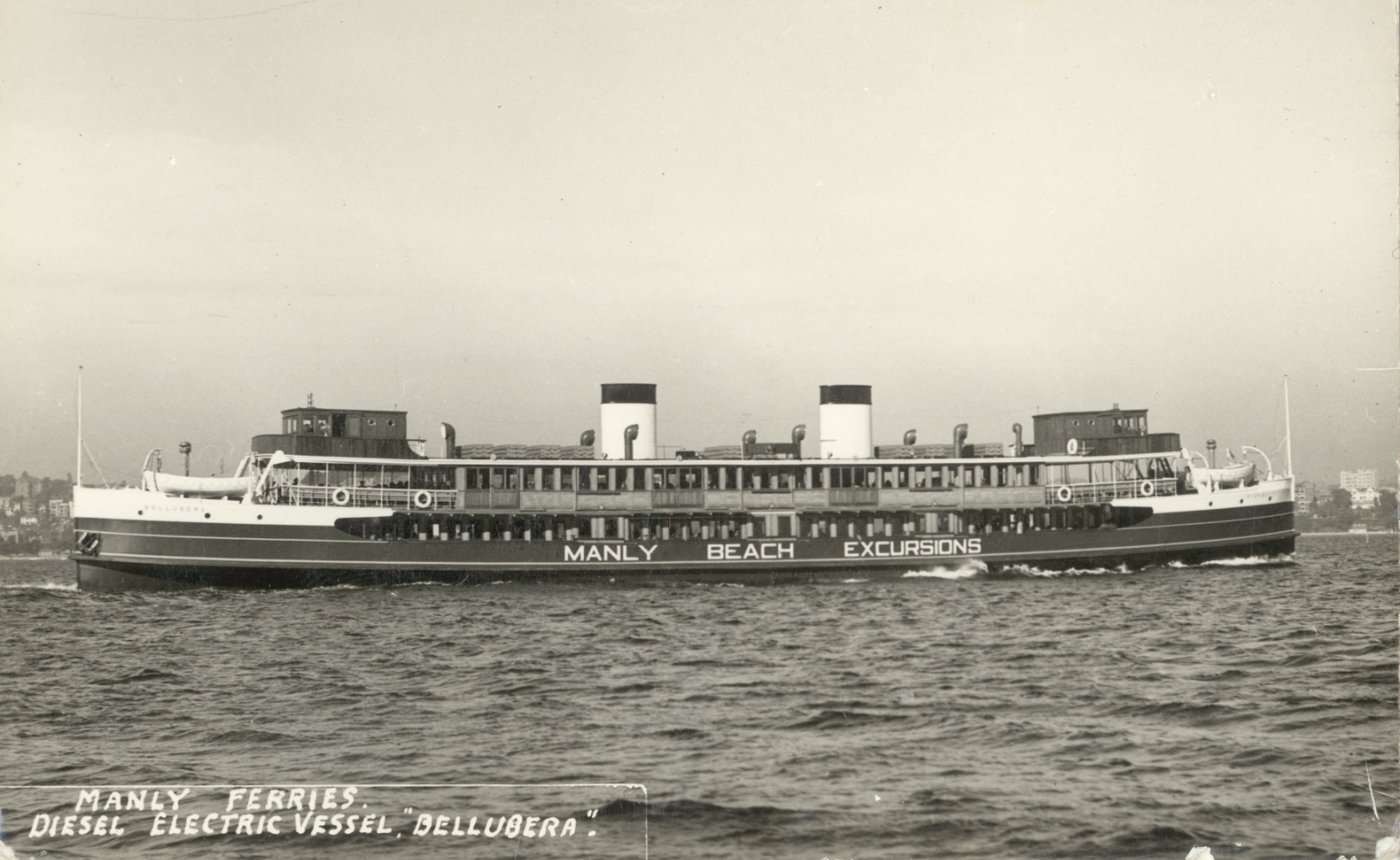
Post diesel-electric conversion and prior to fire, 1936

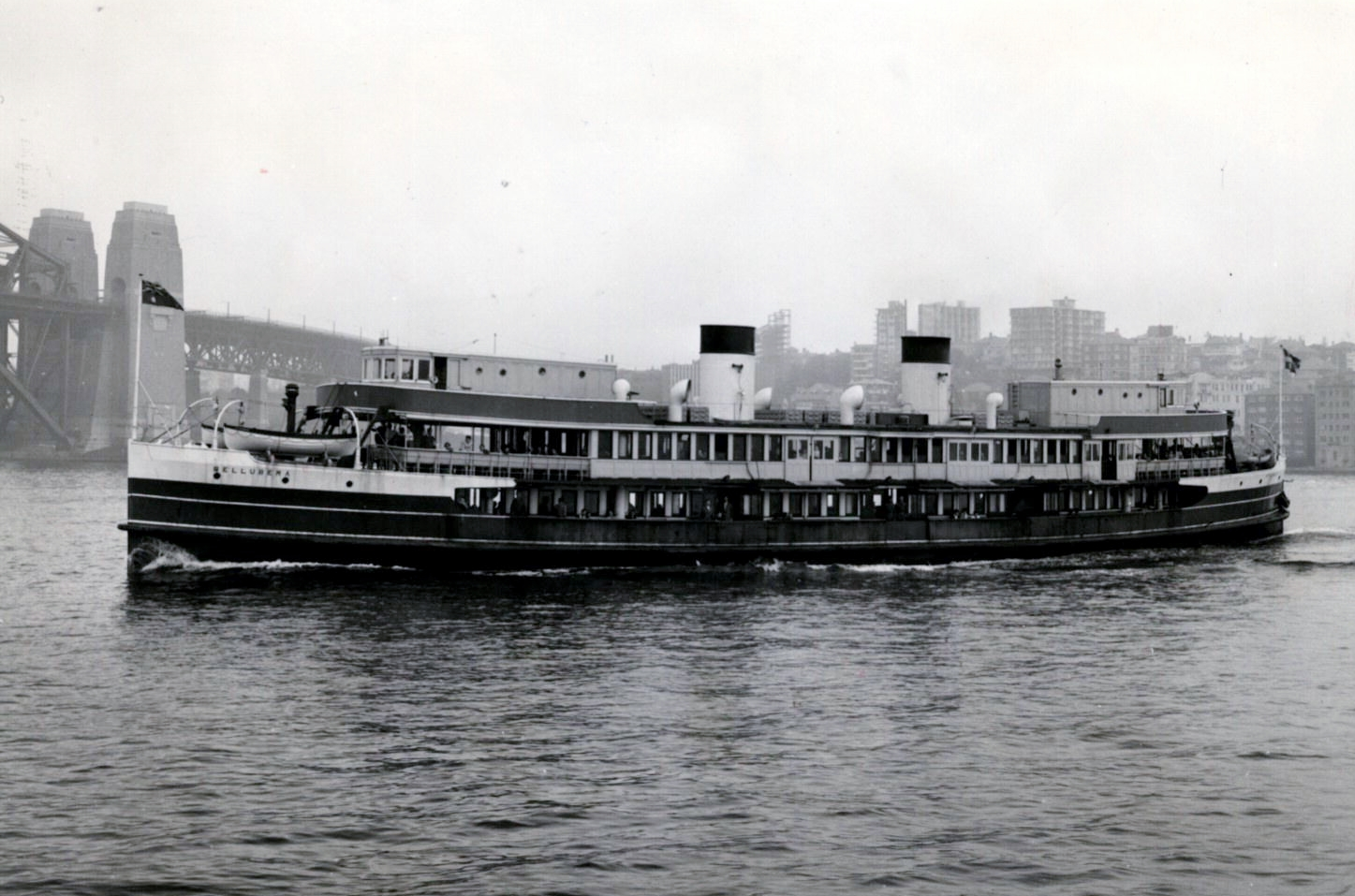
Rounding Bennelong Point and approaching Circular Quay, 1966

== Misadventures ==
Due to many misfortunes, she was nicknamed the "Hoodoo Ship". She collided with at least four vessels, sinking two of them, seven people died through direct association with the ferry and at least seven people fell or jumped off the ferry.

On 2 April 1914, she collided with the steam tug Kate off Dobroyd Head, sinking Kate in seconds and capsizing the lighter Kate was towing; Bellubera rescued Kate's four-man crew. In 1933, Bellubera collided with the smaller ferry, Kaikai near Circular Quay. Slight damage was done to the sponson and bulwarks of Kaikai and steel Bellubera was slightly dented. There were no injuries.

On 16 November 1936, fire broke out aboard Bellubera while she was moored at the Kurraba Point depot while workmen were repairing a steel plate on the roof of the upper deck. A welder's oxy-acetylene torch set alight the leather seats in the saloon and within five minutes the entire ship was ablaze. Four men were trapped below decks, with one dying that night in hospital and a second a few days later. Another suffered leg burns and spent 21 months in hospital. The superstructure was gutted and the hull significantly damaged. Bellubera was rebuilt at the Cockatoo Island Dockyard and re-entered service in October 1937.

In 1941, Bellubera collided with the 30-foot launch, Sydbridge, cutting the boat in half and sinking it with its owner whose body was found nine days later. On 6 February 1946, her master, Captain Walter Dohrn, collapsed and died at the wheel as the vessel was making its way across the Heads towards Manly. On 5 September of that year, a young women fell overboard. In 1946, a passenger fell overboard and drowned, and in the same year, Bellubera collided with a naval launch killing the helmsman. In October 1960, Bellubera collided with the 7,000-ton Norwegian freighter Taurus but received only minor damage continuing her run to Circular Quay. Her master, Captain Albert Villiers, died at the wheel in February 1961 while berthing her at the Kurraba Point depot. Five years later Bellubera collided with the dredge WD66.

On 28 February 1970, en route from Manly, Bellubera collided with the Royal Australian Navy Ship, HMAS Parramatta as it was backing out of the naval depot near Chowder Bay. She inflicted a 2 m × 3 m (6 ft 7 in × 9 ft 10 in) hole in the warship, whilst only suffering minor damage herself. Navy personnel covered the Parramatta's damage with a tarpaulin to hide it from press photographers, while Bellubera resumed her journey. On 23 July 1973, heavy seas damaged doors and seats.

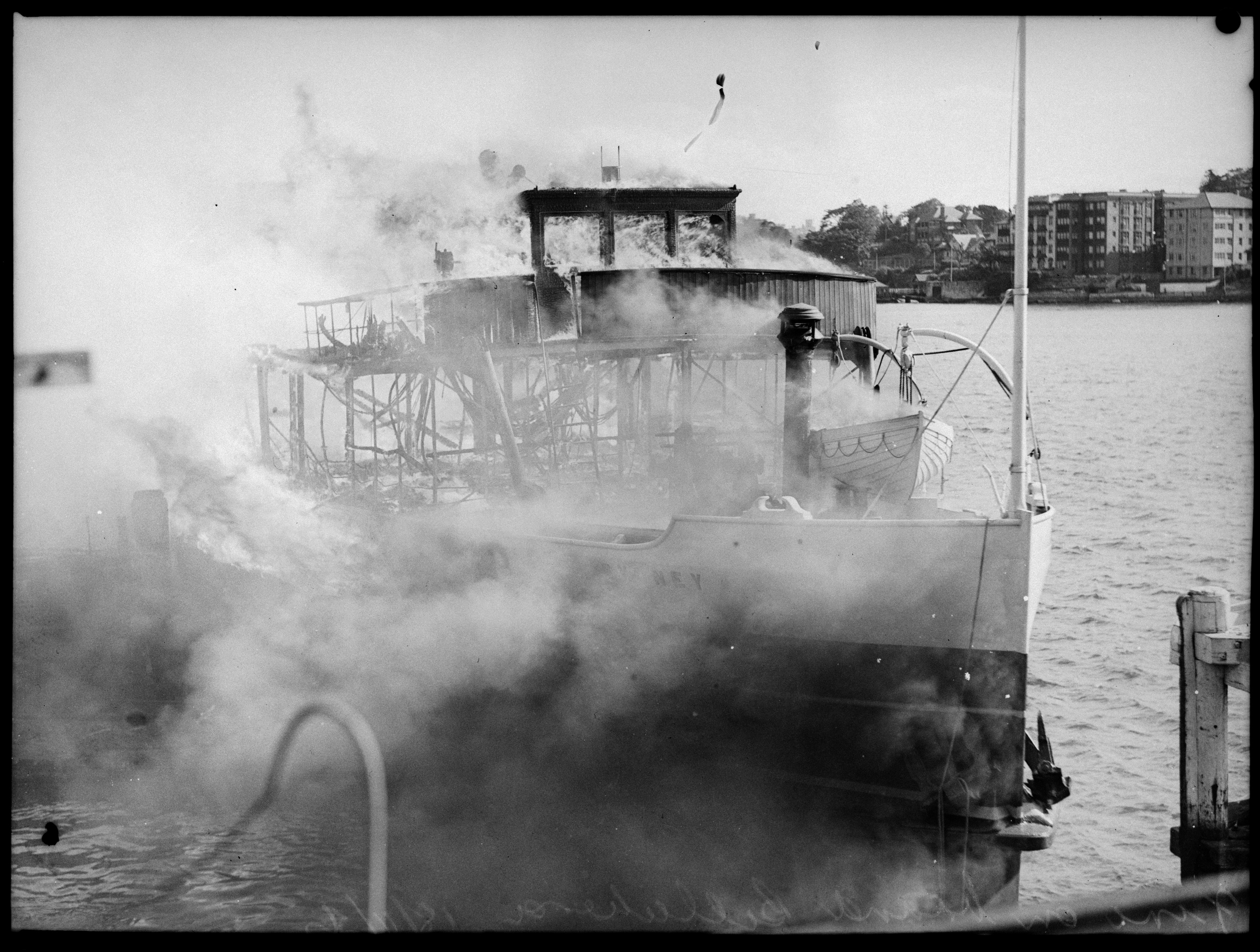

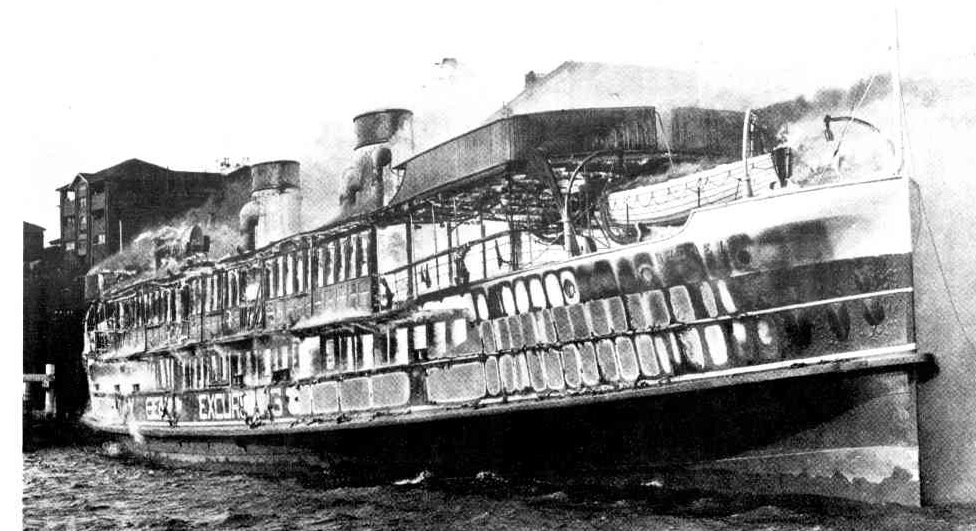
Well alight, Kurraba Point base 1936. Two crew died.

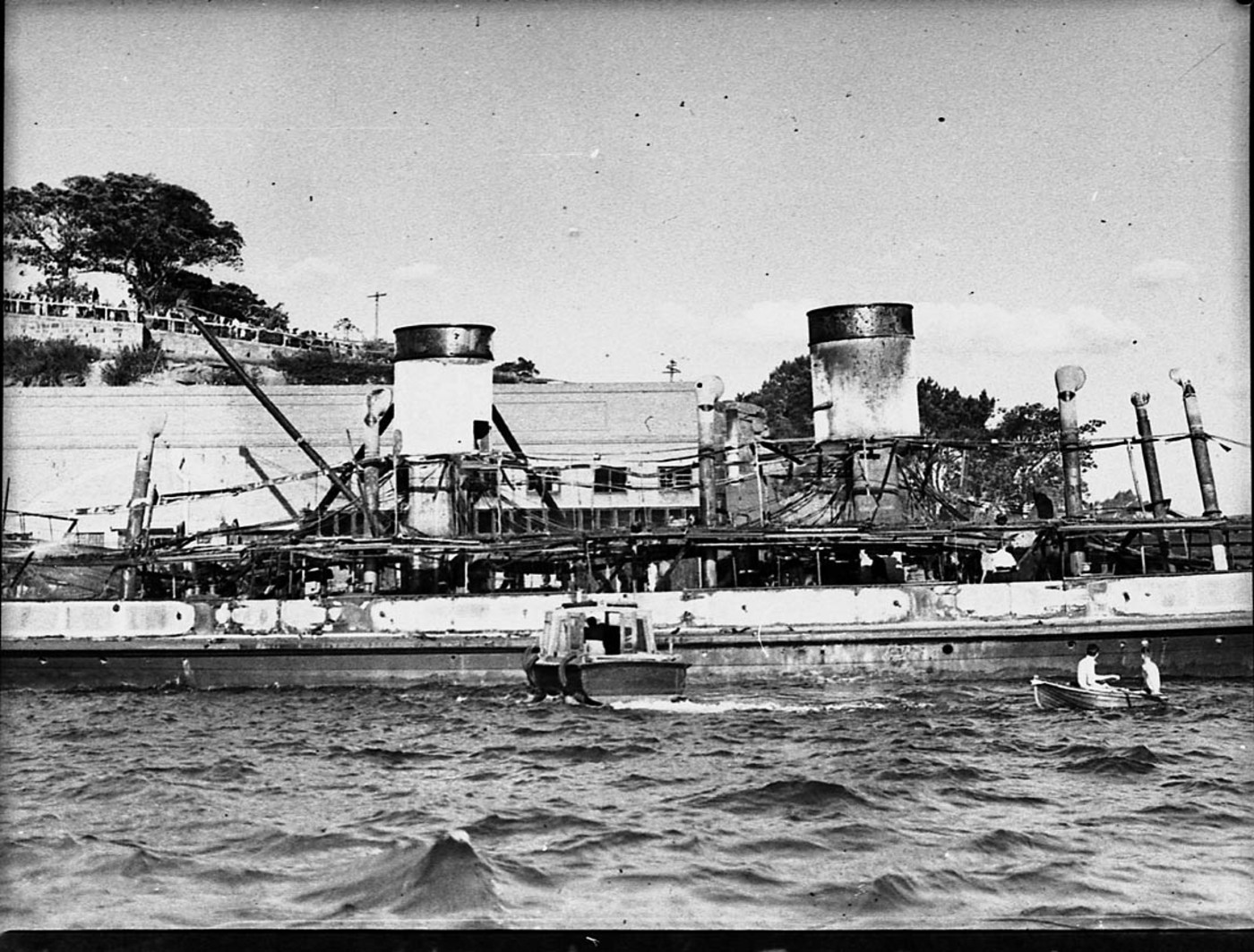
After the fire. People watch from Kurraba Road above

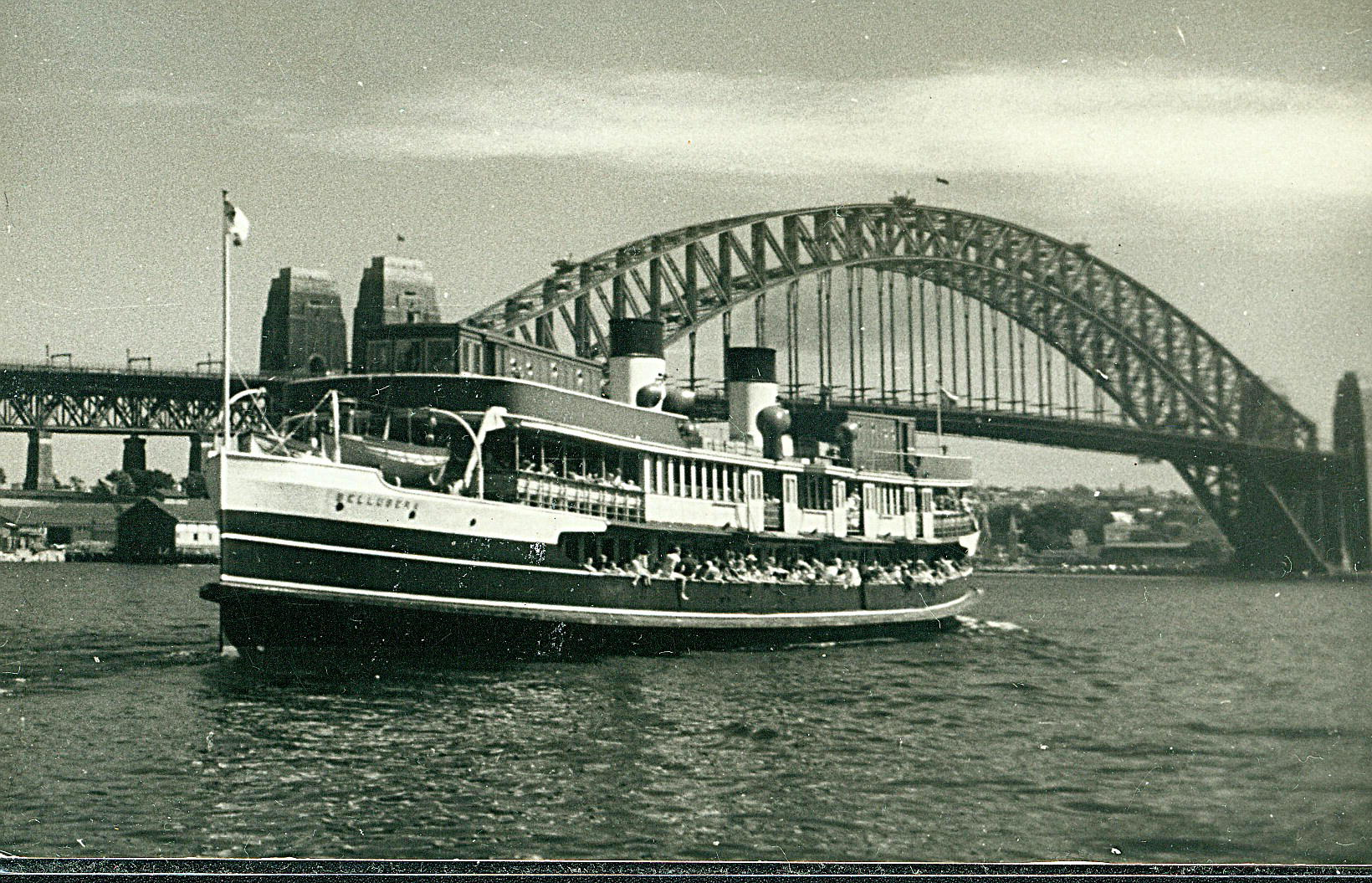
At Circular Quay 1938, rebuilt after the 1936 fire

== Retirement and demise ==
Bellubera was taken out of service on 29 November 1973. Her service life of sixty-three years was a record for a Manly ferry, that would be beaten by the North Head, formerly Barrenjoey. At this time, the Manly services had been taken over by Brambles Limited and the service struggled and ships were in poor condition. She was sold in 1975 to a company named Trouble Shooter, so certain equipment could be stripped and installed into the ex-Royal Australian Navy Ton-class minesweeper HMAS Gull. Bellubera's English Electric diesels were removed and returned to the Public Transport Commission to support Baragoola and North Head in service. Bellubera was towed to sea by tug Betts Bay and scuttled off Long Reef on 1 August 1980 and rests on her side in two pieces in 45 metres (148 ft) of water.

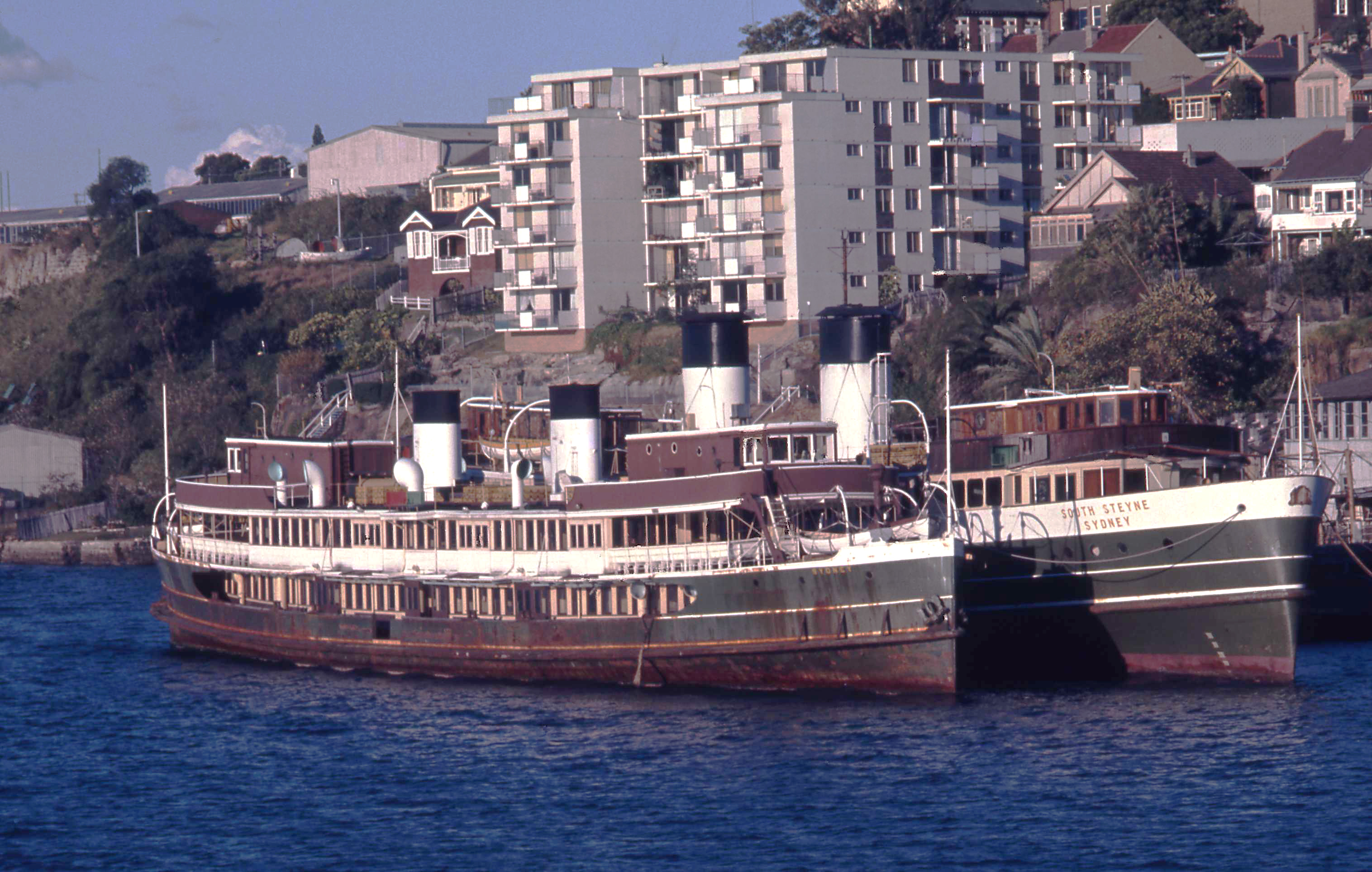
Laid up with the larger South Steyne, Balmain 1970s

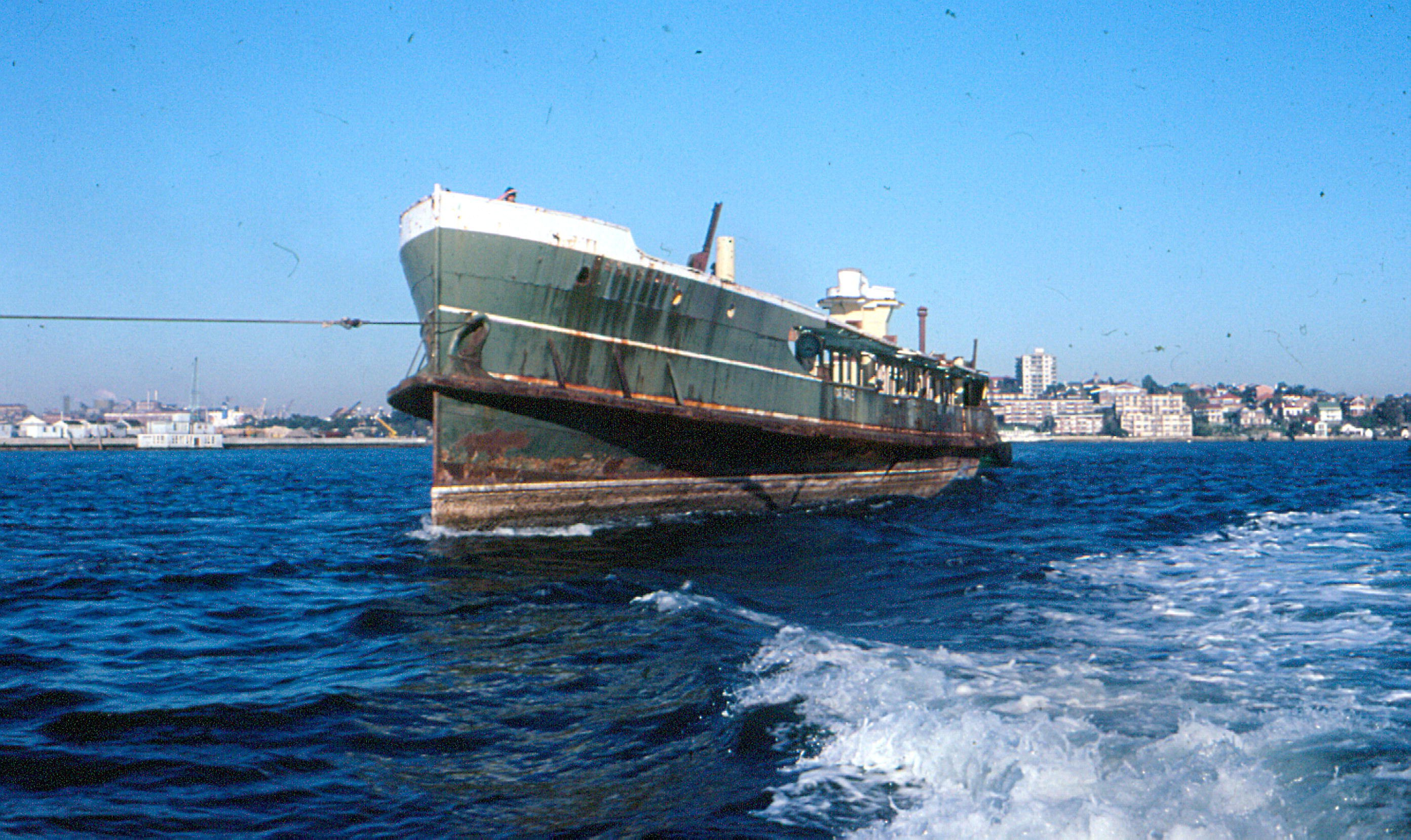
Being towed out of Sydney Harbour for scuttling at sea, August 1980

== See also ==
- List of Sydney Harbour ferries
- Timeline of Sydney Harbour ferries
