= Herman Frederik Carel ten Kate (artist) =

Dutch painter (1822–1891)

Herman Frederik Carel ten Kate, the Elder
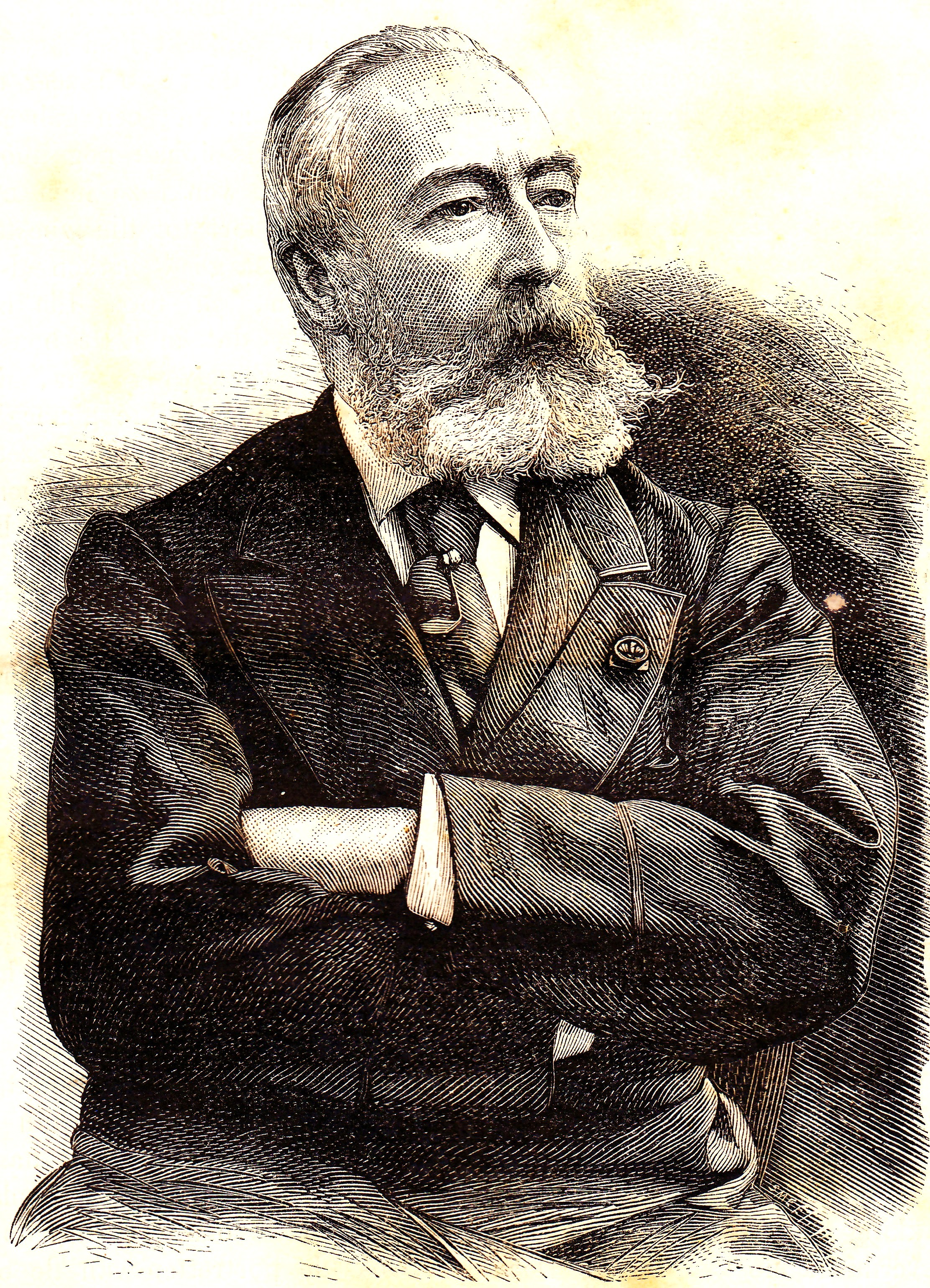
- Born: 16 February 1822; The Hague
- Died: 26 March 1891 (aged 69); The Hague
- Spouse: Married
- Children: Herman Frederik Carel ten Kate, the younger

Herman Frederik Carel, or Herman ten Kate, the Elder (16 February 1822 – 26 March 1891), was a Dutch artist known for his paintings, drawings, and prints. He was notable as a teacher and renowned for his watercolours and paintings of historical genre with emphasis on military figures. David Bles, Alexander Hugo Bakker Korff and Charles Rochussen were his contemporary artists who followed the same painting genre. He received royal patronage under King William III of the Netherlands.

== Early life ==
He was born in The Hague on 16 February 1822, the son of Jan Herman ten Kate (1789–1860), and Johanna Henriette Adriana de Witte van Haemstede (1792–1858). He was a student of Cornelis Kruseman from 1837 to 1841. After his education, he traveled to Belgium, Germany, Italy and France during 1841–42. In Paris, Jean-Louis Ernest Meissonier advised him on his painting. On his return from his travels, he studied at the Municipal Academy (1842) and at the Royal Academy of Art (1841–42).

== Career ==
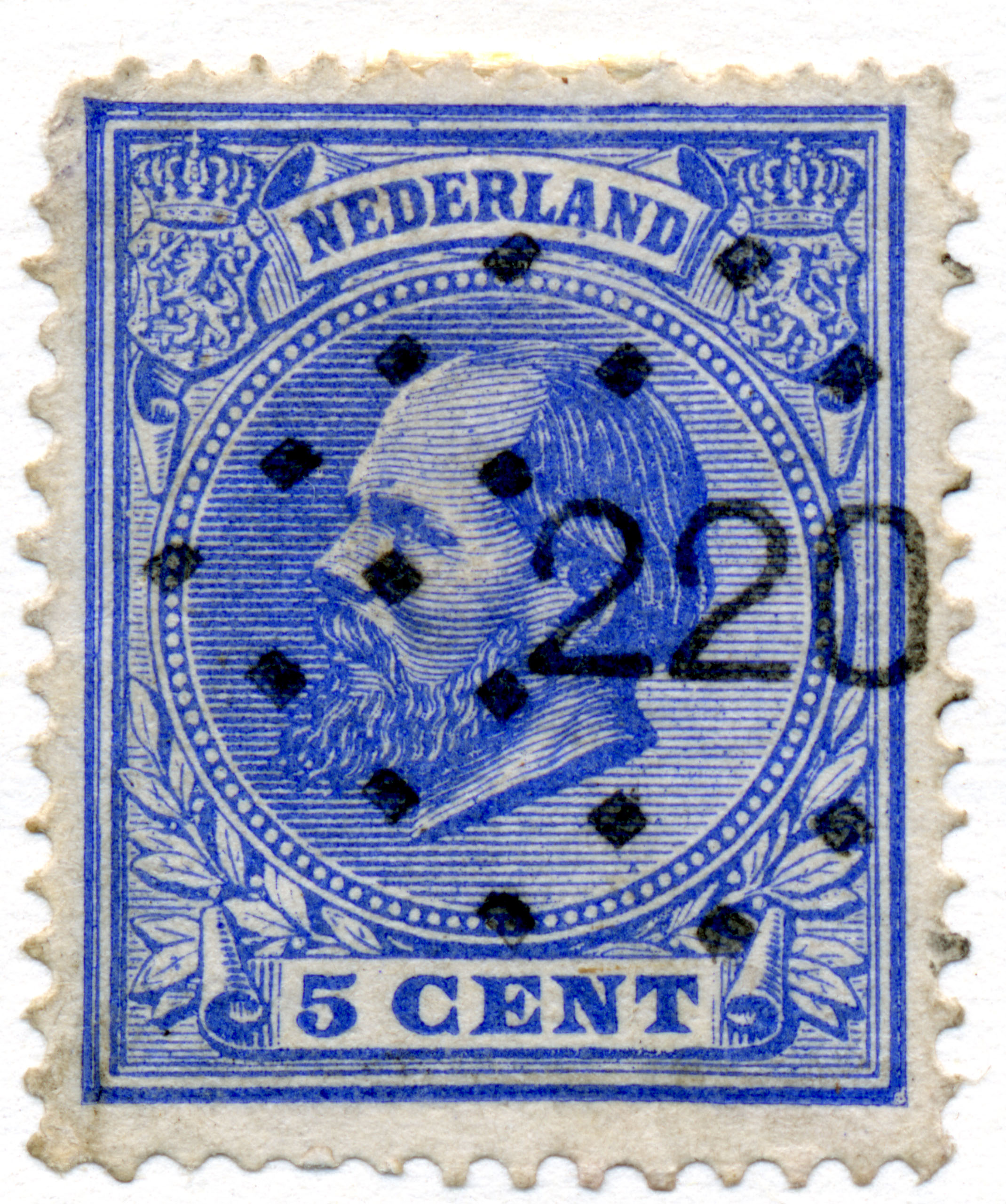
1872 stamp designed by Ten Kate

His career started in 1837. Some of Ten Kate's paintings, which were very popular with the public, depicted interior scenes of guard rooms with Spanish or Dutch soldiers in uniform. His colouring was rich, and his brushwork was careful. Ten of Kate's paintings were exhibited in museums in The Hague (1867, 1869), Belgium, Germany, Italy, France (1840–1841), Amsterdam (1868), and Haarlem. He was Director of The Academy of Arts (1860s). During wartime, there was a decline in the sale of his military-themed artwork, so he shifted his emphasis to landscape paintings. His artwork titled Un counseil deguerre sold in June 1870, but his next painting sold in February 1872.

== Personal life ==
His son, Herman F.C. ten Kate, the younger, was an anthropologist who co-authored a paper on the skulls of decapitated criminals. His younger brother, Mari ten Kate (1831–1910), also an artist, was more influenced by the Romanticists and more accessible in handling. Ten Kate died in 1891.

== Gallery ==
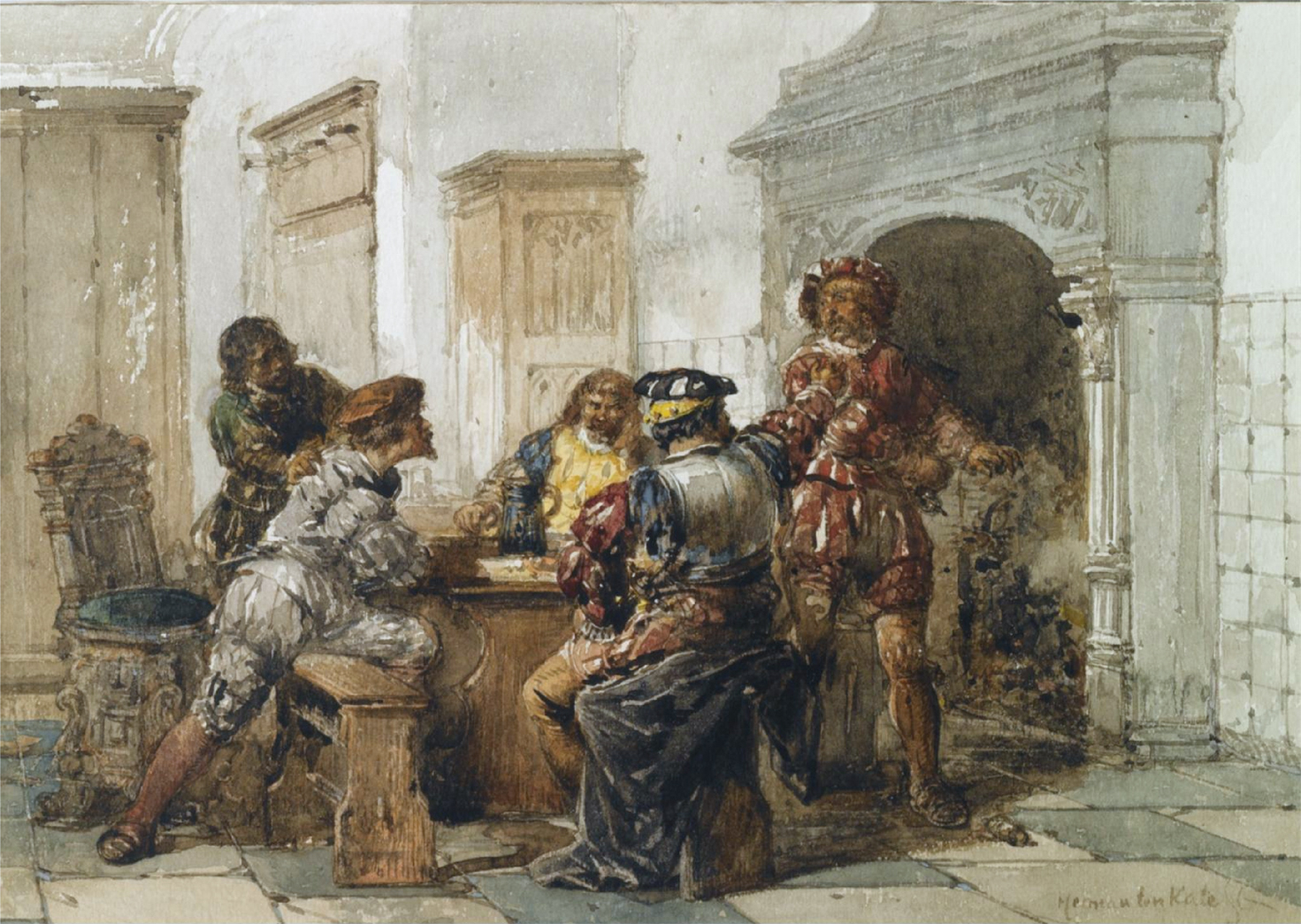
The Dispute, watercolour

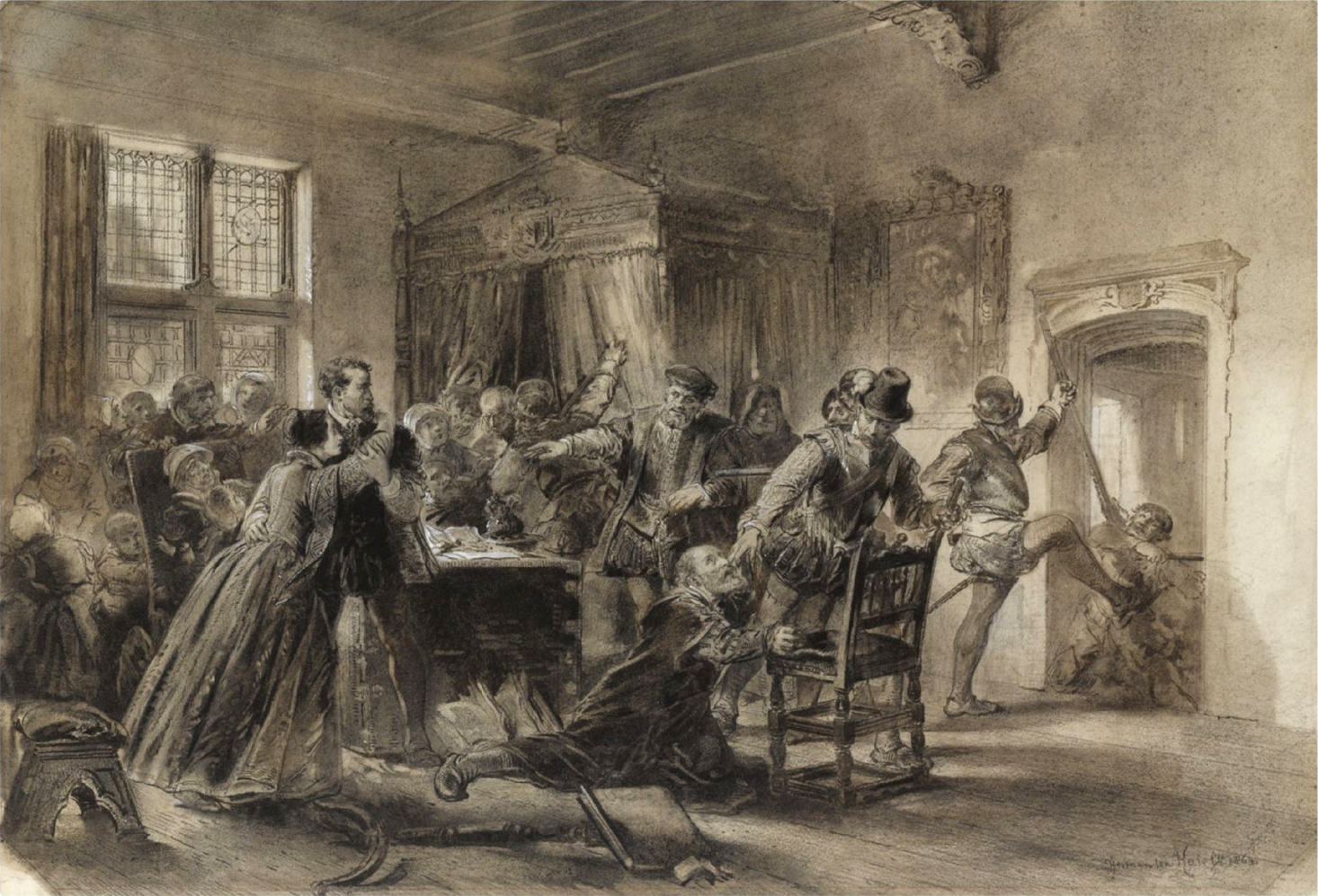
The Pillage, 1869, watercolour
