= SS Kate =

Carvel screw steamer

History

Australia
- Name: Kate
- Owner: Richard Manning (1884 - 1887) Government of New South Wales (1887 - 1914)
- Operator: Mercantile Explosives Department (1887 - 1914)
- Port of registry: (United Kingdom) Sydney (Pre Federation of Australia); (Australia) Sydney (1901–1914)
- Builder: Allen & Ward Longnose Point, Balmain, New South Wales, Australia
- Launched: 6 December 1883
- Identification: Sydney registration number: 21/1884 Ship official number: 89238
- Fate: Sunk in collision 2 April 1914

General characteristics
- Type: Wood carvel screw steamer
- Tonnage: 35.87 GRT; 24.39 NRT
- Length: 70.3 ft (21.43 m)
- Beam: 15.8 ft (4.82 m)
- Draught: 6.5 ft (1.98 m)
- Installed power: Surface Condensing Compound Engine Cylinder diameters 9 in (22.9 cm) 17 in (43.2 cm), Stroke 14 in (35.6 cm) 20 hp
- Propulsion: Screw

SS Kate was a wooden carvel screw steamer built in 1883 at Balmain that was twice struck and sunk by Port Jackson & Manly Steamship Company ferries.

== Description and construction ==
Kate was a wooden framed, wooden carvel planked vessel, and was built at Long Nose Point, Balmain In 1883. The vessel was built at the Allen & Ward shipyard and launched on 6 December 1883 and registered in Sydney to Richard Manning on 15 February 1884.

The vessel was a wooden single deck and the bridge ship with 2 masts fitted as a fore and aft Schooner and an elliptical stern it dimensions were:

Length from foredeck of stem to stern post was 70.3 ft (21.43 m)
Main Breadth to outside plank 15.8 ft (4.82 m)
Depth of Hold from tonnage deck to ceiling at amidships 6.5 ft (1.98 m)
Length of Engine Room 20.4 feet (6.22 m)

The vessel had a 35.87 gross register tons (GRT) and a 24.39 net register tons (NRT) when first manufactured and was fitted with a Robertson of London surface condensing compound steam engine, with cylinder diameters of 9 in (22.9 cm) and 17 in (43.2 cm)and had a stroke length of 14 in (35.6 cm) producing 20 hp (14.9 kW)

== Ship service history ==
=== Early career with Richard Manning 1884 - 1887 ===
The early years of the Kate was mainly spent as a tug bringing in vessels such as the South Sea's Island trader Avoca, the barque Freetrader, the 3 masts ship Dunfillan, the schooner Pioneer and the American barque Nona Lutum into Sydney Harbour and to their anchorage.

In May 1884 just 3 months after its registration the Kate was put forward to the Colonial Treasurer in a tender for the "supplying and maintaining an efficient steam tug for use at the Cape Hawke River". Mr. F. Buckle submitted the tender describing the Kate as a steam tug of 25 hp and asked for a subsidy of £600 per annum a £250 per annum greater than the steam tug Forster which also entered the tender and hence the Kate stayed in Sydney Harbour

Over the summer months the vessel was also used for Harbour cruises in February 1885 following the Kirby-Moore Trophy sculling race whilst in October 1886

Capt. Mat. Byrne's Sunday excursions to Watsons Bay and Middle Harbour are now in full swing, the favourite steamer Kate being employed on the service.

and during January 1887 the Kate was used by

a number of gentlemen gave Captain Crombie, of the four-masted ship Port Jackson, and Captain Young, of the ship Gretna, a complimentary picnic down tho harbour. The steamer Kate was engaged for the occasion, and a most enjoyable day was spent, the vessel travelling round to many of the most attractive spots about the harbour. During the afternoon both guests were the recipients of diamond lockets, and their health's wore drunk in bumpers of champagne

On 16 July 1886, the 60-ton steam tug Prince of Wales, while going alongside the Peterborough 12 miles off Botany Bay, the tug's wheel chains jammed, and was unable to avoid the Peterborough which struck her sinking the tug. Two of the Prince of Wales crew found themselves able to climb on board the Peterborough at the moment of the catastrophe, whilst the steamer Kate, which had by this time come up and searched for the two others, who were missing with the assistance of the Kate's lifeboat. The Peterborough was later taken in tow by the tug Kate and brought into Sydney Harbour

=== Later career with the Mercantile Explosives Department 1887 - 1914 ===
On 4 February 1887 at 3:15pm Richard Manning sold his 64/64 shares in the vessel to the colonial government of NSW and the vessel was placed into service with the NSW Mercantile Explosives Department

The Mercantile Explosives Department was formed within the Treasury Department to manage the mercantile explosives formerly the responsibility of the Ordnance Storekeeper. This was eventually to evolve, in 1902, into the Explosives Department. In 1922 this department transferred to the Department of Mines. It managed the explosives hulks in Middle Harbour, and later the Bantry Bay magazines.

==== Captain Bellett February 1887 - October 1902 ====
Captain Henry Denham Bellett was a veteran pioneer of Sydney Harbour Ferry Service and was then appointed to the Mercantile Explosives Department, firstly as the master of the steamer Sea Breeze, and then to the Kate. He remained master of the Kate for 17 years until he entered upon his retirement in October 1901

In October 1888 Captain Bellett saw the body of Henry Meyer floating in the water near Milsons Point who was a 50 years of age a native of Germany, and a butcher by occupation who had been drinking to excess lately, and appeared to be depressed in spirits whose dead body was found floating face downward

From early 1891 to late 1895 the Kate made monthly trips to Barrenjoey towing powder barges

In early January 1891 the officers of the Colonial Secretary's Department held their annual picnic on board the steamer Kate they steamed to various noted spots in the harbour, and eventually lunched at Fig Tree Point.

In August 1891 Thomas Crawley (Jr.) was appointed to be engine driver of the steam launch Kate on the death of his father Thomas Crawley (Snr.)

In April 1895 the launch Marvel left for Sydney from Barrenjoey and sank. The Government steamer Kate's crew witnessed the foundering, but seeing that the crew were rescued by the ketch Theresa, the steamer kept on her course.

===== 1898 Collision and sinking with the Manly Ferry Narrabeen (I) =====
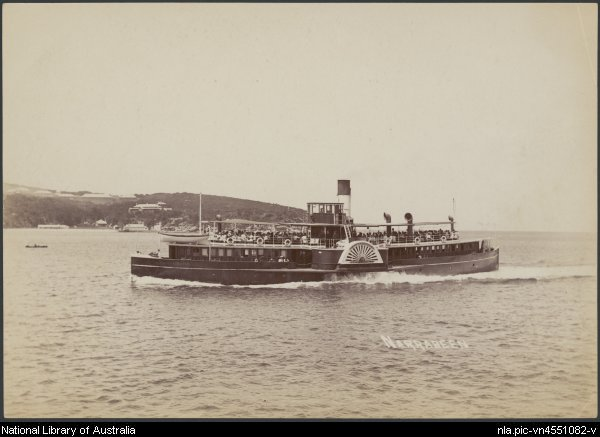
the Paddle Wheel Manly Ferry Narrabeen which sunk the SS Kate

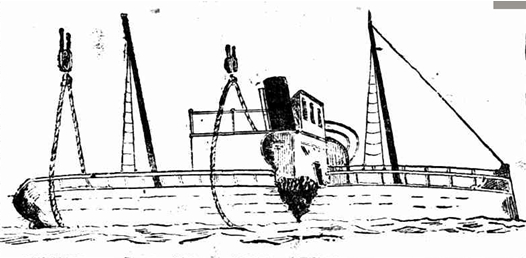
Raising of the SS Kate after its collision with the Paddle Wheel Manly Ferry Narrabeen

On 22 August 1898, the ferry Narrabeen left Manly at 07:15 and ran into a dense bank of foe shortly after leaving, and had to slow down and proceed cautiously up the harbour. After leaving the lightship nothing was seen till the lookout called 'full speed- astern,' and then was seen the stone wall of Garden Island a few yards ahead. Speed had just been got on the boat again after backing out, when the cry again came to go astern. This time it was too late, as there was seen coming around the corner of the island the Government steamer Kate towing a powder lighter bound for Broken Bay. The Narrabeen struck the Kate just forward of amidships, tearing a large hole in the woodwork. The engines of both steamers were going astern. The captain and crew, of the Kate scrambled aboard the Narrabeen with the Kate soon disappearing stern first.

The Powder Lighter Me Mel was being towed, with four men on board, after the collision, let go the tow rope, and was within an ace of going ashore on the island.

The Kate sank in about 8 fathoms (14.63 m), of water, and is not in the main fairway between Garden Island, and Fort Denison or Pinchgut about 100 ft (30.48 m) to the east ward of the No. 6. naval buoy, which is just inside the point of Garden Island.

The Kate was then raised later that week by Messrs. Sheehy and Sons and towed it to near Farm Cove to be patched before being put on a slip At the time of the collision, the Kate was estimated to be worth about £1500.

The subsequent Marine Board inquiry into the circumstances surrounding the collision found that the collision was due to the dense fog, which prevailed at the time, and to the fault of James Drewette, the master of the Narrabeen

===== Continued Service after Re floating =====
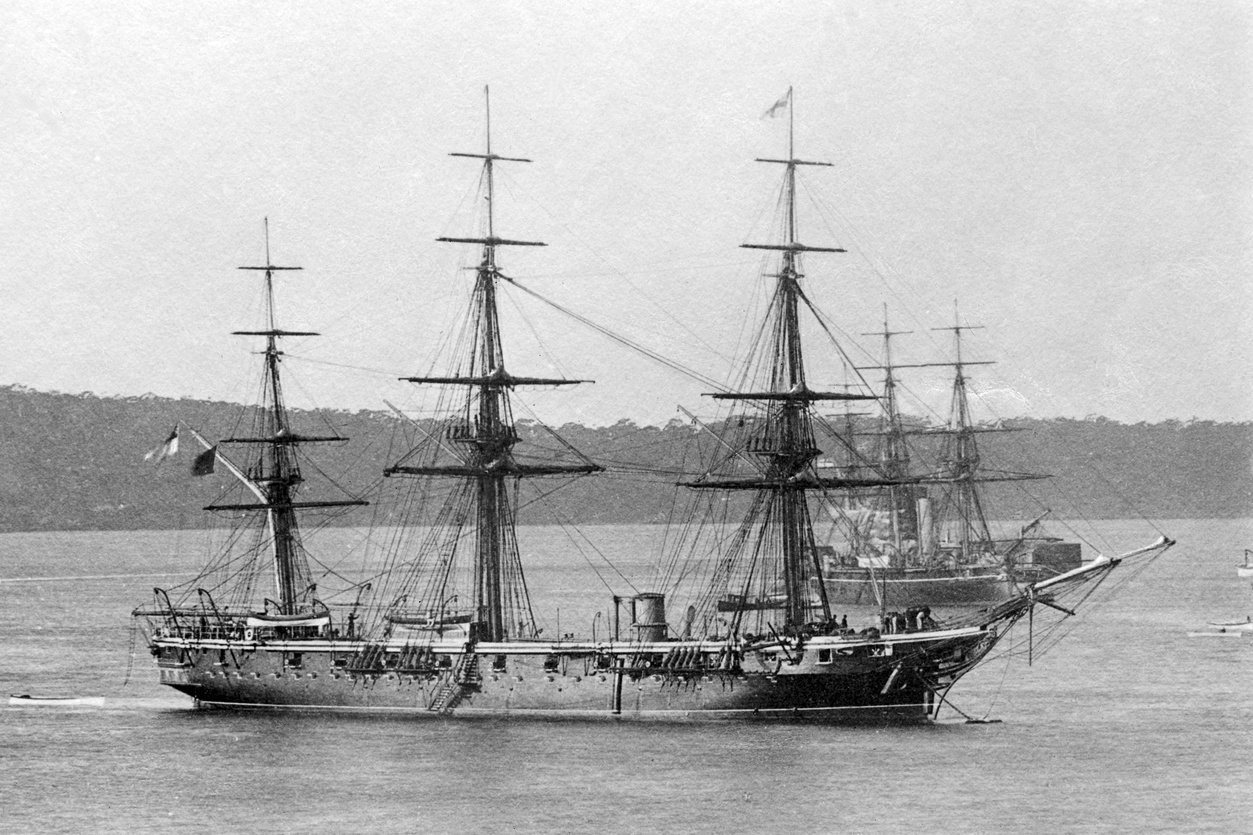
HMS Wolverine at around the time that SS Kate was used as a powder boat in training exercises

In April 1889 the Kate assisted with the New South Wales Naval Brigade in training exercises (as a powder boat) for HMS Wolverine, which had been formed in 1863 and consisted of five companies, four of which were in Sydney and with an overall strength of 200 men.

A year later in August 1899 the Kate was again assisting the four Sydney based Companies of the Naval Brigade Naval Artillery Volunteers, when they rowed a race in whalers over the harbour for £10 in prizes subscribed by the officers of the corps. A Company was allowed 45 seconds start, and rowing well were never caught, winning by over a length from B Company, which had 10 seconds start C Company was scratch, and D Company had 30 seconds allowance the steamer Kate and launch Gladys followed the race, which caused considerable intend A very fine crew was out for practice from the IS Naval Brigade It is reported this crew will shortly tackle the men-of warsmen in a whalers race for a fairly large stakes

On 14 August 1901, acting master of the Kate, William John Weldon, went alongside the ship Wray Castle in Watson's Bay and asked the master of the ship, Thomas Doran, if he had any explosives aboard. Doran said, 'Only safety cartridges and fuses'. The acting master of the Kate asked again, 'Are not the fuses electric detonators?' and Doran replied, 'They are only fuses'. Weldon again hailed the captain, and told him to get cases up for examination and ten cases were taken out. They contained electric detonators, and were passed into the powder boat. Captain Doran was informed of a bench for having ten cases containing detonators on the ship while it was in Port Jackson, and to the westward of Garden Island, contrary to the provisions of the Gunpowder and Explosives Consolidation Act of 1876. Doran was given a fine of £2 and 6s 6d costs ofcourt was imposed

==== Captain Jeremiah Collins November 1902 - April 1914 ====
On 12 March 1906 the brothers, William Edward and Peter Henry Dessaix were anchored off Pine Point in Middle Harbour, at about 7.15 a.m. in the skiff Toreador they saw the steam launch Kate, with a powder barge in tow, coming from the powder hulks in the direction of the open harbour. The launch got within two or three lengths of the skiff, and as the brothers Dessaix saw that she was not altering her course, Peter Dessaix called out, 'Look out! Alter your course, or we will be run down.' At this time, so the brothers say, there was no one at the wheel of the Kate. Again and again Peter yelled out, and then someone rushed to the wheel, and attempted to alter the course

The Kate, almost immediately struck the skiff on the bow, and the powder barge coming along also hit the boat. The brother went overboard, and the collision bloke the bow of the boat, which half-filled

During the marine court of inquiry into the collision with the skiff Toreador shortly after the evidence had been opened a point arose as to whether the Court had jurisdiction to hold tho inquiry as "nothing in this Act shall apply to any ship belonging to or in the service of the crown" and the Kate was a ship within the meaning of that section and additionally as the Toreador was a skiff and was propelled by oars it was not a ship within the meaning of the Act causing the inquiry to close

The Explosives Department budget for 1 July 1910, to 30 June 1911 also show that Captain Collins wage increased from £168 to £174 per annum

On 25 May 1911 there were a hundred or so of passengers on board the tourist steamer Kookaburra owned by Sydney ferries late in the afternoon when the vessel was between the Bluff and Green Point Middle Harbour in close proximity to the powder hulks. The passengers became aware that something was wrong, it became known that a fire had broken out just over the boiler. In a short space of time many small boats were around the Kookaburra the steam launch Kate moored close by was the first to make fast alongside and the crew of the Kate to assist in extinguishing the flames.

== Collision and sinking ==
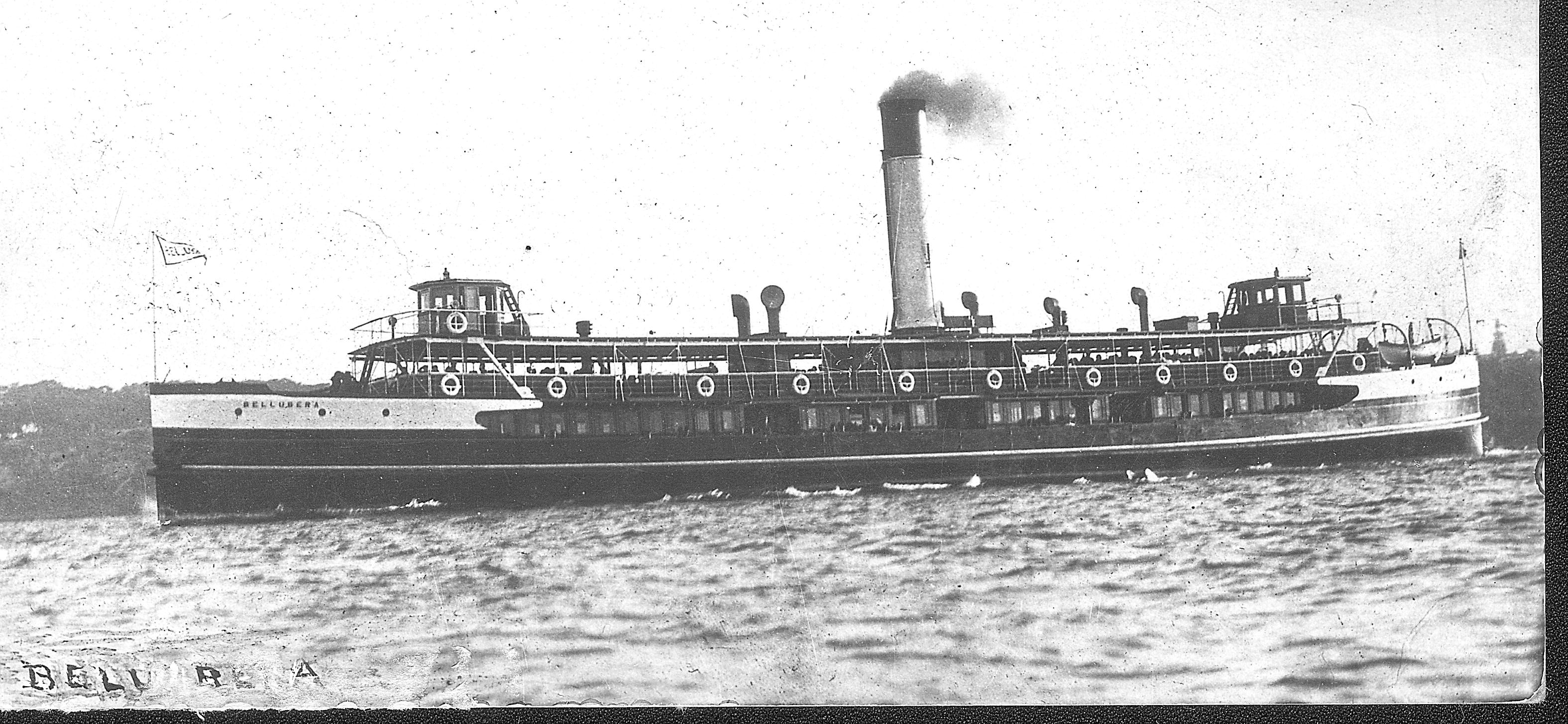
The Manly ferry Bellubera which struck and sunk the SS Kate off Dobroyd Head

On 2 April 1914, the Kate after having left middle harbour and had then taken a lighter to Manly earlier in the morning, and had landed at the Manly cargo wharf. The tug then left and was towing the lighter up the harbour to Woolloomooloo Bay, when just past Dobroyd Head the master of the Kate saw a half-sunken boat out to seaward of him, some 200 yards (182.88 m) away. Thinking there might be someone in her, he "starboarded" the helm to go over, and after swinging about four points to port, straightened up, and then saw the ferry Bellubera forward of his port beam, 150 yards (137.16 m) or 200 yards (182.88 m) yards away, and coming straight for him.

The ferry had left Manly at 07:45, and when off Dobroyd she approached the Kate, which was towing a small lighter from the hulks in Middle Harbour. The Bellubera was overtaking the Kate, and when just about up to Dobroyd, heading south by west, a little out of its usual course, the Kate was on his starboard bow, some 200 feet (60.96 m) ahead, and 400 feet (121.92 m) to the eastward. Suddenly the Kate "starboarded" across the bow of the Bellubera, which was going at about 12 knots. In a few moments the Kate was almost under the ferry boat's bow. The Bellubera's engines were put full astern, and 20 seconds later the collision occurred. The Kate was heading about due east, and the Belluberain the same direction as when she left.

The Bellubera struck the tug almost amidships, and cut right into her. The captain Bellubera saw that the tug was sinking, and immediately ordered the Bellubera's lifeboat to be launched to pick up the occupants of the tug. Lifebuoys were also thrown to the men, two of whom had scrambled onto the bottom of the lighter, which had been capsized by the collision. the members of the Kate's crew, consisted of Captain J. Collins, Thomas Crawley Jnr.(engineer), A. Webb (deckhand), and H. Arnemann (steersman on the lighter).

The Bellubera was very little the worse for the bump, and, apart from having some paint scratched off, did not suffer any serious damage. On her arrival at the Quay, however, she still bore traces of the collision, as pieces of wreckage from the sunken tug were hanging from her belting for a distance of about 20 feet (6.10 m). A piece of copper piping, apparently from some part of tho tug's boilers, was found twisted and jammed In between the rudder and the vessel. This was removed, and the Bellubera again took up her running after having missed only one trip.

At the marine court it was found that the collision was caused by the master of the Kate in altering his course to investigate the sunken boat. It was held, however, that the Court had no jurisdiction to deal with a Government vessel; but it was added that it was questionable whether, under the circumstances, even if it had the power, it would penalise tho master In any way, as he was obviously acting with the very best intentions
