= Crabbit Old Woman =

Poem by Phyllis McCormack

Crabbit
- by Phyllis McCormack
- Written: 1966
- Country: Scotland
- Language: English
- Publisher: Nursing Mirror
- Publication date: December 1972

"Crabbit ", also variously titled "Look Closer", "Look Closer Nurse", "Kate", "Open Your Eyes" or "What Do You See?", is a poem written in 1966 by Phyllis McCormack, then working as a nurse in Sunnyside Hospital, Montrose. The poem is written in the voice of an old woman in a nursing home who is reflecting upon her life. Crabbit is Scots for "bad-tempered" or "grumpy".

The poem appeared in the Nursing Mirror in December 1972 without attribution. Phyllis McCormack explained in a letter to the journal that she wrote the poem in 1966 for her hospital newsletter.

This story was corroborated by an article from the Daily Mail on 12 March 1998, where Phyllis McCormack's son wrote that his mother composed it in the 1960s, when she submitted it anonymously with the title "Look Closer Nurse" to a small magazine intended just for Sunnyside.

The next year, the poem was published in Chris Searle's poetry anthology Elders (Reality Press, 1973), without title or attribution. Subsequently, a wealth of urban legend has sprung up surrounding this humble work. Most of the legend associated with this poem attributes it to a senile elderly woman in a Dundee nursing home (or sometimes an Irish nursing home), where a nurse found it while packing her belongings following her death. Searle himself was quoted in 1998 as saying of the poem's authorship: "I don't think we'll ever know. I accepted it as authentic." (i.e. as the authentic writing of an infirm old woman).

The poem, which paints a rather sad picture of a decrepit woman's final days in care, has been quoted in various works written for and about the caring professions in order to highlight the importance of maintaining the dignity of the lives of elderly patients. It is also included in the Edexcel IGCSE English Literature poetry anthology.

Several variants exist including, "A Nurse's Reply" and "Cranky Old Man".

== Notes ==
The poem can be seen in the background in the Magnetic Scrolls logo.
