= Nolan (surname) =

Nolan is a surname, of Irish origin from Ó Nualláin, derived from Irish nuall meaning "famous or noble" combined with a diminutive suffix. According to historian C. Thomas Cairney, the O'Nolans in Ireland were one of the chiefly families of the Loígis tribe who in turn came from the Cruthin tribe who were the first Celts to settle in Ireland from between 800 and 500 BC.

== People with the surname "Nolan" include ==
=== A ===
- Adam Nolan (born 1987), Irish boxer
- Aidan Nolan (born 1993), Irish hurler
- Alan Nolan (disambiguation), multiple people
- Albert Nolan (1934–2022), South African priest
- Alex Nolan (born 2003), Irish footballer
- Andrea Nolan, Irish veterinarian
- Anna Nolan (born 1970), Irish television presenter
- Anne Nolan (born 1950), Irish singer
- Anthony Nolan (politician), American politician

=== B ===
- Barry Nolan (born 1947), American television presenter
- Ben Nolan (born 1983), English cricketer
- Bernie Nolan (1960–2013), Irish entertainer and actress
- Bernie Nolan (footballer) (1883–1978), Australian rules footballer
- Beth Nolan (born 1951), American lawyer and academic administrator
- Bill Nolan (disambiguation), multiple people
- Bob Nolan (1908–1980), Canadian singer-songwriter
- Brandon Nolan (born 1983), Canadian ice hockey player
- Brian Nolan (1932–2006), Canadian journalist and author

=== C ===
- Carol Nolan (born 1978), Irish politician
- Cathal J. Nolan (born 1956), American historian
- Catherine Nolan (1958–2026), American politician
- Chance Nolan (born 1999), American football player
- Charles Nolan (1957–2011), American fashion designer
- Christina E. Nolan (born 1979), American lawyer
- Christopher Nolan (disambiguation), multiple people
- Clarrie Nolan (1904–1998), Australian rules footballer
- Clive Nolan (born 1961), British musician and producer
- Col Nolan (1938–2019), Australian musician
- Coleen Nolan (born 1965), English television presenter
- Conan Nolan, American journalist
- Cynthia Reed Nolan (1908–1976), Australian writer

=== D ===
- Daire Nolan (born 1968), Irish dancer
- Danny Sue Nolan (1923–2002), American actress
- David Nolan (disambiguation), multiple people
- Deanna Nolan (born 1979), American basketball player
- Deborah A. Nolan, American statistician
- Denise Nolan (born 1952), Irish singer
- Dennis Nolan (disambiguation), multiple people
- Derek Nolan (born 1982), Irish politician
- Dick Nolan (disambiguation), multiple people
- Doris Nolan (1916–1998), American actress
- Doug Nolan (born 1976), American ice hockey player

=== E ===
- Earl Nolan (1911–1991), American football player
- Eda Nolan (born 1988), Filipino actress
- Eddie Nolan (born 1988), Irish footballer
- Edward Nolan (disambiguation), multiple people
- Eileen Nolan (1920–2005), English army officer
- Elaine Nolan (born 1981), Irish cricketer
- Elizabeth Nolan (born 1978), American chemist
- Emmet Nolan (born 1995), Irish hurler
- Errol Nolan (born 1991), American sprinter
- Evin Nolan (1930–2016), Irish painter

=== F ===
- Faith Nolan (born 1957), Canadian musician
- Francis Nolan, British phonetician
- Frank Nolan (disambiguation), multiple people
- Frankie Nolan (born 1950), Irish sportsperson
- Frederick Nolan (disambiguation), multiple people

=== G ===
- Garett Nolan (born 1997), American model
- Garry Nolan, American immunologist
- Gary Nolan (disambiguation), multiple people
- Geoff Nolan (born 1937), English cricketer
- Gervais Nolan (1796–1857), French-Canadian fur trapper
- Graham Nolan (born 1962), American comic book artist

=== H ===
- Han Nolan (born 1956), American writer
- Hayley Nolan (born 1997), Irish footballer
- Henry Grattan Nolan (1893–1957), Canadian lawyer
- Herb Nolan (1875–1933), Australian rules footballer
- Howard Nolan (1865–1931), Australian minister
- Howard C. Nolan Jr. (1932–2023), American attorney

=== I ===
- Ian Nolan (born 1970), Northern Irish footballer
- Isabel Nolan (born 1974), Irish artist

=== J ===
- Jack Nolan (disambiguation), multiple people
- Jahmarie Nolan (born 2009), Jamaican footballer
- James Nolan (disambiguation), multiple people
- Janne E. Nolan (1951–2019), American academic
- Jeanette Nolan (1911–1998), American actress
- Jerry Nolan (1946–1992), American drummer
- Jerry Nolan (footballer) (1869–1947), Australian rules footballer
- Joe Nolan (born 1951), American baseball player
- Joe Nolan (ice hockey) (1929–1986), Canadian hockey player
- John Nolan (disambiguation), multiple people
- Johnny Nolan (1864–1907), English rugby union footballer
- Jon Nolan (born 1992), English footballer
- Jonathan Nolan (born 1976), British screenwriter
- Jordan Nolan (born 1989), Canadian hockey player
- Joseph Nolan (disambiguation), multiple people
- Julia Nolan (1611–1701), Irish noble

=== K ===
- Kathleen Nolan (born 1933), American actress
- Katie Nolan (born 1987), American television host
- Keith Nolan (disambiguation), multiple people
- Ken Nolan, American screenwriter
- Kenny Nolan (born 1949), American singer-songwriter
- Kevin Nolan (born 1982), English footballer
- Kevin Nolan (Gaelic footballer) (born 1988), Irish Gaelic footballer
- Kylie Nolan (born 1988), Welsh footballer

=== L ===
- Laura Nolan (born 1994), Irish dancer
- Leo Nolan (disambiguation), multiple people
- Liam Nolan (disambiguation), multiple people
- Linda Nolan (1959–2025), Irish singer
- Lloyd Nolan (1902–1985), American actor
- Lou Nolan (born 1945), American public address announcer
- Lou Nolan (artist) (1926–2008), American artist
- Louis Nolan (1818–1854), British soldier
- Louisa Nolan (1898–??), Irish humanitarian

=== M ===
- Mae Nolan (1886–1973), American politician
- Mandy Nolan (born 1967), Australian comedian
- Margaret Nolan (1943–2020), English visual artist
- Mark Edward Nolan (1901–1967), American lawyer and politician
- Martin Nolan (disambiguation), multiple people
- Mary Nolan (disambiguation), multiple people
- Matthew Nolan (disambiguation), multiple people
- Maureen Nolan (born 1954), Irish singer-songwriter
- Megan Nolan (born 1990), Irish journalist and writer
- Melanie Nolan (born 1960), New Zealand historian
- Michael Nolan (disambiguation), multiple people
- Mick Nolan (Gaelic footballer), Irish Gaelic footballer
- Mick Nolan (Australian footballer) (1949–2008), Australian rules footballer
- M. J. Nolan (born 1951), Irish politician
- Monica Nolan (1913–1995), American tennis player

=== N ===
- Nicholas M. Nolan (1835–1883), American soldier
- Norma Nolan (1938–2025), Argentine beauty queen

=== O ===
- Owen Nolan (born 1972), Canadian ice hockey player

=== P ===
- Paddy Nolan (1862–1913), Irish-Canadian lawyer
- Paddy Nolan (ice hockey) (1897–1957), Canadian hockey player
- Pádraig Nolan (born 1964), Irish sportsperson
- Pat Nolan (born 1950), American lawyer
- Patrick Nolan (disambiguation), multiple people
- Paul Nolan (disambiguation), multiple people
- Percy Nolan (1886–1954), Australian solicitor and politician
- Peter Nolan (born 1949), British academic
- Philip Nolan (disambiguation), multiple people
- Phillis Nolan (1946–2022), Irish lawn bowler
- P. J. Nolan (born 1987), Irish hurler

=== R ===
- Rachel Nolan (born 1974), Australian politician
- Riall Nolan (born 1943), American anthropologist
- Richard Nolan (disambiguation), multiple people
- Rick Nolan (1943–2024), American politician
- Rob Nolan (born 1985), Canadian hockey player
- Roger Nolan (born 1939), American police officer
- Ronnie Nolan (1933–2023), Irish footballer
- Rose Nolan (born 1959), Australian artist
- Ryan Nolan (born 1999), Irish footballer

=== S ===
- Sam Nolan (born 1930), Irish trade unionist
- Samuel Nolan (??–1997), American police officer
- Sara Susan Nolan (1843–1927), English activist
- Seán Nolan, Irish politician
- Sean Nolan (water polo) (born 1972), American water polo player
- Shane Nolan, Irish hurler
- Shirley Nolan (1942–2001), British teacher
- Sidney Nolan (1917–1992), Australian painter
- Sir Nolan (born 1990), American record producer
- Sofia Nolan, Australian actress
- Stephen Nolan (born 1973), Northern Irish radio presenter
- Stephen Nolan (hurler), Irish hurler
- Steve Nolan, Irish rugby league footballer
- Susan A. Nolan, American psychologist

=== T ===
- Tania Nolan (born 1983), New Zealand actress
- Ted Nolan (born 1958), Canadian ice hockey player and coach
- Thomas Nolan (disambiguation), multiple people
- Tia Nolan, American film editor
- Tim Nolan (disambiguation), multiple people
- Todd Nolan, Irish hurler
- Tom Nolan (disambiguation), multiple people
- Troy Nolan (born 1986), American football player

=== V ===
- Victoria Nolan, Canadian rower
- Vincent Nolan (1936–1980), Irish police officer

=== W ===
- William Nolan (disambiguation), multiple people
- Willie Nolan (1896–1939), Irish golfer

=== Y ===
- Yvette Nolan (born 1961), Canadian playwright
- Yvonne Nolan, British politician

== Fictional characters ==
- David Nolan, in the ABC series Once Upon a Time
  - Neal Nolan, David's son
- Emma Nolan, in the American TV series The Pitt
- John Nolan, in the American TV series The Rookie
- Lynsey Nolan, in the British TV series Hollyoaks

== See also ==
- Nolan (given name)
- Nolan (disambiguation)
- Senator Nolan (disambiguation)
- Colby Nolan, a housecat who was awarded an MBA degree in 2004 by Trinity Southern University, a Texas-based diploma mill
