= John Nolan =

John Nolan may refer to:

== Entertainment ==
- John Nolan (musician) (born 1978), American musician with Taking Back Sunday and Straylight Run
- Jonathan Nolan (born 1976), British-American writer and producer
- John Nolan (British actor) (1938–2026), British actor and the uncle of Jonathan
- John Nolan (American actor) (1933–2000), American actor
- John Nolan (dancer) (born 1990), Irish dancer and choreographer

== Politics ==
- John A. Nolan (1930–2004), broadcaster and politician in Newfoundland, Canada
- John Nolan (Irish politician) (died 1948), Irish Cumann na nGaedhael politician
- John I. Nolan (1874–1922), American politician from California
- John Philip Nolan (1838–1912), Irish landowner, army officer and politician

== Sports ==
- John Nolan (hurler) (born 1954), Irish hurler of the 1970s and 80s for Wexford
- John Nolan (1950s hurler), Irish hurler of the 1950s and 60s for Wexford, see List of All-Ireland Senior Hurling Championship medal winners
- John Nolan (guard) (1899–1973), offensive guard for the Los Angeles Buccaneers in 1926
- John Nolan (tackle) (1926–1996), American football tackle
- Jon Nolan (born 1992), English professional footballer

== Other ==
- John James Nolan (1888–1952), Irish physicist, President of the Royal Irish Academy, 1949–52
- John Gavin Nolan (1924–1999), Roman Catholic bishop
- John Nolan, an animatronics designer for the film Jurassic World Dominion
- John Nolan (The Rookie), the protagonist of the ABC comedy-drama The Rookie
- Johnny Nolan, a major character in Betty Smith's novel A Tree Grows in Brooklyn
