= Thomas Nolan =

Thomas or Tom Nolan may refer to:

== Politicians ==
- Tom Nolan (Irish politician) (1921–1992), Irish Fianna Fáil politician
- Thomas M. Nolan (1916–1989), Pennsylvania politician
- Thomas S. Nolan (1856–1944), American politician

== Sports ==
- Tom Nolan (Australian rules footballer) (1876–1930), Australian footballer
- Tom Nolan (footballer, born 1909) (1909–1969), English footballer
- Tom Nolan (hurler) (died 2007), Irish hurler
- Tom Nolan (fighter), (born 2000), Australian mixed martial artist

== Others ==
- Thomas Brennan Nolan (1901–1992), American geologist
- Tom Nolan (actor) (born 1948), Canadian-American actor
