= Michael Nolan =

Michael Nolan may refer to:

- Michael Nolan (MP) (died 1827), Irish barrister, judge, politician and legal author
- Michael Nolan, Baron Nolan (1928–2007), British retired judge
- Michael N. Nolan (1833–1905), American politician
- Michael J. Nolan (1856–1902), American printer and politician from New York
- Michael Nolan (psychologist) (1925–2009), Irish Catholic priest and psychologist
- Michael Nolan (writer) (born 1993), writer from Northern Ireland also known as Michael Magee
- Mick Nolan (Gaelic footballer), Gaelic football player
- Mick Nolan (Australian footballer) (1949–2008), Australian rules footballer for North Melbourne
- Mike Nolan (born 1959), American football coach with the San Francisco 49ers
- Mike Nolan (singer) (born 1954), Irish-born English vocalist with Bucks Fizz
- Mike Nolan, character in A Soul's Awakening
- Mike Nolan, character in The Big Lez Show
