= Todd Nolan =

Irish hurler

Sport
- Sport: Hurling
- Position: Forward
Club
- Years: Club
- 1960's-1980's: Crotta O'Neill's
Club titles
- Kerry titles: 1
Inter-county
- Years: County
- 1966-1986: Kerry
Inter-county titles
- Munster titles: 0
- All-Irelands: 0

Todd Nolan was a hurler from County Kerry, Ireland. He played with the Kerry intercounty team from 1966 to 1986, and with his local Crotta O'Neill's club. He also played football with Fingue.

While playing for Kerry, he won three All-Ireland Senior B Hurling Championship titles in 1976, 1983 and 1986.

He won a Railway Cup medal with Munster in 1969 alongside the great names of hurling like Len Gaynor, Eamonn Cregan and Jimmy Doyle to name a few.

At club level with Crotta O'Neill's he won a Kerry Senior Hurling Championship medal in 1968. He also played in 5 other finals.

His father Tom Nolan was also a great hurling during the 1940s till the 1960s. He had 4 other brothers who also played with Kerry.

After his death the Munster Council named a hurling tournament in his name that is played every year at minor level in Kerry.
