= Joseph Nolan =

Joseph Nolan may refer to:

- Joseph Nolan (politician) (c. 1846–1928), Irish nationalist politician
- Joseph Nolan (organist) (born 1974), English-born Australian organist and conductor.
- Joseph A. Nolan (1857–1921), United States Army soldier and Medal of Honor recipient
- Joseph R. Nolan (1925–2013), American jurist
- Joe Nolan (born 1951), American baseball player
- Joe Nolan (ice hockey) (1929–1986), ice hockey player
