= Senator Noland =

Senator Noland may refer to:

- Duane Noland (born 1956), Illinois State Senate
- Michael Noland (born 1960), Illinois State Senate
- Patricia Noland (born 1945), Arizona State Senate

== See also ==
- Senator Nolan (disambiguation)
