= Manly Art Gallery and Museum =

Museum in New South Wales, Australia

- Established: 1930
- Location: West Esplanade Manly, New South Wales
- Coordinates: 33.7985°S 151.2814°E
- Director: Josephine Bennett
- Website: MAGAM

The Manly Art Gallery and Museum (MAGAM), located in Manly, New South Wales, Australia, was the first metropolitan-based regional gallery in New South Wales and holds an extensive collection of Australian ceramics and 130 works by Antonio Dattilo Rubbo. Since 1982, MAGAM has also been a museum of beach culture and the history of Manly and the Northern Beaches. The permanent collection numbers over 6,000 objects in a range of media including paintings, works on paper, ceramics and museum objects, documents and photographs.

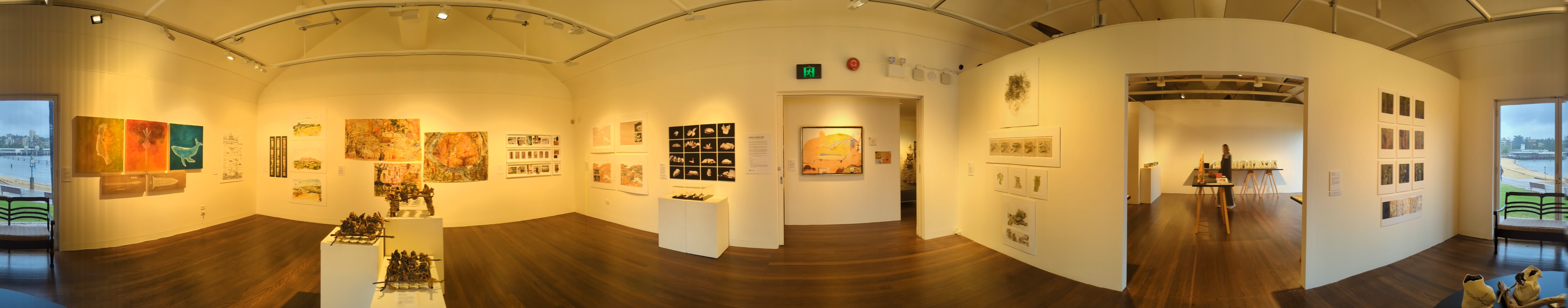
Panoramic view in one room of the gallery

== History ==
Manly Art Gallery and Museum is the oldest metropolitan purpose-built regional gallery in NSW having been established on its present site in West Esplanade in 1930. The first committee of the Manly Art Gallery was appointed in 1924 and included Antonio Dattilo-Rubbo, Percy Nolan, Charles Bryant, Herbert Marriner, Hermon Slade, Henry Forsyth and Percy Gledhill and the collection was initially housed in the Town Hall. The present building was formerly an outdoor concert pavilion opened in 1922 and its adaptive re-use was made possible with the closure of the proscenium arch. The Newly adapted building was opened by the Chief Justice of New South Wales Sir Phillip Street. At the time of the building opening the collection already housed 200 exhibits including 79 paintings and 62 historical photographs. In March 1939, Antonio Dattilo Rubbo presented 100 works to the young gallery including his own paintings, works on paper, watercolours and etchings. This donation included works by W. Lister Lister, Harold Septimus Power, John Seymour Lucas and Grace Cossington Smith. An annex to house this collection was opened in 1940, and is known as the Dattilo-Rubbo Room, and on his death he bequeathed more of his paintings and £500 to the gallery. P S Garling donated 55 paintings in 1947, including works by George Washington Lambert and William Piguenit. In 1966, during the chairmanship of Keith Jones, the gallery was extended with an additional gallery, a storeroom, a new ceiling, a new entrance through the Rubbo annexe and improved lighting. Many works were acquired for the gallery through the Manly Art Prize (1962–1984). In 1968 Clarice Thomas held the first ceramic exhibition and a major bequest by Lady Askin in 1984 has made the ongoing display of these works possible. In 1981, Clarice Thomas was appointed full-time Director of the gallery after acting as Honorary Director for some fourteen years and a grant was received from the NSW Ministry for the Arts contributing towards the cost of building a museum to adjoin the gallery. These additions and renovations provided a new entrance and reception and the Dattillo Rubbo Room was doubled in size. After reopening in 1982 the name became Manly Art Gallery & Museum.

== Directors ==
- Clarice Thomas 1981–1982 (gallery)
- Warren Wickman 1982 (museum)
- Peter Timms (1983–1986) (joint gallery & museum director since 1983)
- Michael Pursche (1987–1998)
- Therese Kenyon (1999–2011)
- Jackie Dunn (2011–2013)
- Michael Hedger (2013-2022)
- Josephine Bennett (appointed 2022)

== Collection ==
The collection includes contemporary and early Australian and contains over 1,000 watercolours, prints, etchings, drawings and paintings. There are also some international artists in the collection. Many works were donated by artists including Margaret Preston, Thea Proctor, Will Ashton and Lloyd Rees. In 1930, Colonel Alfred Spain presented Tom Roberts’s 1899 work The Flower Sellers to the collection. Since 1945 MAGAM has been collecting ceramics through an active acquisitions program and by donation and now has approximately 350 works. They are displayed on rotation in the Lady Askin Ceramics Room, including works by Peter Rushforth, Ivan Englund, Janet Mansfield and Gwyn Hanssen Piggott. Over 1300 items of swimwear are held in the collection representing changes in fabric technology, fashion and social attitudes.
