= Frank Nolan =

Frank Nolan may refer to:

- Frank Nolan (cricketer) (1920–2009), Australian cricketer
- Frank Nolan (footballer) (1915–1989), Australian rules footballer

== See also ==
- Frankie Nolan (born 1950), Irish sportsperson
