= James Nolan =

James, Jimmy or Jim Nolan may refer to:

== People ==
- James Nolan (athlete) (born 1977), Irish athlete and athletics coach
- James Nolan (author) (born 1947), American poet and writer of fiction
- James Thomas Nolan (1926–2018), American actor known professionally as James Greene
- James Nolan (actor) (1915–1985), American actor
- James Nolan (footballer) (born 2005), English footballer
- James Nolan Jr. (1918–2004), news announcer and host of Uncle Jimmy's Clubhouse
- James Nolan (criminal) (died 2010), Irish criminal whose brother confessed to killing him
- James Nolan (politician) (1901–1991), American politician from Alaska
- James Findley Nolan (1915–1983), American obstetrician and gynecologist associated with the Manhattan Project.
- Jim Nolan (basketball) (1927–1983), American National Basketball Association player
- Jim Nolan (theatre director) (born 1958), Irish theatre director
- Jim Nolan (biker) (born 1943), American outlaw biker
- Jimmy Nolan (1893–1973), Australian footballer

== Fictional characters ==
- Jim Nolan, in John Steinbeck's novel In Dubious Battle

== See also ==
- Jimmy Nolen (1934–1983), American guitarist
