= North Head Quarantine Station =

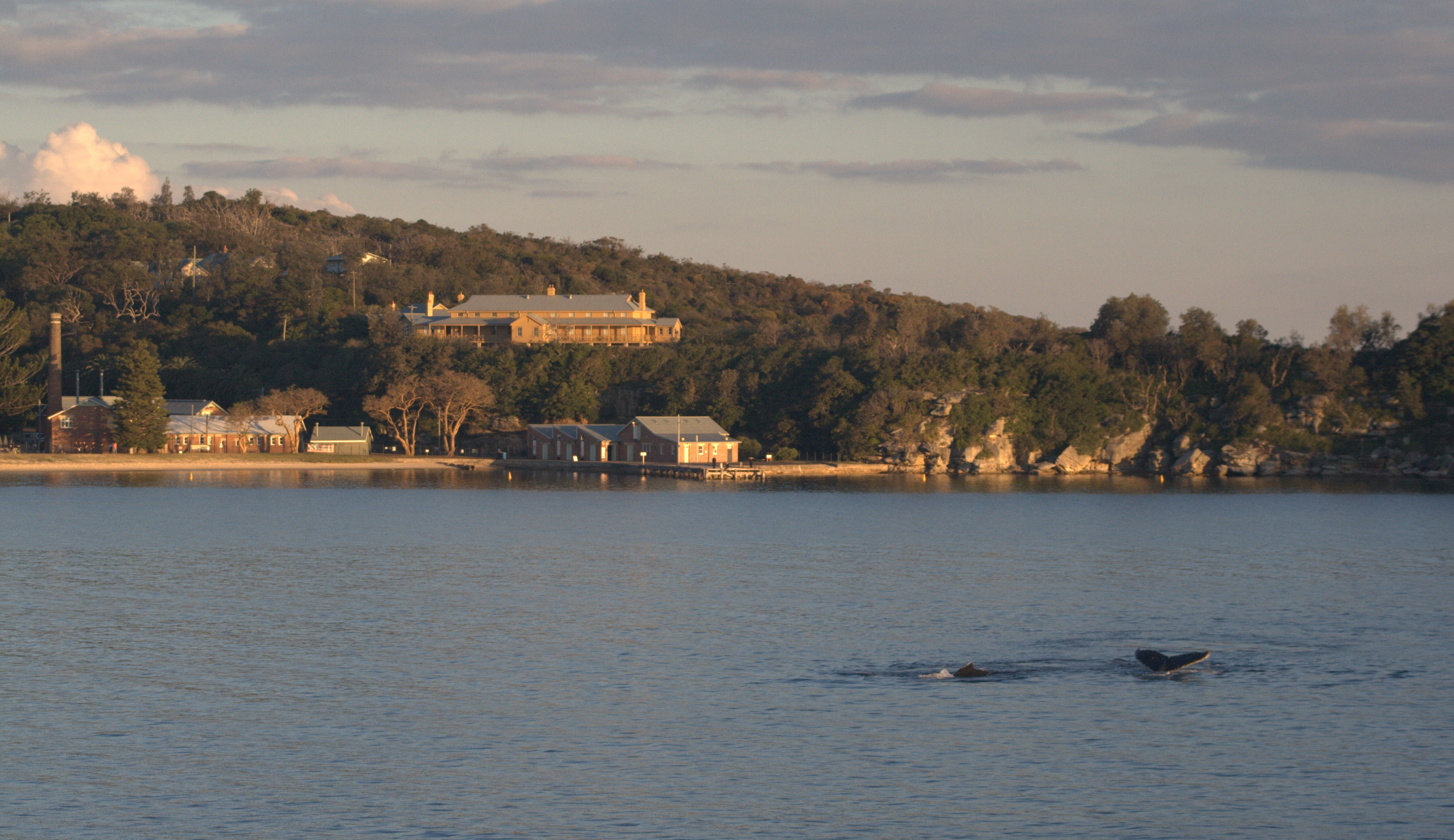
- The hospital, boiler house and wharf at the Quarantine Station, with humpback whales passing by

- Location within east Sydney
- 33°48′58″S 151°17′20″E
- Location: North Head Scenic Drive, Manly, New South Wales, Australia

Site notes
- Area: 277 hectares (680 acres) (entire North Head site)
- Owner: Office of Environment & Heritage

Australian National Heritage List
- Official name: North Head - Sydney, North Head Scenic Dr, Manly, NSW, Australia
- Type: Historic
- Designated: 12 May 2006
- Reference no.: 105759

New South Wales Heritage Register
- Official name: North Head Quarantine Station & Reserve; Quarantine Station & Reserve
- Type: State heritage (landscape)
- Designated: 2 April 1999
- Reference no.: 1003
- Type: Historic Landscape
- Category: Landscape - Cultural

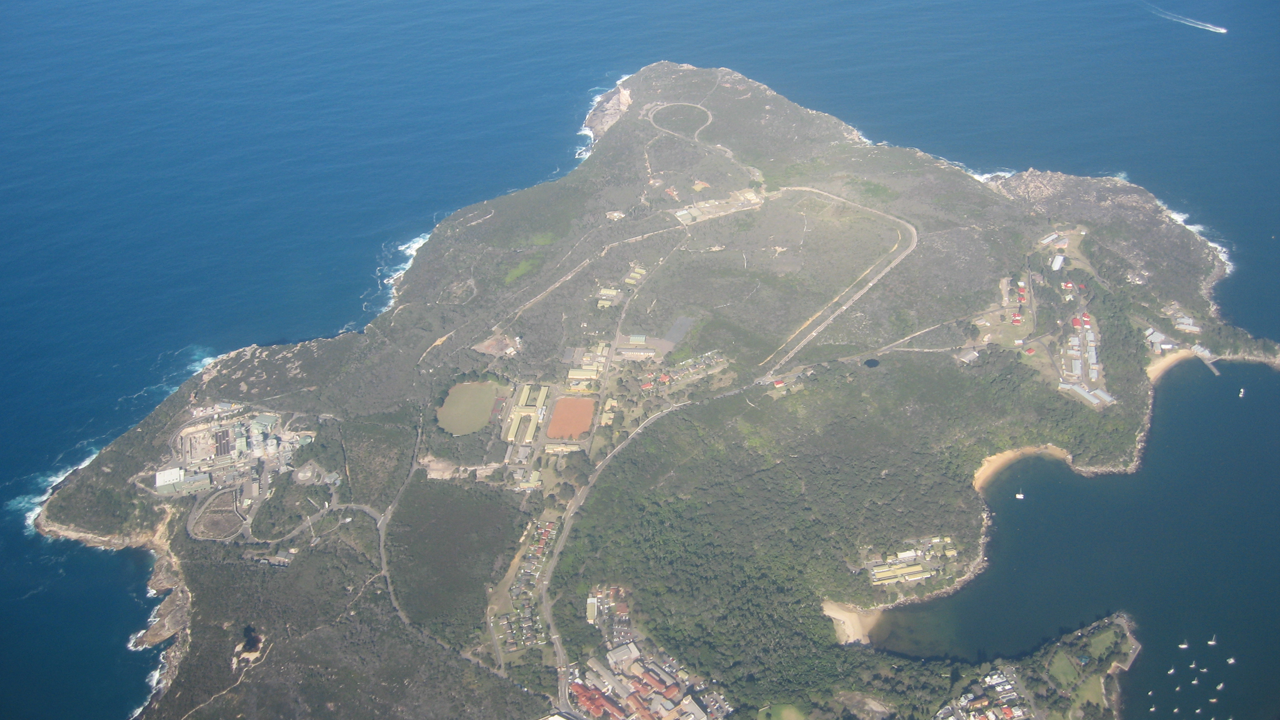
An aerial view of North Head showing the former quarantine station, centre, pictured in 2007

The North Head Quarantine Station is a heritage-listed former quarantine station and associated buildings that is now a tourist attraction at North Head Scenic Drive, on the north side of Sydney Harbour at North Head, near Manly. It is also known as North Head Quarantine Station & Reserve and Quarantine Station & Reserve. The property is owned by the Office of Environment & Heritage. The buildings and site were added to the New South Wales State Heritage Register on 2 April 1999. The entire 277-hectare (680-acre) North Head site, including the Quarantine Station and associated buildings and facilities, was added to the Australian National Heritage List on 12 May 2006, and now forms part of the Sydney Harbour National Park.

The complex operated as a quarantine station from 14 August 1832 to 29 February 1984. The concept behind its establishment was that, as an island-nation, the Colony of New South Wales, as it then was, was susceptible to ship-borne disease. Those who might have an infectious disease would be kept in quarantine until it was considered safe to release them. The isolation and strategic role of North Head was recognised in 1828 when the first vessel, the Bussorah Merchant, was quarantined at Spring Cove. The importance and future role of North Head was reinforced by Governor Darling's Quarantine Act of 1832, which set aside the whole of North Head for quarantine purposes in response to the 1829–51 cholera pandemic in Europe.

The station is now home to a hotel, conference centre, and restaurant complex known as Q Station, and remains part of the Sydney Harbour National Park. One of the early quarantine officers was Dr James Stuart, a keen naturalist and painter. For many years Percy Nolan, an alderman and mayor of Manly, pushed for the removal of the Quarantine Station from Manly and called for its use as public open space. Over sixty years later, this far-sighted proposal became a reality.

In the 1960s and 70s, the officer then in charge of the Quarantine Station, Herb Lavaring BEM (1917–1998), took it upon himself to preserve and compile a museum of artifacts and other items of note and significance to the station's operations, including domestic implements, medical instruments, and hand tools for tasks ranging from blacksmithing to building construction. Lavaring collected these materials over the period 1963–1975 and also commenced restoration work on the diverse range of rock carvings and headstones from the major burial grounds. The items collected by Lavaring were preserved, and many have since found their way into state and federal collections, including the National Museum of Australia in Canberra, where a muzzle-loading rifle and a set of manacles are preserved (the latter being used to ensure that no one left the station without medical clearance).

One of the most historic features of the quarantine station is the series of engravings along the escarpment adjacent to the jetty. The carvings were executed by people staying at the quarantine station, and cover an extensive period that stretched from the early nineteenth century to the mid-twentieth century. Some were executed by stonemasons and sculptors and show a high degree of skill. More carvings are located at the rock formation known as Old Man's Hat.

== History ==
The Quarantine Station was established primarily to regulate the risk of disease importation through the migration of free and convict Europeans, and the arrival of merchant shipping. There was always a close link between the requirement for quarantine and the ebb and flow of sea-borne immigration; and the growth of the Quarantine Station from the 1830s parallels the changes in immigration policy and practice. The other major influence was the imperative to limit disruption to the increasingly commercially-sensitive shipping industry.

As the dominant headland of the harbour, North Head was of importance in navigation from the time of the First Fleet. By 1809 navigational plans were showing an obelisk, located in what was to become the Quarantine Station precinct, presumed to have been used as a channel marker for vessels negotiating the Sow and Pigs Reef. A 10-metre-high (33 ft) obelisk still exists on this site, which may be the original marker, making it potentially one of the oldest European structures on Sydney Harbour.

Up until the 1830s, the majority of ships requiring quarantine were convict transports, and being under government contract, the somewhat informal proclamation of quarantine by the Governor of the day was easy to enforce. One reason for the introduction of formal statutory regulation for quarantine in NSW in 1832 was the increasing rate of free immigrant vessels entering port. In 1831 thirty four immigrant ships had arrived, and this increased to 63 in 1832. The captains of these free vessels were less ready to comply with such informal and ad hoc processes, thus a legislated requirement for all ships entering port to be screened for disease, and quarantined if necessary, was needed.

Another problem with the changing nature of the shipping entering Sydney was the increasing time constraints placed on the captains of commercial vessels, necessitating rapid turn-around in port-time wasted in port, and in quarantine, was income lost. The convict ships, under government contract, could be isolated for the period of quarantine with little added expense, but free commercial carriers sought demurrage from government for any delays it imposed. In part, the disruption to shipping caused by traditional quarantine practices led to the progressive move away from detention-based quarantine in Britain through the middle years of the 19th century.

=== Following passage of the Quarantine Act, 1832 ===
When the 1832 Quarantine Act was passed in NSW, Viscount Goderich, British Secretary of State for War and Colonies, warned that quarantine was prejudicial to the trade of the kingdom and that the colony should be aware of the importance of "not aggravating by unnecessary restrictions the embarrassment inseparable from a strict quarantine on British Vessels".

The initial quarantine practice of housing the sick on board the vessel in which they arrived, was dispensed with after the experience with the long detention of the Lady Macnaghten in 1837, and the subsequent heavy demurrage claimed for that delay. After that time the sick were removed from their ship and housed ashore, while the ship was fumigated and scoured for return to the owner with the minimum delay. A consequence of this decision was the construction of permanent accommodation and stores buildings at the Quarantine Station at North Head.

The alarming experiences of quarantine in 1837 and 1838 prompted a review in the colony of the organisation and conditions aboard immigrant ships. The final report, arising as a NSW initiative, pricked the sensitivities of the British emigration officials, but nevertheless had positive outcomes. The review indicated that there was insufficient checking of the health of the emigrants before boarding; there was insufficient concern with diet during the voyage, especially for the needs of children; and that the formula of three children equalling one adult when allocating food and berth space aboard required reconsideration, as it led to excessive number of children in cramped spaces, with inadequate food. Finally it indicated that the surgeon-superintendent aboard ship required more authority to regulate and promote good health and good order among the emigrants.

The subsequent reorganisation of the system resulted in interviews and medical checks on would-be emigrants before embarking them; vaccination for smallpox of all emigrants; the signing of undertakings to follow the directions of the surgeon-superintendent on voyage and better definition of his role and powers; improvements in diet and hospital accommodation aboard; and moves to prevent overcrowding.

The rate of mortality improved dramatically. In 1840 the death rate for children fell from one in ten to one in seventeen, and that for adults also fell. With the improved conditions the rate of quarantine declaration of immigrant ships also fell in 1840, from three ships out of 43 in 1839 to one out of 40 in 1840.

Immigration was reduced from 1842 due to the economic recession in the colony, as the decline in land sales had reduced the pool of funds earmarked to support the migration scheme. Immigration was at a standstill from 1842 until 1848, and only one ship was quarantined in this period. The resumption of immigration in 1847-48 led to a review of the adequacy of the Quarantine Station, but no real increase in accommodation resulted.

The arrival of the Beejapore in 1853, with over one thousand passengers, at a time when the Quarantine Station could accommodate 150 persons, triggered a new building phase. As a temporary measure, the hulk Harmony was purchased and moored in Spring Cove as a hospital ship. The Beejapore was an experiment in trying to reduce migration costs by using two-deck vessels, and the outcome was judged not to be a success. Fifty-five people died during the voyage, and a further sixty two died at the Quarantine Station, from the illnesses of measles, scarlet fever and typhus fever. The majority of the passengers and crew had to be housed in tents. The biggest impetus for change came not so much from a concern about poor housing, but rather a concern for the morals of the married women and the "200 single women let loose in the bush" that represented the undeveloped station at that time. The resulting changes to the station, besides the use of the hospital ship, included the construction of a barracks for the single women in the former Sick Ground, surrounded by a double fence with a sentry stationed between them, to prevent communication with the women. Two new buildings were built in the Healthy Ground, each to house sixty people, with verandahs for dining. The original burial ground was levelled and the grave stones removed to the new burial ground, thus further removing the burials from the view of the Healthy Ground. Eight quarters were also built for the Superintendent.

=== 1860s to 1890s ===
The downturn in immigration during the economically stagnant period of the 1860s, triggered by the colonial government cancelling the regulations to provide assisted passage to migrants in 1860, limited the use of the Quarantine Station, and the willingness of the government to spend money on its upkeep. As a result of this downturn between 1860 and 1879 only 138 immigrant vessels arrived [compared with 410 between 1840 and 1859], and of these 33 required cleansing at the Quarantine Station, but few required their passengers to be landed and accommodated. In the same period 29 merchant or naval vessels were quarantined, but again mainly for the cleansing of the ship rather than the landing of diseased crews.

The run-down Quarantine Station had become unsuitable for passenger quarantine, and particularly for first and second class passenger accommodation, by the time the Hero was in need of quarantine for smallpox in 1872. The passengers were kept aboard the ship, because the station could not adequately house them. The inadequacy was further publicised during the quarantine of the Baroda in 1873, when first class passengers had to do their own washing. Well-connected passengers ensured that government attention was focussed on the shortcomings of the Station accommodation. As result, a new group of First Class accommodation buildings were built in the Healthy Ground.

From 1881 to 1894, a smallpox hospital ship, Faraway, was anchored off the Quarantine Station, and before that at Sirius Cove. The ship hulk had been converted to a hospital ship by the beginning of 1877, and was already in use during January 1877. Largely as a result of poor outcomes during the 1881-1882 smallpox epidemic, in 1884, Faraway was upgraded, at Mort's Dock, to a more suitable floating hospital with two wards and 100 beds. The ship was thereafter officially known as the Floating Quarantine Hospital.

As steam navigation became more common, the costs of delays to shipping schedules by quarantine became more pressing. By the 1870s the detention of a steamer could cost from £20 to £300 per day, and shipping agents and owners could not see why Australia was not following Britain's lead in abandoning quarantine regulations. In response the Assistant Health Officer was based at Watson's Bay from 1882, to reduce delays in inspection. The Shipping Owner's Association also requested the provision of Asiatic accommodation at the Quarantine Station, a better supply of water there, the supply of a steam launch to take supplies to the quarantined ships, and printed instructions for Captains of quarantined vessels.11 The issue of abandoning quarantine was raised again in 1882, and in his report on the issue the new Health Officer, C.H. Mackellar, dismissed the suggestion and suggested a federation of quarantine efforts, to detect and cleanse infected ships as they reached the continent at places such as Thursday Island and Albany, not just as they reached Sydney. Mackellar also recommended the upgrade of the Station, with the introduction of a light tram, a new reservoir, improved cleansing facilities at the wharf, a better hospital, new accommodation, and picket fences to delineate zones in the quarantine. Most of these suggestions were acted on, and some of the buildings survive.

=== 1900s to date ===
When the Commonwealth took over responsibility for the Quarantine Service after 1909, and particularly after the creation of the Department of Health in 1921, the nature of quarantine changed for merchant shipping. The Commonwealth drew together the Quarantine Stations in the various states, and tried to diversify the operations so that some ships were intercepted at out-lying ports before they reached Sydney. Albany, Melbourne and Thursday Island, in particular played a major role in this new pattern of nationwide quarantine.

The growth of the other states also meant that shipping was more evenly distributed in terms of destination than had been the case in the nineteenth century. In the period 1901 to 1940, Sydney and Melbourne had roughly similar numbers of assisted immigrants (134,864 and 115,988 respectively), and the other States had, in combination, more immigrants than either Sydney or Melbourne, totalling 174,526. By 1958 there were 39 "first ports of entry" into Australia. Thirty-two sea ports had staff capable of carrying out quarantine inspections, ten ports were "landing places" for air entry; major quarantine stations with accommodation were established at five ports, and there were three minor quarantine stations at other Ports.

Following the First World War, Australian soldiers returning from Europe were quarantined on the SS Argyllshire due to concerns about Spanish flu. After some attempted to escape, authorities offered North Head as an off-ship quarantine site. However, North Head was not prepared, and the soldiers had to clear the land themselves, reportedly killing 60 snakes in the first night. On 11 February 1919, 900 soldiers marched off the site. After being met by authorities, they were then allowed to quarantine at the Sydney Cricket Ground. Only one soldier was court-martialled. One local snake expert offered to clear the site of snakes.

The impact of improved medical science, immunisation, and quarantine procedures in the twentieth century is perhaps shown most dramatically by the fact that though the post-WWII immigration was vastly more than had gone before, the number of ships or aeroplanes quarantined plummeted proportionately. Sydney received nearly 700,000 assisted immigrants between 1946 and 1980, or nearly double the number it had received between 1831 and 1940, yet only four ships were quarantined in that period and at least one of those was a tanker.

In all, between 1828 and 1984 at least 580 vessels were quarantined at the Quarantine Station. More than 13,000 people were quarantined at the station of whom an estimated 572 died and were buried there.

== Description ==
=== European/Asian cultural heritage ===
North Head is situated at the entrance to Sydney Harbour. It is a huge sandstone bluff rising 80 metres (260 ft) above sea level. At the time of European settlement North Head was linked to the mainland by only a narrow sand spit that separated the harbour from the sea. Early depictions of North Head show the dramatic upheaval of the land form that sloped from the high cliffs on the eastern seaboard back to the protected waters of the harbour to the west. Today North Head appears as a natural extension of the Manly peninsula due to the filling of medium rise building development on the low-lying land of the present-day site of Manly and the mature vegetation through that urban development. The Quarantine Station is situated on the western side of North Head, on the natural amphitheatre of land centred on Quarantine beach. The site was originally designated as all the land with a 500-metre (1,600 ft) radius of the beach. The area is fringed by a continuous tract of bushland on the north, south and eastern sides, and by the harbour on the western side.

The curtilage for this Conservation Management Plan is the western side of North Head, which has the Quarantine Station as its core. In order to allow description and analysis of this study curtilage, five precincts have been delineated within the study curtilage as follows:

1. the Quarantine Station Precinct;
2. the Park Hill Precinct;
3. the Spring Cove Precinct;
4. the Quarantine [South] Precinct; and
5. the Marine Precinct.

In addition, where Quarantine Station-related sites occur beyond the briefed study area (such as within the Department of Defence-owned property), these sites are detailed following the "precinctual" discussion. Each of these precincts and related Quarantine Station sites are examined below.

Within the physical overview of the buildings and site elements of the various precincts, the "description fields" have been used, as appropriate.

==== Historical archaeology sites ====
As a preamble to the precinct-specific overview, summary statements that relate to the historical inscriptions, the historical archaeology sites, and cultural landscape features for the study area have been informed by the 1985 and 1992 Conservation Plans 1 and 2, and by NPWS publications and other reports.

===== The historical inscriptions =====
Quarantine internees commenced a tradition of making inscriptions, including poems, initials, memorials and drawings, in the 1830s. This continued throughout the life of the Quarantine Station. Nineteenth and early twentieth century examples include engraved and painted inscriptions on soft sandstone faces, structures and slate storm-water drain covers. Eight hundred and fifty four examples have been recorded, though at least 1,000 other examples exist.

The inscriptions commemorate quarantine events, ships and people from the ships and deceased internees. They are located throughout the place with concentrations around the Wharf Precinct and The Old Mans Hat. English and other European, Asian and Arabic languages were used. The most recent inscriptions are a series of written examples on internal walls of Building A20, deriving from its use as a detention centre for illegal immigrants. Most of these appear to have been written by people from the Pacific Islands, some in islander languages, many being laments on their authors' detention or abuses directed at their detainers.

Most of the inscriptions are on quarried or natural sandstone surfaces. A few occur on cement or plaster surfaces and several on built elements such as brick walls, drain covers and the Cannae Point flagstaff. Some have been re-worked in the past or are highlighted by paint. A large percentage of the inscriptions are in good condition, easily located and readily legible. Aspect, topography and environmental agents [sun, wind, rain] affect the condition of inscriptions but the major factor is the quality of stone, i.e. the softer less silicified the sandstone the faster it deteriorates.

Seeping ground water, lichen, moss, wind and vegetation abrasion and visitor contact are additional agents of deterioration. The latter is now minimised through a policy of controlled access. The inscriptions in Building A20 have a life limited to that of the paintwork and plaster render on internal walls. A preliminary analysis of European rock inscriptions was completed in 1983, and an interim report on the conservation of rock inscriptions at the Quarantine Station was completed in March 1999, as part of a joint project between the NPWS, Sydney, North Sub-District and the NPWS Cultural Heritage Services Division.

The recommendations of the 1983 analysis were:

1. that the engravings at The Old Mans Hat be recorded by a similar program (such as that at the Quarantine Station core precinct) in order to complete the record of the resource;
2. that, it funds become available, an indexing system of the inscriptions be devised for the complete resource; and
3. that further research is carried out to identify whether similar engravings have been located at other Quarantine facilities as a means of assessing the National Heritage value of this material.

The 1999 Interim Report provided specific conservation recommendations for the Wharf Area and The Old Mans Hat inscriptions, and general conservation management recommendations for visitor management and monitoring. These recommendations are included as recommendations of this Plan.

The inscriptions are valuable and unusual graphic illustrations of historical incidents and social patterns of Quarantine Station history. They provide a very tangible and "human" link with the past for present generations and are a valuable historical and genealogical resource. Their research potential is enormous. The inscriptions record a variety of information which cannot be obtained from any other source, especially the feelings of non-English speaking migrants.

===== Historical archaeological sites =====
The 1998 North Head Quarantine Station Conservation Plan archaeological survey forms the current basis of assessment of areas within the active Quarantine Station area. That report diagrammatically indicated the historical archaeological sites and structures within or adjacent the North Head Quarantine Station core precinct.

The 1991 North Head archaeological site survey forms the basis of the assessment of areas outside the active Quarantine Station area. That report indicated the following historical archaeological sites and structures within or adjacent the North Head Quarantine Station study area:

1. the sandstone boundary wall leading from the North Head Road to Collins Beach;
2. the sandstone boundary wall south-east of the Quarantine Station (Site No. L10);
3. the Australian Institute of Police Management, incorporating parts of the venereal diseases hospital, the Second and Third Quarantine Cemeteries (Sites L1 and VA1); and
4. the Old Mans Hat inscription area; and the Quarantine Head gun emplacement.

All of these sites and structures are related to the history of the Quarantine Station, and are significant physical evidence of the development and contraction of quarantine functions over time. However, the vast majority of buildings and archaeological sites are located within the zone of most intensive quarantine activity, which is more or less contiguous with the current NPWS managed area of the Quarantine Station. The NPWS has carried out a number of historical archaeological surveys of areas of the Quarantine Station itself, though there has as yet been no systematic survey of the entire study area. These surveys have identified a large number of former building sites and other features, and has indicated where as yet unlocated building sites might be located. The site numbers beginning with "P" relate to "Potential Sites". Forty-eight such sites had been identified by 1992. Because the Quarantine Station has experienced over 150 years of quarantine activity, there is a layering of evidence on and in the ground that reflects the slow growth of the Station, the major development and redevelopment programs, and the subsequent removals and constructions. This evidence exists as independent evidence, though it is also complementary to the documentary evidence, and in large part cannot be interpreted without reference to the latter. Because the land-use over this period has been solely devoted to quarantine, the evidence is, on the whole, only impacted by later quarantine activity, so the understanding of both the creation and the destruction of the former buildings and landscape elements contributes to the story of quarantine. Because in many cases current building a relocated on the same sites as earlier building, and as many of the surviving buildings have a long history of their own, all sub-floor deposits are considered to have archaeological potential. The changes over time reflected by the surviving buildings and features and the archaeological sites reflect various aspects of the history of quarantine, public health and society as a whole. The stories able to be illuminated by the physical evidence include, among many others: the Aboriginal occupation of North Head; the changing attitudes to quarantine and its administration; the developing medical and epidemiological knowledge; the development of Australia's immigration policies, and the experience of individuals and groups within that history; the changing attitudes to class and race; the iconography used by inmates to memorialise their experience, in the 1,000 plus inscriptions, memorials and gravestones, and Australia's experience of war, both in the diseases contracted by the military personnel buried in the Quarantine Station cemeteries, and in the direct defence of Sydney. An unusual aspect of the collection of historical archaeological evidence at the Quarantine Station is that it all contributes to the understanding of this one theme of quarantine as well as to associated broader themes, and a large amount of evidence appears to have survived. This vests the archaeological sites with a very high research potential for ongoing study of this important aspect of Australian history. In addition to the archaeological potential of buildings which have been demolished, the Quarantine Station buildings also offer the opportunity to research the archaeology of standing structures. As a tightly dated and well-documented group of buildings they have potential to provide information on changes in domestic living arrangements over the past 150 years.

Since 1992 a number of the potential sites have been confirmed by the location of above-ground evidence, or the identification of evidence during works. A systematic survey and recording program is required both within and outside of the Planning Area to identify the complete historical archaeological resource. This comprehensive survey is required as much of the archaeological resource of the Quarantine Station is confined to the thin vegetated surface and the poorly consolidated sandy soils beneath. The fragility of the sites makes them prone to disturbance from excessive foot or vehicle traffic, erosion and animal burrowing. A preliminary Archaeological Management Plan has been prepared by the NPWS to accompany this Conservation Management Plan; and the policy recommendations of that Plan have been incorporated into this Conservation Management Plan.

===== The Quarantine Station cultural landscape =====
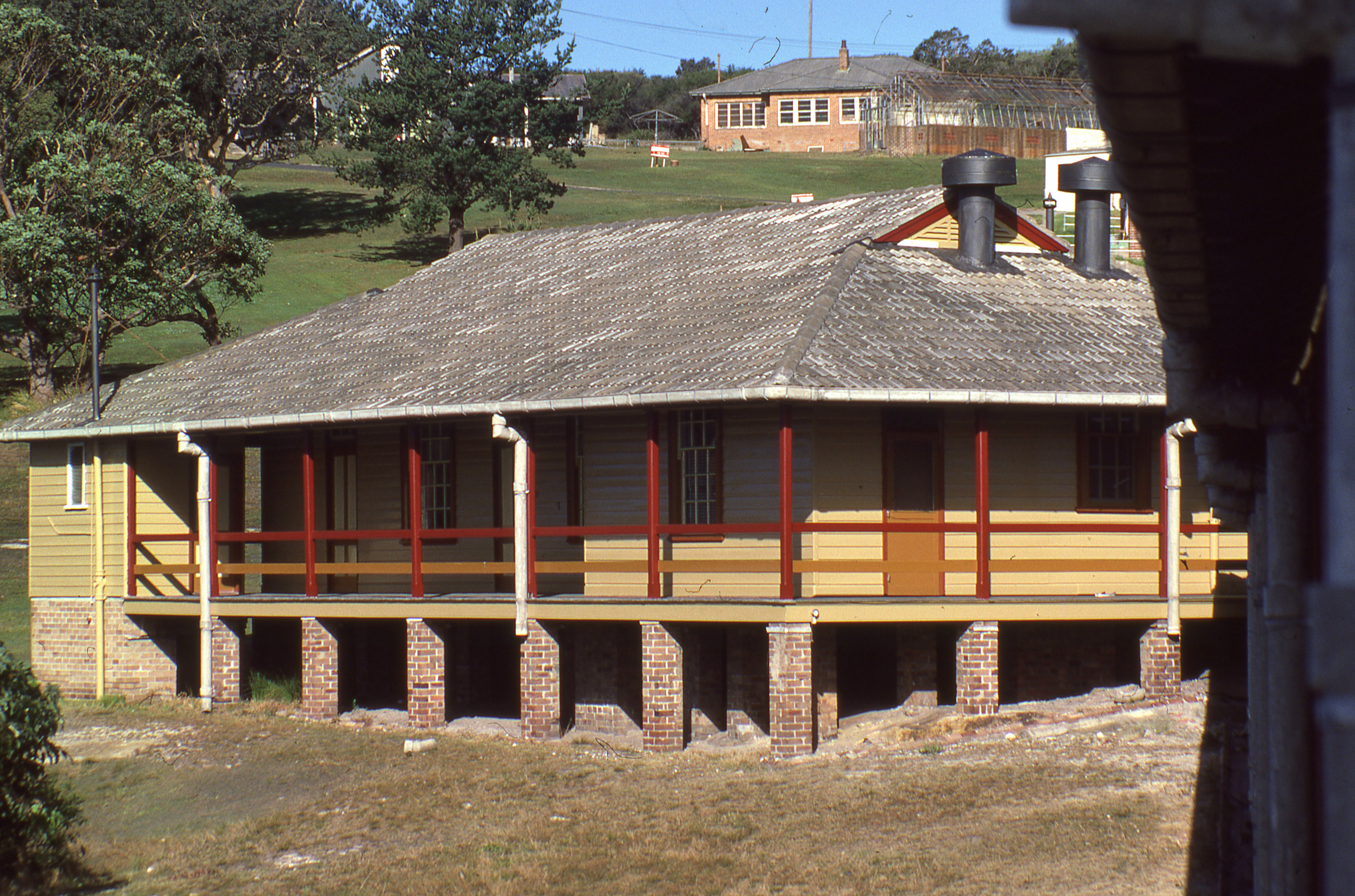
Quarantine Station buildings, pictured in 1986

The landscape of the Quarantine Station core precinct can be properly described as a cultural landscape. It is a landscape heavily impacted by human activity, even the "natural" bushland areas are humanly modified; and the most obvious elements in the landscape are the various layers of human clearing and construction, amid large areas of bushland and interspersed with bush patches.

The main developed area consists of the Quarantine Station itself. This has three main groups of buildings: the wharf and foreshore buildings at Quarantine Beach, the hospital group, and the buildings on the upper grassy slopes, with grassy cleared areas around these groups, delineated by bushland remnants and regrowth. This creates a semi-rural, village-like atmosphere which is uncommon in the otherwise closely developed Sydney metropolitan area. The cultural landscape has heritage values in its own right, as a document demonstrating the planning and construction of the station over its entire life. The landscape also has a strong interpretative value.

The isolation of the Station, the long views out to other parts of the harbour, the contrast between manicured grassy areas and surrounding bush, which was alien to most of the inmates, and the strict classification of occupation areas within the Station, combine to trigger the historical imagination and allow the visitor to empathise with those quarantined here.

The landscape is also visually important not only to visitors to the Quarantine Station but also to viewers from other headlands, suburbs or on the harbour. Many distinctive or prominent landscape elements contribute to the multiple layering of human experience on the landscape.

A strong element in the cultural landscape is the conscious and enforced "classification" of the land, based on health issues, class and race. This includes the isolation of the hospital, seen but not approached from many parts of the Station; the wharf and "disinfection" area, which stood as a barrier between the inmates and the main line of escape, and the administration area, which "guarded" the land route out; the lateral separation of the first, second and third class passengers, with the administration area interposed between third class and the rest, imposing class distinctions in the landscape; and the lateral and elevational separation of the Asian accommodation, away from first and second class, and below third class, imposing a racial layer on top of the class one. The following discussion of the Quarantine Station cultural landscape refers specifically to the cultural landscape elements which provide the meaning and understanding of how these landscapes worked historically. These elements include the Quarantine Station cemeteries; monuments; fences and walls; boundary markers and walls; obelisks and cairns; and of course tracks, paths and roads.

===== Cemeteries =====
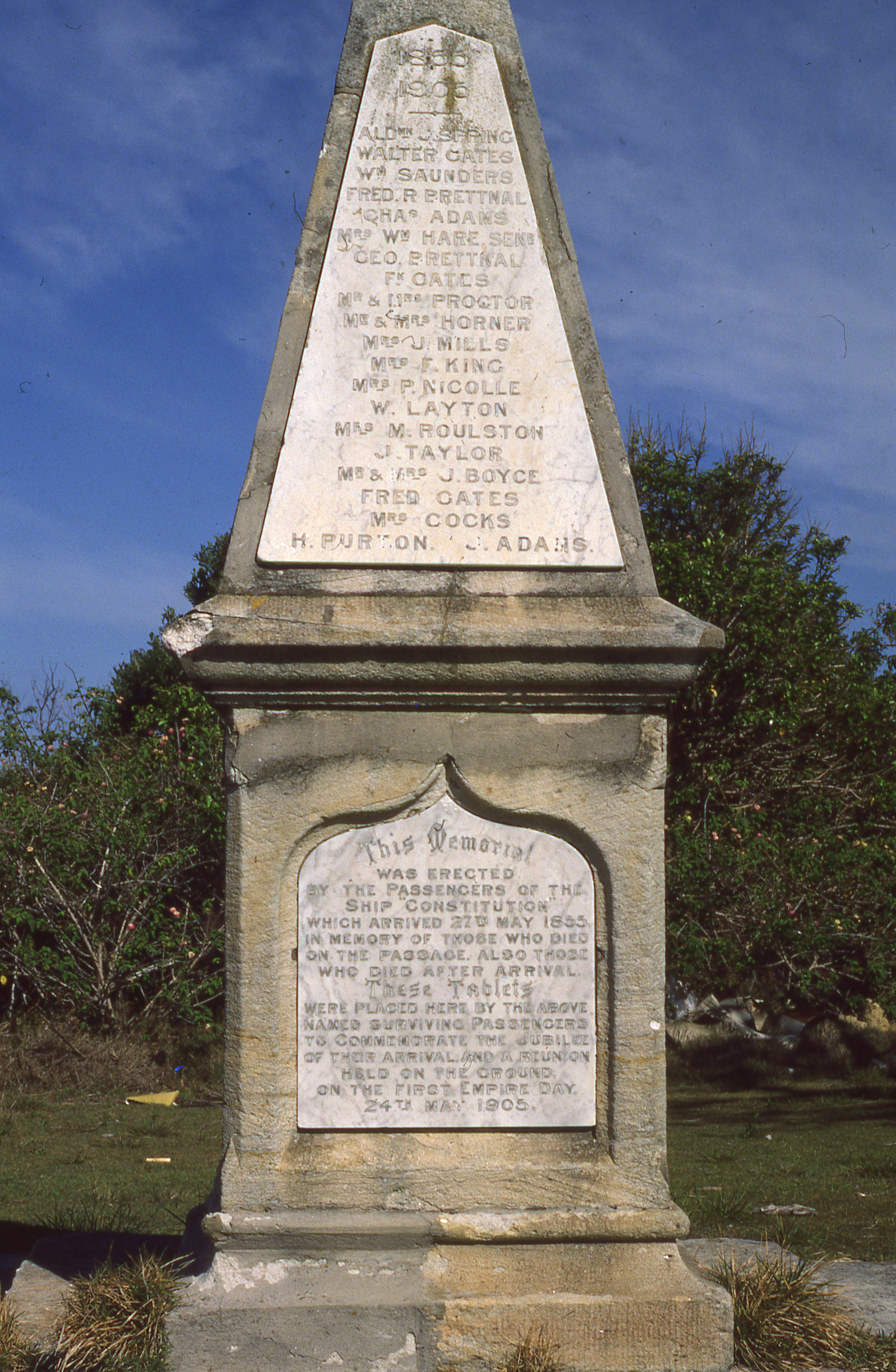
A memorial stone for passengers and crew of the ship, Constitution, who died either on passage to Australia, or following arrival in May 1905, while the passengers were in quarantine

Three cemeteries functioned throughout the history of the Station. The approximate location of the First Cemetery (Site IIIA1, c. 1837–1853), is at the junction of the Wharf and Hospital roads, however no visible evidence remains, so it is not a landscape element except to those with knowledge of its existence.

The unfortunate positioning of the First Cemetery, always in the view of the well and recovering, was soon recognised, and the subsequent cemeteries were moved out of the perceived landscape of those quarantined. The Second Cemetery (Site L1, 1853–1881), is located east of the 3rd Class precinct. Three headstones remain in situ (two obscured by vegetation), and the outline of another two graves visible. The cemetery is separated from the experiential landscape of the quarantined unless they chose to visit it. The Third Cemetery (Site VA1, 1881–1925), is within the School of Artillery, on Commonwealth property. Two hundred and forty one burials are registered, and the cemetery retains many headstones and markers, protected by a chain wire three-metre high person-proof fence. This cemetery is even more removed from the Quarantine Station landscape than the second cemetery was. The Second and Third cemeteries become obscured and prone to bushfire if native vegetation is not regularly slashed. Erosion of grave sites occurs if the cemeteries are heavily visited or if stabilising vegetation, especially grasses, is removed. There has been natural weathering and corrosion of sandstone headstones and wooden cross grave markers. Uncontrolled public access to these cemeteries, especially the Third, can result in vandalism or theft of remaining headstones and grave markers.

Some headstones from the First and Second cemeteries are now located in the artefact store within Building A20. Further research is required to relocate obscured graves.

The cemeteries are powerful reminders of the purpose of the Quarantine Station, its successes and failures and of its internees. They have historical, archaeological, genealogical and educational significance and special significance for descendants of those interred in them.

An archaeological assessment of the North Head Quarantine Station cemeteries; and an archaeological inspection report of the Third Quarantine Station cemetery have been prepared by the NPWS. These documents provide specific policy recommendations related to the conservation and management of the cemeteries, which are accepted as recommendations of this Conservation Management Plan.

This is a marble and sandstone monument which stands on the ridge above the 3rd Class Precinct. It commemorates the quarantining of the ship Constitution and its passengers and crew in 1855 and the reunion of surviving passengers and crew at the Quarantine Station 50 years later. It is in fair condition and requires some stonework and plaque repairs. It is symbolic of the events associated with, and the esprit de corps of, one ship's passengers and crew. Like the inscriptions in the Wharf precinct, it is one of the more obvious memorialising features in the Station landscape.

===== Fences and walls =====
The Quarantine Station study area landscape includes a variety of fences and walls which are integral to the history and past functioning of the place. Fencing, generally 1.8-metre-high (6 ft) paling fences, was the primary means of enforcing the separation of different groups of internees at the Quarantine Station. The impact of the fences, and clearing of bushland, on the appearance of the Station can be judged from historic photographs. The loss of the majority of fences creates a false impression of the Quarantine Station's layout and reduces the ability to experience the segregation that passengers were required to maintain. In this sense the cultural landscape significance of the fences has been lost, but could be regained by reconstruction.

These include:

- prominent sandstone block, 1.8-metre-high (6 ft) barrier walls, built in the 1930s Great Depression by workers on unemployment relief programs. These are located along boundary lines which show the subdivision of the Quarantine ground at that time for hospital, recreation and military purposes; a double chain wire three feet [one metre] high fence at the entry gate to the place which served as a "neutral zone" across which internees could talk with visitors;
- wooden paling fences around the staff cottages;
- chain wire 1.8-metre-high (6 ft) fences around the Isolation and Hospital precincts which separated them from healthy areas;
- foreshore stone and concrete walls at the Quarantine Beach wharf;
- low sandstone block kerbing and retaining walls on the main access roads; and
- section of remnant paling fences in bush around the Hospital area.

The sandstone block walls are generally in fair-to-good condition. Some sections, however, have collapsed due to water erosion undermining their footings. Further sections are in imminent danger of collapse. Blocks in the wall end near The Old Mans Hat have seriously eroded due to wind and salty sea spray. Wire fences are substantially intact, though are prone to rusting. Existing timber fences around staff cottages are of recent construction [1985-90], mostly in good condition, though prone to distortion due to high winds. The stone walls and site fencing generally are important legacies of quarantine isolation practices.

===== Obelisk =====
A prominent sandstone obelisk 9.1-metre-high (30 ft) stands on the south-eastern edge of the Station. An obelisk is shown at this location on site plans dating from 1807 to 1809, though it is not known if the existing one is the original. The memorial is in fair condition but requires some stonework repairs at the base. It may prove to be highly significant, if it is the original, as the oldest surviving structure on North Head and one of the oldest on Sydney Harbour. The obelisk is one of the few landscape elements relating to a non-quarantine function, though as navigation markers they relate to the overall maritime themes that include quarantine.

===== Roads and paths =====
Roads and paths throughout the place include the bitumen roads, sandstone-paved roads and pedestrian paths to The Old Mans Hat area and between the wharf and hospital areas. There is a hierarchy of paths and roads, ranging from sealed vehicle roads, through sealed footpaths and ramps, to unsealed tracks, especially into the surrounding bushland. These reflect how the landscape was lived in, and the strong separation of the managed landscape of the Station precincts and the informality of the surrounding areas such as The Old Mans Hat.

===== Stone cairn (Site IIIA3) =====
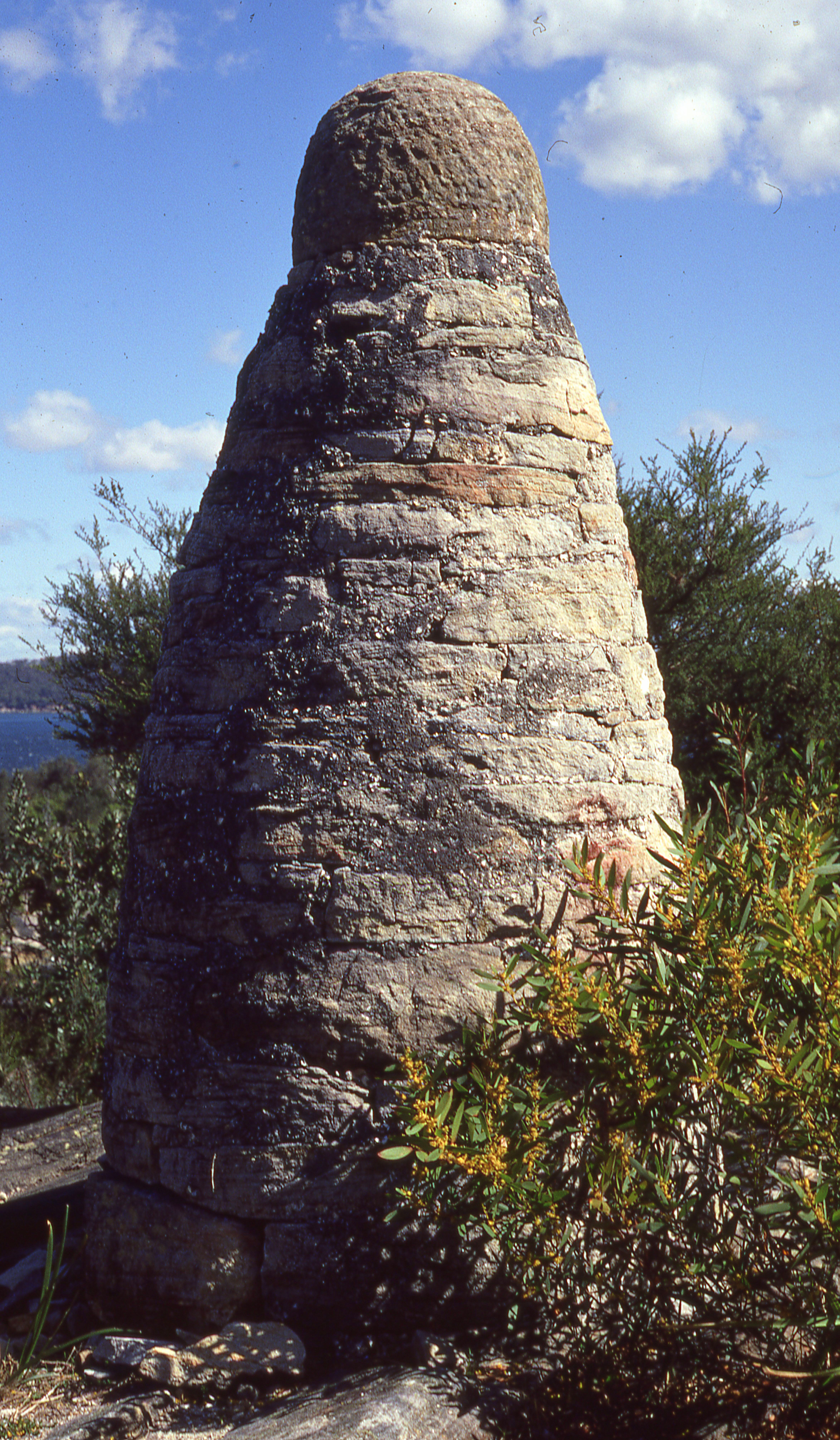
A stone cairn at Quarantine Station, pictured in 1986

A sandstone cairn stands adjacent to the 2nd Class Passenger Accommodation building P12. Built during the late 1830s, this is the sole remaining cairn of a line of thirteen which denoted the early boundary of the quarantine ground. It is in good condition. This cairn is the earliest surviving in situ structure associated with the place's quarantine function and demonstrates the early need for isolation and security.

=== Natural heritage ===
==== Overview and description ====
The study area for the natural heritage plan specifically requires consideration of the water body and the sea bed between Cannae Point and Spring Cove, including Quarantine Beach and store Beach; the Third Quarantine Cemetery within the former Defence land at North Head, and associated installations. The natural heritage items are those items recorded as occurring in the subject study area, or those items with a high probability of occurring within the area, based on studies, surveys and reports of the flora and fauna on North Head generally. Native bushland in the North Head Defence property and other parts of the North Head component of Sydney Harbour National Park is contiguous with bushland within the study area and fauna may move from one area to another.

Some fauna may occur sporadically or seasonally in different parts of North Head, and others such as raptors have territories which span large areas regardless of roads, walls or fences. Therefore, some of the conservation significance of the study area is linked to the wider context of North Head as a whole and even beyond. For example, the significance of the little penguin colony is considered in the context of other colonies and the feeding range of individual birds.

The maintenance of genetic diversity within plant communities is aided by free movement of bird, mammal and insect pollinators. Wind-borne pollen is dispersed widely; however maximum distances between plants which still allow effective pollination are seldom studied and, in consequence, little understood. It is axiomatic that larger units of vegetation enhance the prospects of long-term survival of genetic diversity in remnant plant communities.

Thus the biodiversity values of plants and animals in the study area are discussed in the broader context of those parts of North Head which are within Sydney Harbour National Park. Such an approach is appropriate for this Conservation Management Plan because the areas to the north and south of the Quarantine Station are declared as National Park, and their management for nature conservation in perpetuity is determined by the plan of management required under the National Parks and Wildlife Act 1974. The approach is also consistent with the requirements identified in the Commonwealth to State Land Exchange Agreement of 1979.

==== Little penguin colony, Little Collins Beach ====
Little Collins Beach has the only known mainland NSW breeding ground for the endangered little penguin, a colony which is protected by volunteers, each breeding season, to control predators. This was the scene of a massacre in 2015 when a fox attacked and killed 27 penguins, depleting the population. The colony extends from North Head to Manly Wharf.

== Heritage listing ==
The North Head Quarantine Station Study Area is an integral element of the North Head peninsula. The Aboriginal and Natural values of the NHQS relate to the peninsula as a whole; and the European/Asian cultural values relate to most of the peninsula, for the whole area was once Quarantine Reserve. The area represents a place of cultural and natural diversity reflecting the evolution of Sydney from Aboriginal occupation through European settlement to the landscape of today, representing many social, historic, recreational, environmental and educational values. The Heads maintain an iconic presence to the city as the gateway to Port Jackson and Sydney Harbour, and the city.

The Aboriginal heritage values of the North Head area are an intrinsic part of the significance of the place. Numerous Aboriginal traditions from various parts of the continent refer to and intermesh the creation of their natural and cultural environment; Sydney Harbour can be seen as the outcome of such a creative period. Aborigines were demonstrably present in the Sydney Basin many thousands of years before the present coastline was formed and would have experienced the actual creation of Port Jackson and Sydney Harbour with its rich and complex environment. The North Head area along with the other areas that form Sydney Harbour National Park retain Aboriginal heritage values in a physical setting that is substantially intact although embedded in the important urban setting of Sydney.

On a national scale, the Port Jackson environment, including North Head, formed the scene of or backdrop for some of the earliest and formative interaction between Aborigines and the British explorers and settlers. Archaeological sites remnant at NHQS are seen as symbolising Aboriginal prehistory and contact history. Just as the Heads became a symbol to "New" Australians of a possible new and better life, they are seen by many Aborigines as a symbol of their loss and disenfranchisement. Evidence of Aboriginal occupation is evident in more than forty recorded sites. An exceptional wealth of further information may be contained in the archaeology of the place and in particular in the Pleistocene sand dunes; the only undisturbed, vegetated high-level sand dunes in the Sydney region. Rare and endangered species of flora and fauna are refuged at the place and in the wider area of North Head. Considered alone or ecologically as part of North Head, the Quarantine Station area includes significant geodiversity and biodiversity components of the natural heritage of New South Wales. The Station is situated on an isolated cliff-bound tied island complex formed by the interaction of strong bedrock and erosion associated with changes of sea level tens of thousands of years ago. The headland is capped by Pleistocene high-level sand dunes which also occur within the Station complex. The natural biodiversity consists of isolated, remnant and disjunct communities, populations and species, six of which are scheduled on the Threatened Species Conservation Act [NSW] 1995. In addition to the threatened plant species there are over 450 other species of vascular plants and ferns representing 109 plant families. This level of genetic diversity is remarkable and scientifically important.

The endangered population of little penguin is significant as the only population of this species which breeds on the mainland of NSW. The characteristics which have enabled this population to persist in one of the busiest commercial harbours in the world are important for scientific study. The endangered population of long-nosed bandicoot is also scientifically important as a remnant population of a species which was formerly common and widespread in the Sydney region. The few remaining trees of Camfield's stringybark are a significant component of the entire genetic resource of this vulnerable species.

=== North Head Quarantine Station ===
The Quarantine Station occupies the first site officially designated as a place of Quarantine for people entering Australia. It is the nation's oldest and most intact facility of its type and can thus be ascribed national significance. Together with Point Nepean Station, and in terms of the story of quarantine and its role in controlled migration to Australia, the two Stations have to be considered as being nationally significant quarantine sites. The Station's use remained essentially unchanged from 1828 to 1984, and all buildings and development on the site reflect the changing social and scientific demands of Quarantine during that period. The formation and development of the Quarantine Station relates directly to the growth of Australia as a remote island nation. It symbolises the distance travelled and perils faced by many immigrants who first stood on Australian soil at the Quarantine Station. The site has symbolic significance for these reasons. The history of the site reflects the changing social and racial values of the Australian community and the development of medical practices in controlling infectious diseases. The site has historic significance in demonstrating and elucidating major themes in Australian history, immigration, the development of society and government, social welfare and health care, treatment of disease, transport and conservation. Evidence of the hardships experienced by European and Asian internees during their detention in Quarantine and the tragic deaths of some of them, is powerfully conveyed by the inscriptions on the gravestones, monuments and amongst the random inscriptions scattered throughout the site. The rugged topography of the southern rock cliffs in the area of the Old Mans Hat, where the power of the sea is manifest, and where the healthy and sick internees sought relief from the confinement of the Quarantine Station, contrasts strongly with the sanctuary of Quarantine and Store Beaches, where European vessels were first quarantine and from where the food gathering and cultural activities of Aboriginal people were abruptly halted. The views to the Station and to North Head from the city of Sydney; and from the Station down the length of Port Jackson are significant for their iconic value. The class system which permeated Colonial society in this country is illustrated clearly in the extant building fabric and in cultural landscape which contains the subtle evidence of the fences and paths which were contrived to maintain absolute separation between the classes and races, and between the healthy and the sick, the dying and the dead, at the Quarantine Station. The whole place displays evidence of natural systems, historic built forms and historical associations with the experience of quarantine have been retained largely intact due to its relative isolation on North Head.

North Head Quarantine Station was listed on the New South Wales State Heritage Register on 2 April 1999 having satisfied the following criteria.

The place is important in demonstrating the course, or pattern, of cultural or natural history in New South Wales.

European/Asian heritage

The North Head Quarantine Station is the oldest and most intact of the quarantine stations in Australia. It was always the pre-eminent place of quarantine among the colonies, both because of its early beginnings, and because it led in many of the advances in quarantine practice. The Station's function remained unchanged from 1828 to 1984 and all buildings and developments illustrate the changing social and scientific demands of quarantine during that period. The station was also central to the development of the colony of NSW's responses to local epidemics of infectious diseases. The history of the Quarantine Station, which is well illustrated by its buildings, sites, landscapes and the functions that took place there, interconnects with a number of key themes in NSW's history. The demands of quarantine, and the spotlight this cast on health standards, forced improvements in the conditions experienced by immigrants travelling to NSW, through the nineteenth century in particular. The procedures established for the quarantine of inbound shipping set the foundation for responding to the various local smallpox, plague and influenza epidemics up until the 1920s. The Quarantine Station also provided a safe haven to which the ill could be removed and treated. On a broader scale, the Quarantine Station dramatically demonstrates, in its development of arrangements to separate and deal differently with different classes and races of people, the changes in the social attitudes of the colony and State. This separation based on social status was most clearly evidenced by the barrier fences erected between the various class "compounds". The final transfer of the Quarantine Station to the State reflected the now-common pattern whereby land formerly reserved for special purposes, and protected from the development pressures of the urban areas surrounding them, became valued for the cultural and natural values they possessed and were re-gazetted for conservation purposes when no longer needed for their special purposes.

Natural heritage

Some of the earliest collections of marine specimens were made at Spring Cove and are now housed in the Australian Museum. These collections were made in the 1830s and therefore have significance in the natural history of Sydney Harbour. The Little Penguin population is the only remaining mainland population of this species in New South Wales. This is important to the natural history of this species. Continued survival of the Little Penguin is equally important to the future pattern of conservation management of endangered species. The successful management of other threatened species in the Quarantine Station is similarly important to the course of NSW's natural history. The effects on other biodiversity elements of the further decline or loss of these threatened species is unknown but could be significant to the natural history of the place.

The place has a strong or special association with a person, or group of persons, of importance of cultural or natural history of New South Wales's history.

Aboriginal heritage

North Head is associated with the Aboriginal presence, ownership and use of the land prior to and after European settlement as a site where the Cameraigal Aboriginal clan first saw the European settlers. As part of the wider Manly area it is associated with named Aboriginal persons, such as Bungaree's wife Gooseberry, Bennelong and Wil-le-me-ring, who played a part in the early European settlement of Sydney. Due to an apparent misunderstanding, Governor Phillip was speared by Wil-le-me-ring in a bay in or near the Quarantine area, possibly Spring Cove or Little Manly Cove.

European/Asian heritage

The Quarantine Station has played an important part in the lives of many Australians, with over 13,000 persons, including convicts and free migrants to NSW and many Sydney residents, being quarantined, of whom an estimated 572 have died and are buried there. The inscriptions at the site are an unusual testimony to those associations. The Station has also been closely associated with the administration of health by NSW and the Commonwealth, and a number of health administrators prominent in the development of NSW's public health policies and practices have had close and long associations with the Station. These included Deas Thomson, Capt. H.H. Browne, Dr Savage, Dr Allyne, Dr J. H. L. Cumpston, and Dr W. P. Norris. The Station also has association with the architects and designers and builders who created the Station; particularly the office of the NSW Colonial Architect to 1908, and the Commonwealth Department of Works & Railways, particularly George Oakeshore of the Sydney office. There has been no comprehensive survey of the architects/designers involved in the NHQS buildings. The Station played a pivotal role in the post-WWII period with the housing of illegal immigrants as detainees and refugees to Australia. The Station thus reflects the maritime arrival and "processing" not only of quarantined immigrants, but also of illegal and refugee arrivals. The 'down-turn' in Station activity parallelled the post-WWII change to airborne migration. Finally, the Station was the setting for socio-political dramas such as the revolt of the returned and quarantined troops after WWI; and the confrontations between secular and religious authorities in NSW over access by religious entities to the Quarantine Station.

The place is important in demonstrating aesthetic characteristics and/or a high degree of creative or technical achievement in New South Wales.

European/Asian heritage

The Quarantine Station has a cultural landscape that is distinctly associated with its unusual functions. It was a landscape of rigid control, which is associated with and reinforced the institutional and functional nature of the place. The present day Harbour context is now recognised as being a visually attractive setting of natural bush and harbour views. The unity of the design and form of the buildings, set within grassy precincts, which convey a pleasant village-like feeling, unusual within the Sydney metropolitan area. The Quarantine Station bears witness to the evolution of public health policy in NSW and Australia generally, and the development of practices and procedures designed to protect the colony, state and nation from infectious disease. The quarantine system, which reached its full form in the first decades of this century, was a significant technical achievement, and was in part developed at the North Head Quarantine Station where it is well demonstrated in the surviving fabric. Aspects of this technical achievement can be seen in the remanent quarantine technology at the Station e.g. The fumigation chamber, shower blocks and autoclaves.

Natural heritage

The aesthetic characteristics derived from the natural values of heath vegetation and sandstone cliff geomorphology within the Quarantine Station are an integral part of the outstanding aesthetic values of North Head conserved as part of the Sydney Harbour National Park. These values are derived from the expanse of uninterrupted cliff face and vegetated headlands. They are appreciated and enjoyed both from offshore and within Port Jackson. Together with those of South Head, they have enormous emotional impact on people arriving and leaving Sydney by sea. This impact is greater because the sheer cliff faces are capped with continuous low heath vegetation rather than tall forest or prominent buildings. Spectacular views of the drowned valley system of North and Middle Harbours are seen from within the Quarantine Station.

The place has strong or special association with a particular community or cultural group in New South Wales for social, cultural or spiritual reasons.

Aboriginal heritage

Aboriginal heritage values at North Head, including the Quarantine Station area, are important to the Aboriginal community in general, and to the local community especially for a wide range of reasons, social, cultural and spiritual. Aboriginal presence in the area is older than Sydney Harbour as it is known today. Port Jackson and Sydney Harbour have been the scene of some of the earliest fateful interactions between Aborigines and the British invaders. The surviving North Head Aboriginal sites are seen as symbolising Aboriginal history of recent centuries as well as earlier times. The area is one of the last within Sydney Harbour environment where Aboriginal heritage values have been retained in a physical setting that is substantially intact along with Dobroyd, Middle, Georges, Bradleys, South and Balls Heads; Mount Treffle at Nielsen Park; and the Hermitage Reserve. This environment allows the Aboriginal community to educate the younger and future generations as well as others about Aboriginal history, life styles and values and provides a chance of experiencing some of the atmosphere and quality of traditional Aboriginal life. Aspects of these spiritual and heritage values are embedded in or embodied by physical remains such as rock inscriptions, paintings, images or deposits with archaeological material remaining as evidence of past Aboriginal presence, but these are seen as an inseparable part of the present natural setting. Evidence of Aboriginal occupation has been recorded in more than forty locations in the North Head area.

European/Asian heritage

The Quarantine Station has strong associations for several groups in the community for social and cultural reasons. These associations include connections to the Aboriginal community, for whom the Quarantine Station is a component of the North Head/Manly area. This area has strong associations with previous Aboriginal ownership and use; with the impact of European settlement on the Aborigines; and through specific acts of Aboriginal resistance in the late 18th and early 19th centuries. North Head Quarantine Station also has associations with the former Quarantine Station staff, who worked on the station while it was an active quarantine; with former passengers subjected to quarantine, and their families (e.g. as exemplified by the Constitution memorial and family commemoration of their forebears' quarantine experience); and with the Manly community, as part of the wider North Head landscape, which has significantly contributed to the 'sense of place' of that community. The station also has significance to Asian immigrants or seamen who arrived in Australia and were retained at the Station. Many of these internees made their permanent home in Australia.

The place has potential to yield information that will contribute to an understanding of the cultural or natural history of New South Wales.

Aboriginal heritage

Aboriginal people have occupied the Sydney basin for at least 20,000 years. The Harbour has been a focus for Aboriginal habitation since its occupation over 6000 years ago. So much of the physical evidence of Aboriginal people's occupation of North Head is either undiscovered or lies outside the immediate North Head Quarantine Station Study Area. Many of the known sites have limited potential to yield new information due to the nature or state of physical preservation. However, given the limited capacity in this study for thorough archaeological assessment. It is possible that some sites or as yet undetected sites exist that might have greater potential to yield information that contributes to our understanding of Aboriginal occupation of the area.

European/Asian heritage

The surviving fabric of the place, both through its elements, components and sub-surface archaeological evidence, have considerable research value at a State level, with the potential to provide information on the operation of the Quarantine Station and of those in quarantine, and so to add to our knowledge of its history. The station is significant for its ability to educate the general public in its history.

Natural heritage

The area of North Head including the Quarantine Station is a remnant fragment containing once highly common vegetation types in the Sydney region. Many of these vegetation types and the wildlife they support are confined to disturbed remnants with the original vegetation having been cleared for urban and industrial development. Over 450 species of plants are found on North Head. Ninety species of native birds have been recorded in the Quarantine area including some species covered by international migratory bird agreements. The long period of "isolation" of North Head as a "tied island" initially allowed the species of flora and terrestrial fauna on the Head to evolve independently from those found elsewhere in the Sydney Basin. Although no longer tied, and now subject to the introduction of exotic flora and fauna, this early isolation has enhanced the value to science of the biodiversity on North Head. The response of plants and animals to periodic burning and periods without burning has potential to yield information important to the understanding of the natural history of the Hawkesbury Sandstone flora and fauna.

The place possesses uncommon, rare or endangered aspects of the cultural or natural history of New South Wales.

European/Asian heritage

The Quarantine Station, as NSW's primary quarantine facility for 166 years, held a unique place in the State's history, and its remarkably well preserved set of quarantine structures, landscape features and inscriptions make it a place of great rarity. The functions it fulfilled are no longer used to control quarantinable diseases, and the North Head Quarantine Station has the best representative collection of quarantine related buildings, equipment and human memorabilia [in the form of the inscriptions] of any Australian quarantine station. The moveable heritage associated with the Station; [and comprehensively documented by the NPWS] is of great cultural significance; particularly in situ within the Station. The Station is also significant in Australia's European and Asian history as being one of the few Australian sites taken into conservation ownership and management directly after its original function and use had been ended.

Natural heritage

Three species, one subspecies and populations of two other species are listed in schedules of the Threatened Species Conservation Act 1995. These species are the Little Penguin, Eudyptula minor (Schedule 1, endangered population, Manly); Long-nosed Bandicoot, Perameles nasuta (Schedule 1, endangered population North Head); the Sunshine Wattle, Acacia terminalis ssp terminalis (Schedule 1, endangered); Camfields Stringybark, Eucalyptus camfieldii (Schedule 2, vulnerable); the Powerful Owl, Ninox strenua (Schedule 2, vulnerable); and the Red-crowned Toadlet, Pseudophryne australis (Schedule 2, vulnerable). In addition to the threatened plant species there are over 450 other species of vascular plants and ferns representing 109 plant families. This level of genetic diversity if scientifically interesting and aesthetically pleasing. The endangered population of Little Penguin is significant as the only population of this species which breeds on the mainland of NSW. Thecharacteristics which have enabled this population to persist in one of the busiest commercial harbours in the world are interesting for scientific study. The endangered population of Long-nosed Bandicoot is also scientifically interesting as a remnant population of a species which was formerly common and widespread in the Sydney region. The few remaining trees of Camfields Stringybark are a significant component of the entire genetic resource of this vulnerable species.

The place is important in demonstrating the principal characteristics of a class of cultural or natural places/environments in New South Wales.

The Quarantine Station has the best collection of features in Australia reflecting the practise of quarantine, once operating at a number of stations around the nation. NSW had the first, and the last, operational quarantine station at North Head, and the surviving evidence at the station demonstrates many of the key milestones in quarantine development in this country. The moveable heritage of Quarantine Station is considerable in size, and has cultural significance in its own right.

== Gallery ==
Carvings at the quarantine station

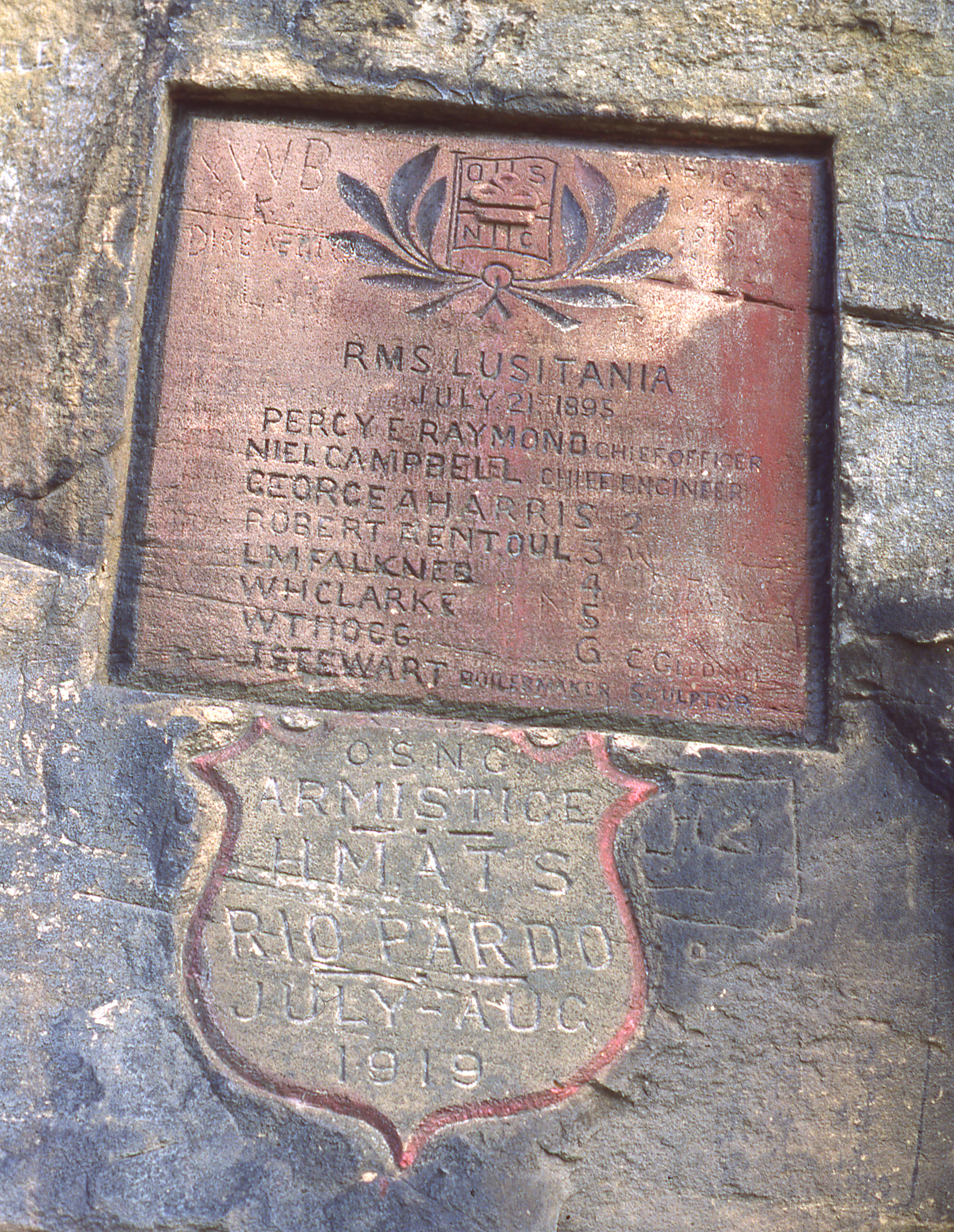

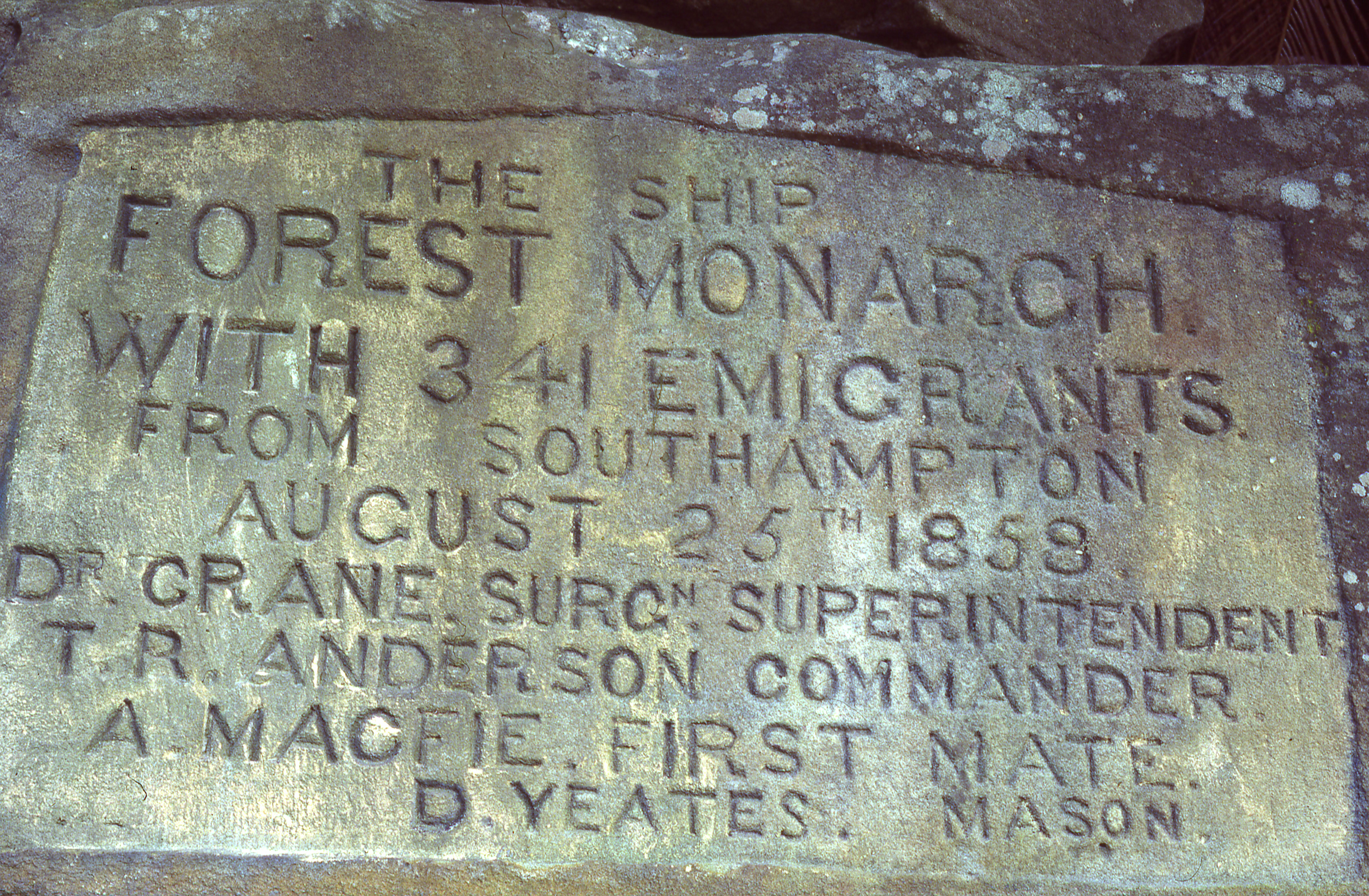

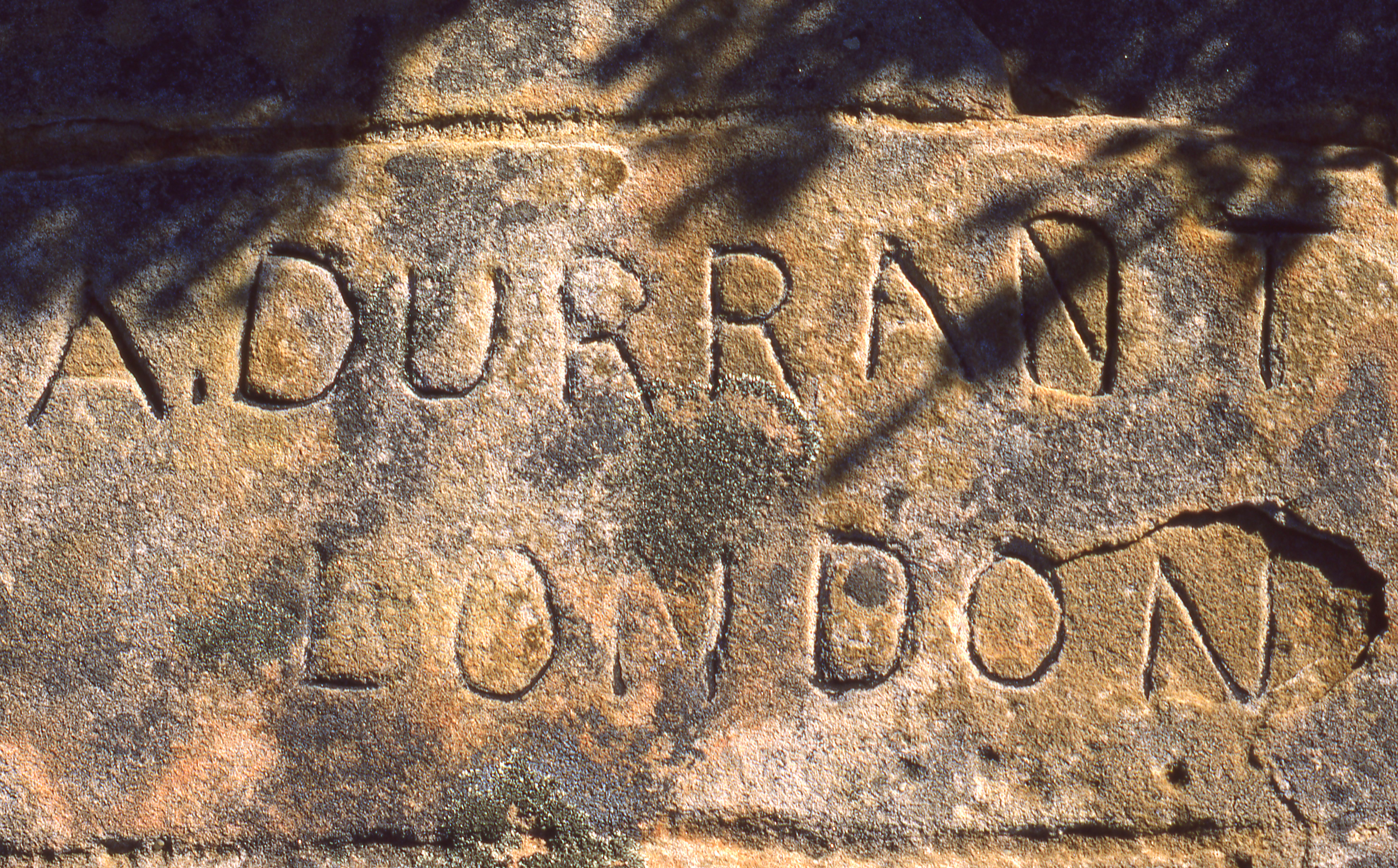

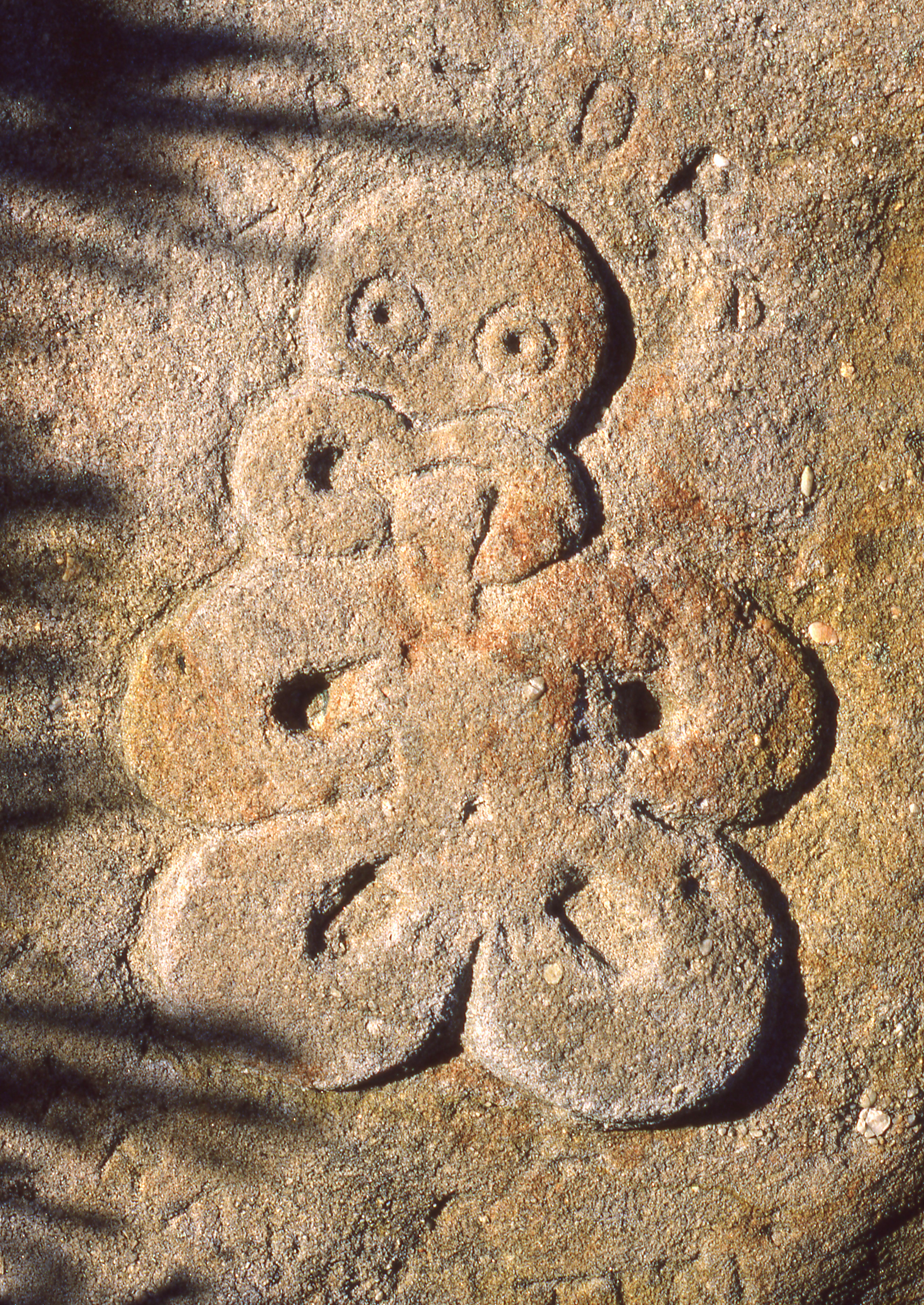

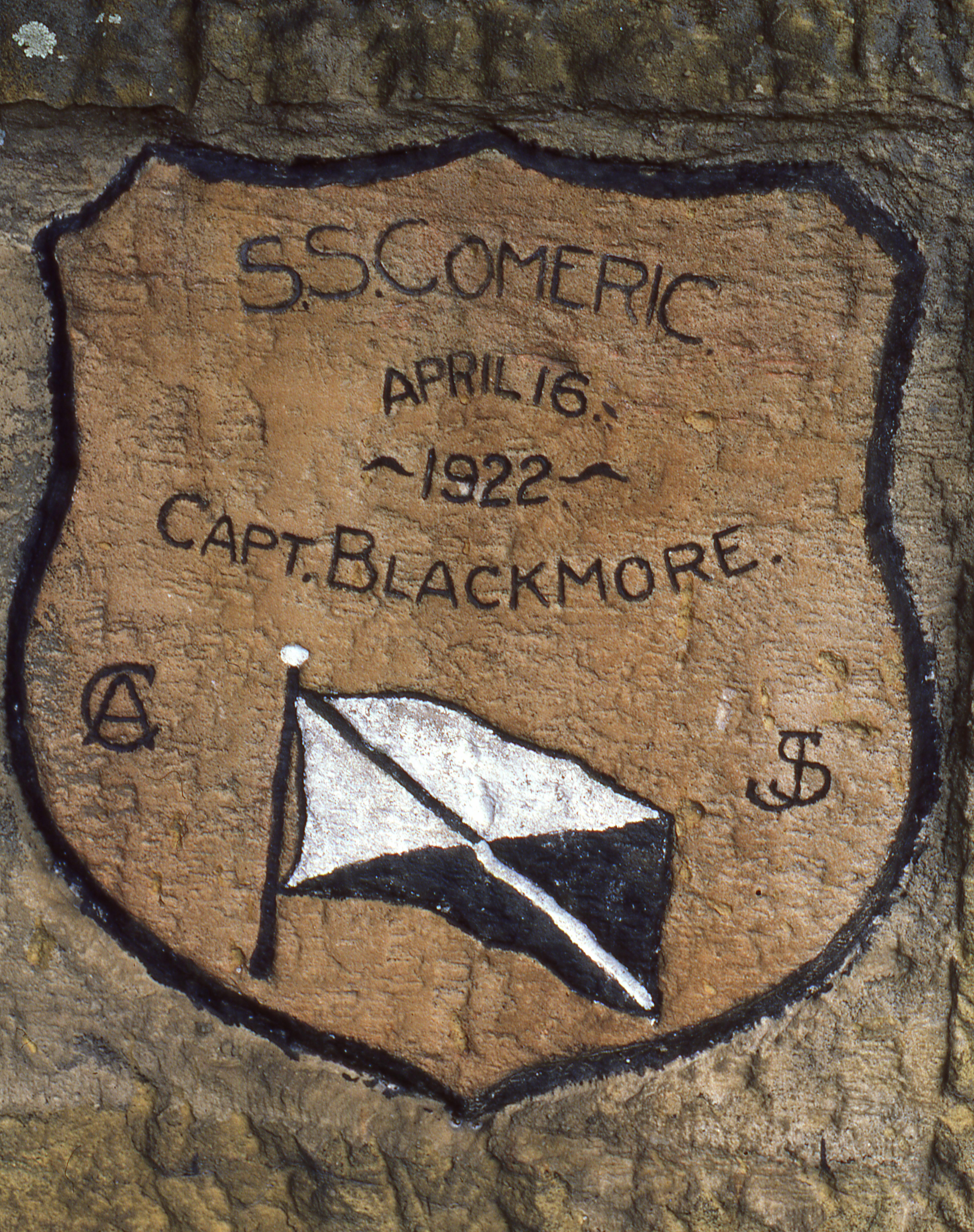
