= Martin Nolan =

Martin Nolan may refer to:

- Martin Nolan (journalist), American journalist
- Martin Nolan (judge) (born 1959), Irish judge
