= Patrick Nolan =

Patrick or Pat Nolan may refer to:

- Paddy Nolan (1862–1913), early Canadian lawyer
- Paddy Nolan (ice hockey) (1897–1957), 1920s Canadian ice hockey player
- Pat Nolan (born 1950), American lawyer
- Pat Nolan (hurler) (1937–2021), Irish hurler
- Patrick Joseph Nolan (1894–1984), Irish physicist
- Patrick Nolan (artistic director) (fl. 2000s–present), Australian director of Kura Tungar – Songs from the River (2004)
- Patrick Nolan (politician) (1881–1941), Canadian politician, mayor of Ottawa
