= Percy Nolan =

Australian politician (1886–1954)

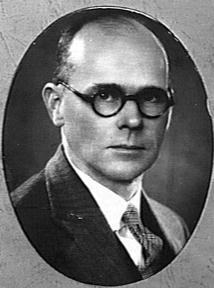

28th Mayor of Manly
- In office December 1935 – December 1938
- Deputy: Arthur Harcourt
- Preceded by: John Cross
- Succeeded by: Aubrey Hanson-Norman

Personal details
- Born: 1886 Colony of Queensland
- Died: 1954 (aged 67–68) Manly, New South Wales, Australia
- Spouse: Irene
- Relations: Sara Susan Nolan (mother); Rev James Nolan (father); Rev Howard Nolan (brother); Dr Herbert Russell Nolan (brother)
- Children: Two daughters
- Education: Newington College
- Occupation: Solicitor

Percy Leonard Nolan (1886 – 1954) was an Australian solicitor and mayor of Manly Council.

== Early life ==
Nolan was born in Queensland, the thirteenth child of Sara Susan (born Holme) and the Reverend James Adams Nolan. His father was a Methodist minister and in 1885 president of the NSW and Queensland Methodist Conference. His mother worked for temperance and women's suffrage and served as president of the Women's Christian Temperance Union.

After early years in Queensland, where his father was chairman of the Ipswich Methodist District, Nolan moved with his family to New South Wales. He attended Fort Street High School for one year and then Newington College from 1899 until 1902.

== Legal career ==
Nolan studied law and served articles with Reginald Cowlishaw, of Robson and Cowlishaw in Sydney. In 1908 he was admitted as a solicitor. He lived in Manly from 1918 and in 1922 he became a partner in the firm of Turner, Nolan & Company.

== Public office ==
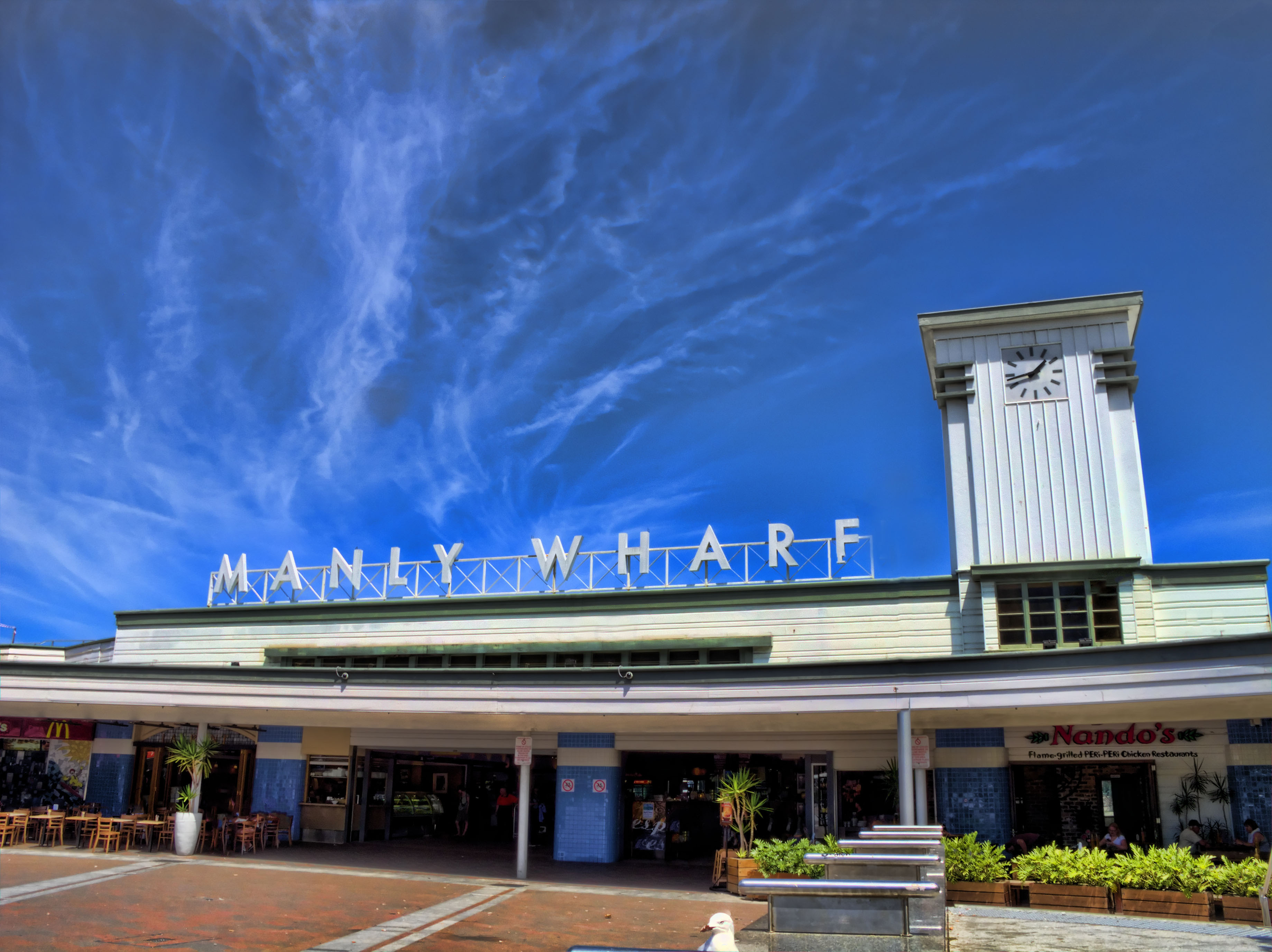
Nolan was active in convincing the state government to allow the rebuilding of Manly Wharf.

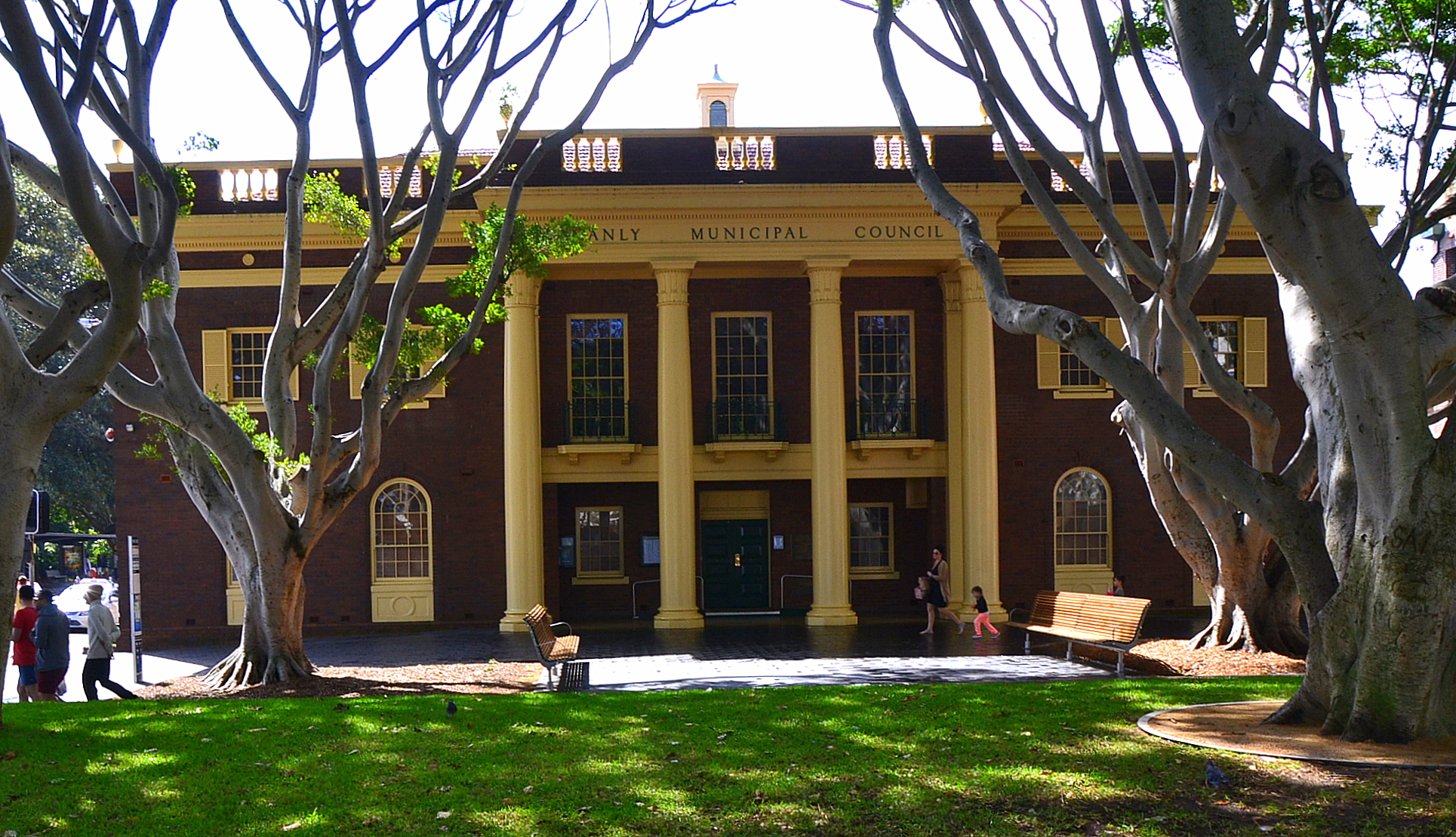
The foundation stone of Manly Council Chambers was laid by Nolan on 12 June 1937.

Nolan first served on Manly Council as an alderman in 1923. For three terms from 1936 he was Mayor of Manly and served in that role during the Diamond Jubilee celebrations of the council in 1937 and the Sesquicentennial celebrations of the white settlement of Sydney the following year. The Dobroyd Head scenic roadway, funded by the council, was opened during his mayoralty. The new Manly Town Hall and the Eric Andrew designed Surf Pavilion at South Steyne were also undertaken whilst he was mayor. The pavilion won the Sir John Sulman Medal but has since been demolished. During his term as mayor, he was active in convincing the state government to allow the rebuilding of harbour ferry wharf which stands to this day. For many years, Nolan pushed for the removal of the North Head Quarantine Station from Manly and called for its use as public open space. In 1924, Nolan was on the first board of the Manly Art Gallery and Museum and was a supporter of that unique municipal endeavour until his death. Just prior to his death on 3 June 1954 he received a certificate of merit from the Local Government Association of NSW for 25 years’ service to Manly Council. On his death at his residence in Margaret Street, Manly, he was survived by his wife, Irene, and daughters, Dorothy and Joyce. In 1955 Clontarf Road was renamed Nolan Place in his honour.

== Opinions ==
As a public figure, Nolan's views on various matters were often published and discussed. In 1936 he stated "that flats prevented the population increasing at the normal rate. People who lived in flats wanted motor cars, dancing, and picture shows rather than children." In 1938 he made national headlines when at the annual dinner of the Local Government Engineers' Association he reproved his hosts for not appearing in dinner jackets. He commented that few of them, although they were professional men, were wearing evening dress. "Clothes count ... they stamp the professional man as such, and I am surprised and disappointed that so few of you apparently realised this." As Mayor of Manly, Nolan wore the traditional black silk Geneva gown with purple velvet facings but believed he needed more ornamentation for the neck, so added a Jabot with seven cascades of lace foaming down from the collar.

== Portrait photographs ==
Photographic portraits of Nolan from 1925 until 1949 are held by Manly Public Library and are available on the National Library of Australia online database Trove.

Civic offices
Preceded by John Henry Cross	Mayor of Manly; 1935 – 1938	Succeeded by Aubrey Hanson–Norman
