= Jack Nolan =

Jack Nolan is the name of:

- Jack Nolan (actor), Irish actor
- Jack Nolan (Australian footballer) (1902–1971), Australian rules footballer
- Jack Nolan (English footballer) (born 2001), English footballer
- Jack Nolan (author) (born 1955) American author
