= Howard Nolan =

Australian Methodist minister

Rev. H. H. Nolan
- Born: 1865; New South Wales
- Died: 4 July 1931 (aged 65–66); Northbridge, New South Wales
- Education: Newington College and Wesleyan Theological Institution
- Spouse(s): Eliza (Lily) née Rabone (1863–1931)
- Children: 4 sons & 2 daughters
- Parent(s): Sarah Susan (née Holme) and the Rev James Adams Nolan
- Relatives: Dr Herbert Russell Nolan & Percy Nolan (brothers)
- Church: Methodist
- Ordained: 1890
- Congregations served: Croydon, Rockhampton, Townsville, Bundaberg and Toowong in Queensland; Kadavu, Levuka, Rewa and Bau in Fiji; Singleton, South Sydney Mission, Homebush, Lewisham and Willoughby in New South Wales
- Offices held: Secretary of Foreign Missions; Secretary of the NSW Conference.

Howard Henry Nolan (1865 – 4 July 1931) was an Australian Methodist minister. From 1908 until 1911 he was Conference Secretary of Foreign Missions and in 1928 and 1929 was elected as Secretary of the New South Wales Conference of Methodist Church of Australasia.

== Early life ==
Nolan was born in Richmond, New South Wales to Sara Susan (born Holme) and the Rev James Adams Nolan. His father was a Methodist minister and in 1885 president of the NSW and Queensland Methodist Conference. Sarah Susan Nolan worked for women's suffrage and served as president of the Women's Christian Temperance Union. He was the older brother of Percy Nolan. Nolan attended Newington College in the early 1880s.

== Architecture ==
Upon leaving Newington, Nolan served articles training to be an architect. Whilst he was stationed at Singleton, New South Wales as the minister he designed the new Methodist parsonage.

== Ministry ==
In 1888, Nolan chose service to the church over architecture and became a student at the Wesleyan Theological Institution which was then based in the grounds of Newington College. After ordination, his first station was Croydon, Queensland, from whence he went to Rockhampton, Queensland, Townsville, Queensland and Bundaberg, Queensland. In 1895, he volunteered for service in Fiji and remained there until 1907 when for health reasons he returned to Bundaberg. He then went to Brisbane and served in Toowong, Queensland. In 1912 he was transferred to Singleton, New South Wales and continued to serve in that state at South Sydney Mission, Homebush, Lewisham, and Willoughby. He was elected Secretary of the NSW Conference in 1928 and in 1930 he became a supernumerary.
