= Mary Nolan (disambiguation) =

Mary Nolan (1902–1948) was an American actress.

Mary Nolan may also refer to:

- Mary Nolan (politician) (born 1954), American Democratic politician
- Mary Nolan (artist) (1926–2016), Australian ceramicist, painter and photographer
- Mary A. Nolan (1842–1925), American suffragist
