= P. J. Nolan =

Irish hurler

Personal information
- Native name: P. S. Ó Nualáin (Irish)
- Born: 9 January 1987 (age 39) Askamore, County Wexford

Sport
- Sport: Hurling
Club
- Years: Club
- Askamore Kilrush
Inter-county
- Years: County
- 2006-present: Wexford
Inter-county titles
- All-Irelands: 0
- NHL: 1 (Div 2)
- All Stars: 0

P. J. Nolan (born 9 October 1987) is an Irish sportsperson. He plays hurling with his local club Askamore Kilrush and also plays hurling for the Wexford senior team.
