= Gary Nolan =

Gary Nolan may refer to:

- Gary Nolan (baseball) (born 1948), baseball player
- Gary Nolan (radio host) (born 1954), radio host
- Gary Nolan (rugby league) (born 1966), English rugby league player
- Gary Nolan (politician), American politician

== See also ==
- Garry Nolan, immunologist
