= Matthew Nolan =

Matthew or Matt Nolan may refer to:

- Matt Nolan, English drummer and artist
- M. J. Nolan (Matthew J. Nolan, born 1951), Irish Fianna Fáil politician
- Matthew Nolan (musician, born 1973), co-founder of 3epkano
- Matthew Nolan (musician, born 1999), member of Since September
- Matthew J.V. Nolan or Vincent Nolan, Irish police officer
- Matt Nolan, a contestant on Grease: You're the One That I Want!
- Matthew Nolan, character in the British TV series Red Eye
- Matthew Nolan, comics artist, co-author of Let's Talk About It
