= Martin Nolan (judge) =

Irish judge

Judge of the Circuit Court
- Incumbent
- Assumed office 21 May 2007
- Nominated by: Government of Ireland
- Appointed by: Mary McAleese

Personal details
- Born: 12 June 1959 (age 67) Wexford, Ireland
- Children: 4
- Education: Garda Síochána College; King's Inns

Martin Edward Nolan (born 12 June 1959) is an Irish judge who has served as a Judge of the Circuit Court since May 2007.

He sits as a judge presiding over the Dublin Circuit Criminal Court.

== Early life ==
Nolan grew up in County Wexford, playing Gaelic football for Oylegate–Glenbrien GAA and the Wexford minor (under-18) team.

Nolan was a member of the Garda Síochána from 1979 to 1989, based in Rathfarnham and Tallaght.

== Legal career ==
Nolan studied at the King's Inns and was called to the Bar in 1989. He worked in a mixed practice including criminal, civil and family law.

== Judicial career ==
He was nominated to the Circuit Court in May 2007, having practised as a barrister until his Circuit Court appointment. Judge Nolan has attracted criticism on social media for the perceived leniency of some of the sentences he has passed, particularly in the areas of Child Sexual Abuse Material or child sexual assault. An online petition to remove him from the bench attracted thousands of signatures. There was a "social media storm" after a case in which a group of men assaulted a woman and her partner with sticks and boiling water in 2021; one of the co-accused received a suspended sentence. In a 2023 Irish Times article, several criminal prosecution and defence lawyers defended Nolan's record. The piece said that he passes about 40 sentences a week, of which few are appealed by the Director of Public Prosecutions. It also commented that there is no centralised sentencing database in the Republic of Ireland that would allow for a proper comparison of sentences handed down by Judge Nolan with those of other judges.

== Personal life ==
Nolan's house has been burgled twice; on one occasion in 2015 he had to recuse himself from a case as the offender had previously been given a suspended sentence by Nolan. He is married and has four children.
