= Christopher Nolan (disambiguation) =

Christopher Nolan (born 1970) is a British-American filmmaker.

Chris or Christopher Nolan may also refer to:

- Chris Nolan (hurler) (born 1998), Irish hurler
- Christopher Nolan (author) (1965–2009), Irish poet and author
- Chris Nolan, Australian musician, founding member of the band Hush
