= Edward Nolan =

Edward Nolan may refer to:

- Edward Nolan (actor) (1888–1943)
- Edward Nolan (bishop) (1793-1837), Irish Roman Catholic bishop
- Eddie Nolan (born 1988), Irish footballer
- "The Only Nolan" (Edward Sylvester Nolan; 1857–1913), Canadian baseball player
- Edward Nolan (born 2008), English footballer
