= Richard Nolan (disambiguation) =

Rick Nolan (1943–2024) was an American politician in Minnesota.

Richard Nolan may also refer to

- Dick Nolan (American football) (1932–2007), American football player, father of Mike Nolan, former head coach of San Francisco 49ers
- Dick Nolan (musician) (1939–2005), Canadian singer, songwriter, and guitarist
- Richard Thomas Nolan (1937–2020), retired Episcopal clergyman, philosophy/religion professor, and author
- Richard J. Nolan (1848–1905), Medal of Honor recipient
- Richard C. Nolan (1910–1996), American football coach
- Richard L. Nolan (born c. 1940), American business school professor
