= Mark Edward Nolan =

American politician (1901–1967)

Mark Edward Nolan (November 15, 1901 – August 19, 1967) was an American lawyer and politician.

Nolan lived in Gilbert, St. Louis County, Minnesota and graduated from Gilbert High School. He graduated from the University of Notre Dame and taught at University of Notre Dame. Nolan practiced law in Gilbert, Minnesota. He served in the Minnesota House of Representatives in 1929 and 1930 and from 1933 to 1936. Nolan died in St. Louis County, Minnesota.
