= Jimmy Nolan =

Australian rules footballer

Personal information
- Full name: James Patrick Nolan
- Born: 11 August 1893; Garvoc, Victoria
- Died: 16 December 1973 (aged 80); Camberwell, Victoria
- Original team: Garvoc

Playing career^{1}
Years	Club	Games (Goals)
1911	Melbourne	1 (0)
- ^{1} Playing statistics correct to the end of 1911.

James Patrick Nolan (11 August 1893 – 16 December 1973) was an Australian rules footballer who played with Melbourne in the Victorian Football League (VFL).

== Family ==
Nolan was one of 16 children born to John and Bridget Nolan (née Curtis) of Garvoc. His eldest sister Margaret was murdered by Henry Morgan in what became known as the Panmure murder.
