= Paul Nolan =

Paul Nolan may refer to:

- Paul Alexander Nolan, Canadian actor
- Paul V. Nolan (1923–2009), member of the Tennessee House of Representatives
