= Frederick Nolan =

Frederick Nolan may refer to:

- Frederick Nolan (theologian) (1784–1864), Irish theologian
- Frederick Nolan (writer) (1931–2022), British writer
- Frederick G. Nolan (1927–2016), Canadian surveyor
- Fred Nolan (rugby league), Australian rugby league player
