= Philip Nolan =

Philip Nolan may refer to:

- Philip Nolan (Texas trader) (1771–1801), horse-trader and freebooter in 18th-century Texas
- Phillip Nolan (basketball) (born 1993), American college basketball player
- Philip Nolan (Neighbours), fictional character on the Australian soap opera Neighbours
- Philip Nolan, protagonist of "The Man Without a Country"
- Philip Nolan (professor), former Director General of Science Foundation Ireland and president of Maynooth University

== See also ==
- John Philip Nolan (1838–1912), Irish nationalist and politician
- Philip Francis Nowlan (1888–1940), American science fiction author
