= John Nolan (hurler) =

Irish hurler (born 1954)

Personal information
- Native name: Seán Ó Nualáin (Irish)
- Born: 1954 (age 71–72) New Ross, County Wexford
- Height: 5 ft 10 in (178 cm)

Sport
- Sport: Hurling
- Position: Goalkeeper
Club
- Years: Club
- 1970s-1990s: Geraldine O'Hanrahans
Inter-county
- Years: County
- 1975-1987: Wexford
Inter-county titles
- Leinster titles: 2
- All-Irelands: 0
- NFL: 0
- All Stars: 0

John Nolan (born 1954) is an Irish retired sportsperson. He played hurling with his local club Geraldine O'Hanrahan's and was a member of the Wexford senior inter-county team from 1975 until 1987.
