= Senator Nolan =

Senator Nolan may refer to:

- Dennis Nolan (politician) (born 1961), Nevada State Senate
- Howard C. Nolan Jr. (1932–2023), New York State Senate
- James Nolan (politician) (1901–1991), Alaska State and Territorial Senate
- Thomas M. Nolan (1916–1989), Pennsylvania State Senate

== See also ==
- Frank W. Nolen (born 1939), Virginia State Senate
- Senator Noland (disambiguation)
