= Keith Nolan =

Keith Nolan may refer to:

- Keith W. Nolan (1964–2009), American military historian
- Keith Nolan (golfer) (born 1973), Irish golfer
