= William Nolan =

William, Bill or Billy Nolan may refer to:

- William Nolan (bishop) (born 1954), Archbishop of Glasgow, Scotland
- William F. Nolan (1928–2021), American author of science fiction, fantasy and horror
- William I. Nolan (1874–1943), U.S. representative from Minnesota
- William T. Nolan (1887–1969), Canadian-born architect who worked in New Orleans, Louisiana
- Bill Nolan (animator) (1894–1954), Irish-American animated cartoon writer, animator, director, and artist
- Bill Nolan (footballer, born 1888) (1888–1916), Australian rules footballer for Richmond
- Bill Nolan (footballer, born 1927) (1927–2002), Australian rules footballer for Collingwood
- Bill Nolan (footballer, born 1929) (1929–2019), Australian rules footballer for South Melbourne
- Billy Nolan (character), antagonist in Stephen King's 1974 horror novel Carrie
- Billy Nolan (hurler) (born 1998), Irish hurler

== See also ==
- William A. Nolen, American surgeon and author
