= Leo Nolan (disambiguation) =

Leo Nolan (born 1972) is an American boxer.

Leo Nolan may also refer to:

- Leo Nolan (footballer) (1910–1993), Australian rules footballer
- Leo Nolan (wrestler) (1912–1979), New Zealand wrestler
