= Sara Susan Nolan =

English-born temperance reformer (1843–1927)

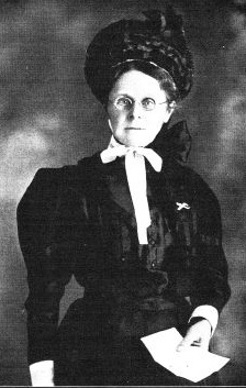
- Born: Sara Susan Holme; 25 December 1843; Manchester
- Died: 6 March 1927 (aged 83); Burwood
- Spouse: James Adams Nolan
- Children: 14

Sara Susan Nolan (25 December 1843 – 6 March 1927) was an English born temperance reformer in Sydney, Australia. She had joined the Woman's Christian Temperance Union (WCTU) in Brisbane but it was in Sydney that she became branch and later state and national President from 1906 to 1912.

== Life ==
Nolan was born in the Deansgate area of Manchester on Christmas Day in 1843. In 1849 she and her parents emigrated to Australia.

In Shoalhaven, on 15 March 1864, she and James Adams Nolan married. He was a Methodist minister and they had fourteen children. In 1885 they were living in Brisbane where she and her husband took an interest in the Woman's Christian Temperance Union. She joined the union there and after they returned to Sydney she joined the WCTU New South Wales branch and she soon became their colonial superintendent of legislation. Nolan bore a resemblance to Frances Willard and this may have assisted her rapid election as the branch President in 1893. She succeeded Euphemia Bowes who was elected honorary life president. Bowes had founded the branch and it had adopted a policy of also supporting women having the vote. Nolan supported the idea that women should gain the influence of having a vote but, in her opinion, this was to allow them to elect the best men.

Her husband died in 1904. In 1906 she was elected to be the National President of the WCTU and four years later she was in Glasgow at the World's W.C.T.U.'s convention as Australia's delegate. She stood down in 1912 as National President. She was noted at that time for her thoroughly researched and sometimes witty talks.

Nolan died in Burwood and seven of her children were still alive. Her son Howard Nolan was a leading Methodist minister and another child Percy Nolan would become the three times Mayor of Manly in the 1930s.
