= Joe Nolan (ice hockey) =

Canadian ice hockey player

- Born: March 21, 1929 Sault Ste. Marie, Ontario, Canada
- Died: September 29, 1986 (aged 57) Clinton, New York, USA
- Height: 6 ft 2 in (188 cm)
- Weight: 210 lb (95 kg; 15 st 0 lb)
- Position: Defence
- Shot: Right
- Played for: Johnstown Jets; Clinton Comets; Louisville Shooting Stars; Toledo Mercurys
- Playing career: 1951–1957

Joe Nolan (March 21, 1929 – September 29, 1986) was an ice hockey defenceman whose career spanned six seasons across two leagues.

== Playing career ==
Nolan started the 1955-56 season as a member of the Clinton Comets. On November 7, 1955, Nolan was signed by the Clinton Comets after defenceman Jim Johnson was waived from the team. Nolan finished the season leading the league in penalty minutes with 352 PIMs. Nolan's 352 PIMs were a league record and also marked the first time that a player accumulated over 300 penalty minutes in a season. Nolan's staggering penalty minutes gave him an unofficial reward for most individual penalty minutes in a season, which he won back to back years in 1955-1956 and 1956-1957.

On December 12, 1956, Nolan was released from the Clinton Comets. At the time, Nolan led the league in penalty minutes. Upon his release, Nolan was signed by the Johnstown Jets for whom he then appeared in only five playoff games before retiring.

== Acting career ==
Nolan retired from hockey in 1956, but returned to Johnstown, Pennsylvania two decades later in a minor role for the movie Slap Shot.

"Here's a name for you nostalgia fans: Clarence "Screaming Buffalo" Swamptown. I'll never forget an exclusive interview in which Swamptown revealed that he calls his hockey stick the 'Big Tomahawk,' and he usually refers to the opposing players as 'the little scalps.'"

— Jim Carr, Charlestown Chiefs play-by-play announcer describing Clarence Swamptown, the character that was played by Joe Nolan in Slap Shot

Nolan assumed the role of Clarence "Screaming Buffalo" Swamptown, a player who Chiefs players thought "was suspended forever" until he was introduced at the Federal League championship game. In real life, Nolan was not suspended for life - or at all - due to misconduct. Some of the promotional material for Slap Shot, specifically statements made by the Carlson brothers and Dave Hanson, suggested that Nolan had been banned for life from pro hockey "for some reason." Nolan was investigated for gambling, but was not suspended. If he had been suspended for life as the promotional material stated, he would have been ineligible to work as an official, which he did for a number of years after his retirement.

== Personal ==
Nolan was a full-blooded Ojibwa Indian. He came from a large family of four brothers and five sisters, the son of Clement and Veronica Nolan.

Upon retiring from the EHL, Nolan returned to Clinton, New York to reside, but eventually came back to the Eastern Hockey League as a linesman who was respected by players. Nolan continued to reside there until his death in 1986.
