= Tom Nolan (hurler) =

Irish hurler

Personal information
- Nickname: Tomásin

Sport
- Sport: Hurling
- Position: midfield
Club
- Years: Club
- 1940s-1960s: Crotta O'Neill's
Club titles
- Kerry titles: 6
Inter-county
- Years: County
- 1940s-1950s: Kerry
Inter-county titles
- Munster titles: 0
- All-Irelands: 0

Tom (Tomásin) Nolan (born Clandouglas, Lixnaw, County Kerry) was a hurler from County Kerry. He played with the Kerry and the Crotta O'Neill's club.

Nolan was at his best at midfield during Crotta's glorious period in the 1940s and early 1950s. During that time Crotta O'Neill's were one of the strongest sides in Kerry hurling. He won six Kerry Senior Hurling Championships. Nolan won the first of his County Championship medals in 1943, when Crotta, defeated Kenmare in the final. The Crotta team went on to complete three-in-a-row in 1944 and 1945 and took further titles in 1947, 1950 and 1951, with Nolan at mid-field in five of the victories. He was captain in 1950 and '51 teams. Nolan went on to play in further county finals in 1952 and 1957 but Crotta were defeated in both. Nolan was a central figure in most of the Crotta teams that reigned supreme, winning eight county titles between 1939 and 1951. He and his fellow Kerryman Frank Kissane (Ardfert's 1949 winning captain) both played in the Limerick Senior Hurling Championship when they were brought in as 'guest' for Tournafulla. They later went on to win the Limerick Championship for the club.

He played his hurling with many of the greats in Ireland at the time, including Christy Ring, Willie John Daly, Josie Hartnett, the Kennys of Tipperary, Paddy, Sean and Phil, Tommy and John Doyle and Limerick's Jackie Power.

In retirement, he served Crotta on the sideline as manager. He had five sons Todd, Cyril, Kieran, Pascal and Dominick all served Crotta and Kerry with Todd, who also played with Munster.
