= Frankie Nolan =

Irish hurler

Personal information
- Native name: Proinsias Ó Nualláin (Irish)
- Born: Francis Nolan; 1950 Patrickswell, County Limerick, Ireland
- Height: 5 ft 8 in (173 cm)

Sport
- Sport: Hurling
- Position: Forward
Club
- Years: Club
- Patrickswell
Inter-county
- Years: County
- 1971-1983: Limerick
Inter-county titles
- Munster titles: 3
- All-Irelands: 1
- All Stars: 0

Frankie Nolan (born 1950) is a former Irish sportsperson. He played hurling with his local club Patrickswell and with the Limerick senior inter-county team in the 1970s. He won an All Ireland medal in 1973 and was on the losing side n the final in 1974. He has the distinction of opening the scoring, with points from play, in both finals. He won three Munster Medals in 73,74 and 81, as a sub.

== Career statistics ==
Team	Year	National League			Munster		All-Ireland		Total	
Team	Year	Division	Apps	Score	Apps	Score	Apps	Score	Apps	Score
Limerick	1970-71	Division 1A	x	0-01	0	0-00	—		x	0-01
Limerick	1971-72	Division 1A	x	0-01	0	0-00	—		x	0-01
Limerick	1972-73	Division 1A	x	5-08	2	2-02	2	0-03	x	7-13
Limerick	1973-74	Division 1A	x	1-09	2	1-01	1	0-01	x	2-11
Limerick	1974-75	Division 1A	x	1-05	2	0-05	—		x	1-10
Limerick	1975-76	Division 1B	x	1-00	0	0-00	—		x	1-00
Limerick	1976-77	Division 1A	x	0-00	1	0-00	—		x	0-00
Limerick	1977-78	Division 1B	x	0-00	2	0-02	—		x	0-02
Limerick	1978-79	Division 1A	x	0-00	x	0-00	—		x	0-00
Limerick	1979-80	Division 1A	x	0-00	x	0-00	x	0-00	x	0-00
Limerick	1980-81	Division 1A	x	0-00	x	0-00	2	0-02	x	0-02
Limerick	1981-82	Division 1B	x	x-xx	x	0-00	—		x	x-xx
Limerick	1982-83	Division 2	x	x-xx	1	0-01	—		x	x-xx
Limerick	1983-84	Division 1	x	x-xx	x	0-00	—		x	x-xx
Limerick	1984-85	Division 1	x	x-xx	x	0-00	—		x	x-xx
Career total			x	x-xx	x	3-11	x	0-06	x	x-xx
