= Mick Nolan (Gaelic footballer) =

Irish Gaelic footballer

Personal information
- Native name: Micheál Ó Nualláin (Irish)
- Born: Portlaoise, County Laois, Ireland

Sport
- Sport: Gaelic football
- Position: Goalkeeper
Club
- Years: Club
- 1999-present: Portlaoise
Inter-county
- Years: County
- 2002-present: Laois
Inter-county titles
- Leinster titles: 1

Michael Nolan is a Gaelic footballer from County Laois, Ireland.

He plays for the Portlaoise club. He plays as a goalkeeper for Laois and in 2003 was part of the Laois squad that won the Leinster Senior Football Championship title for the first time since 1946.

Nolan emerged on to the scene in 2000 as part of the Laois minor team and in 2002 and 2003 he was part of the Laois Under 21 team.

In 2006, Nolan opted off the Laois senior squad as understudy to first choice goalkeeper, Fergal Byron but 2007 saw his return to the squad under new manager Liam Kearns.
