= Electoral results for the district of Manly =

Election results for Manly, New South Wales, Australia

Manly, an electoral district of the Legislative Assembly in the Australian state of New South Wales, has had one incarnation, from 1927 to the present.

== Members for Manly ==
Election	Member	Party
1927	Alfred Reid	Nationalist
1930	Alfred Reid	Nationalist
1932	Alfred Reid	United Australia
1935	Alfred Reid	United Australia
1938	Alfred Reid	United Australia
1941	Alfred Reid	United Australia
1944	Alfred Reid	Independent Democrat
1945 by	Douglas Darby	Liberal
1947	Douglas Darby	Liberal
1950	Douglas Darby	Liberal
1953	Douglas Darby	Liberal
1956	Douglas Darby	Liberal
1959	Douglas Darby	Liberal
1962	Douglas Darby	Independent Liberal
1965	Douglas Darby	Independent Liberal
1968	Douglas Darby	Liberal
1971	Douglas Darby	Liberal
1973	Douglas Darby	Liberal
1976	Douglas Darby	Liberal
1978	Alan Stewart	Labor
1981	Alan Stewart	Labor
1984	David Hay	Liberal
1988	David Hay	Liberal
1991	Peter Macdonald	Independent
1995	Peter Macdonald	Independent
1999	David Barr	Independent
2003	David Barr	Independent
2007	Mike Baird	Liberal
2011	Mike Baird	Liberal
2015	Mike Baird	Liberal
2017 by	James Griffin	Liberal
2019	James Griffin	Liberal
2023	James Griffin	Liberal

== Election results ==
=== Elections in the 2020s ===
==== 2023 ====
2023 New South Wales state election: Manly
Party	Candidate	Votes	%	±%
Liberal	James Griffin	23,764	45.0	−7.6
Independent	Joeline Hackman	14,365	27.2	+27.2
Labor	Jasper Thatcher	6,794	12.9	−5.4
Greens	Terry Le Roux	4,734	9.0	−9.4
Independent	Phillip Altman	1,395	2.6	+2.6
Animal Justice	Bailey Mason	1,062	2.0	−0.4
Sustainable Australia	Emanuele Paletto	711	1.3	−1.7
Total formal votes		52,825	97.8	+0.1
Informal votes		1,189	2.2	−0.1
Turnout		54,014	88.5	−0.9
Notional two-party-preferred count
Liberal	James Griffin	27,679	62.5	−2.1
Labor	Jasper Thatcher	16,592	37.5	+2.1
Two-candidate-preferred result
Liberal	James Griffin	25,541	54.8	−8.3
Independent	Joeline Hackman	21,027	45.2	+45.2
Liberal hold				

=== Elections in the 2010s ===
==== 2019 ====
2019 New South Wales state election: Manly
Party	Candidate	Votes	%	±%
Liberal	James Griffin	25,418	52.61	−15.39
Greens	Kristyn Glanville	9,137	18.91	+1.78
Labor	Natasha Phillips-Mason	8,619	17.84	+4.95
Keep Sydney Open	Dane Murray	2,456	5.08	+5.08
Sustainable Australia	Emanuele Paletto	1,502	3.11	+3.11
Animal Justice	Kate Paterson	1,184	2.45	+2.45
Total formal votes		48,316	97.85	−0.02
Informal votes		1,061	2.15	+0.02
Turnout		49,377	88.69	−1.03
Two-party-preferred result
Liberal	James Griffin	27,239	64.70	−13.70
Labor	Natasha Phillips-Mason	14,859	35.30	+13.70
Two-candidate-preferred result
Liberal	James Griffin	26,628	62.90	−11.62
Greens	Kristyn Glanville	15,706	37.10	+11.62
Liberal hold		Swing	−11.62	

==== 2017 by-election ====
2017 Manly by-election Saturday 8 April
Party	Candidate	Votes	%	±%
Liberal	James Griffin	18,775	43.8	−24.2
Independent	Kathryn Ridge	9,332	21.8	+21.8
Greens	Clara Williams Roldan	7,855	18.4	+1.2
Independent	Ron Delezio	2,375	5.5	+5.5
Voluntary Euthanasia	Kerry Bromson	1,087	2.5	+2.5
Animal Justice	Ellie Robertson	946	2.2	+2.2
Independent	Haris Jackman	767	1.8	+1.8
Christian Democrats	Annie Wright	759	1.8	+0.9
Independent	John Cook	306	0.7	+0.7
	Brian Clare	294	0.7	+0.7
Independent	W Bush	208	0.5	+0.5
	Victor Waterson	123	0.3	+0.3
Total formal votes		42,827	97.4	−0.5
Informal votes		1,143	2.6	+0.5
Turnout		43,970	79.8	−9.9
Two-candidate-preferred result
Liberal	James Griffin	20,187	60.5	−14.0
Independent	Kathryn Ridge	13,158	39.5	+39.5
Liberal hold		Swing	N/A	

Mike Baird (Liberal) resigned.

==== 2015 ====
2015 New South Wales state election: Manly
Party	Candidate	Votes	%	±%
Liberal	Mike Baird	32,160	68.0	−2.2
Greens	Clara Williams Roldan	8,103	17.1	−0.7
Labor	Jennifer Jary	6,098	12.9	+2.5
No Land Tax	Rod Jamieson	517	1.1	+1.1
Christian Democrats	Annie Wright	420	0.9	−0.8
Total formal votes		47,298	97.9	+0.6
Informal votes		1,031	2.1	−0.6
Turnout		48,329	89.7	+2.6
Notional two-party-preferred count
Liberal	Mike Baird	33,426	78.4	+1.4
Labor	Jennifer Jary	9,209	21.6	−1.4
Two-candidate-preferred result
Liberal	Mike Baird	32,848	74.5	−2.5
Greens	Clara Williams Roldan	11,233	25.5	+2.5
Liberal hold		Swing	−2.5	

==== 2011 ====
2011 New South Wales state election: Manly
Party	Candidate	Votes	%	±%
Liberal	Mike Baird	30,212	70.2	+25.1
Greens	Ian Hehir	7,656	17.8	+8.1
Labor	Jennifer Jary	4,469	10.4	+0.6
Christian Democrats	Timothy Wainwright	718	1.7	+0.3
Total formal votes		43,055	97.7	−0.4
Informal votes		1,018	2.3	+0.4
Turnout		44,073	91.2	+0.6
Notional two-party-preferred count
Liberal	Mike Baird	31,874	82.4	+10.6
Labor	Jennifer Jary	6,821	17.6	−10.6
Two-candidate-preferred result
Liberal	Mike Baird	30,923	77.0	+23.7
Greens	Ian Hehir	9,219	23.0	+23.0
Liberal hold		Swing	+23.7	

=== Elections in the 2000s ===
==== 2007 ====
2007 New South Wales state election: Manly
Party	Candidate	Votes	%	±%
Liberal	Mike Baird	18,284	45.1	+4.2
Independent	David Barr	12,655	31.2	−0.8
Labor	Daniel Pearce	3,981	9.8	−3.1
Greens	Sarah Weate	3,931	9.7	+1.2
Independent	Penelope Wynne	660	1.6	+1.6
Christian Democrats	Wally Vanderpoll	573	1.4	+0.4
AAFI	Neil Hamilton	443	1.1	−0.6
Total formal votes		40,527	98.1	+0.1
Informal votes		805	1.9	−0.1
Turnout		41,332	90.6	
Notional two-party-preferred count
Liberal	Mike Baird	20,854	71.8	+7.5
Labor	Daniel Pearce	8,184	28.2	−7.5
Two-candidate-preferred result
Liberal	Mike Baird	19,263	53.4	+4.6
Independent	David Barr	16,842	46.6	−4.6
Liberal gain from Independent		Swing	+4.6	

==== 2003 ====
2003 New South Wales state election: Manly
Party	Candidate	Votes	%	±%
Liberal	Jean Hay	15,939	41.0	+2.3
Independent	David Barr	12,969	33.4	+3.2
Labor	Hugh Zochling	4,762	12.3	−4.5
Greens	Keelah Lam	3,231	8.3	+3.1
Independent	Mark Norek	718	1.8	+1.8
AAFI	David Prior	673	1.7	+0.9
Christian Democrats	Marjorie Moffitt	366	0.9	+0.9
Unity	John Yuen	179	0.5	−0.3
Total formal votes		38,837	98.1	+0.2
Informal votes		763	1.9	−0.2
Turnout		39,600	90.3	
Notional two-party-preferred count
Liberal	Jean Hay	17,741	64.8	+5.4
Labor	Hugh Zochling	9,616	35.2	−5.4
Two-candidate-preferred result
Independent	David Barr	17,623	51.3	+0.0
Liberal	Jean Hay	16,753	48.7	-0.0
Independent hold		Swing	+0.0	

=== Elections in the 1990s ===
==== 1999 ====
1999 New South Wales state election: Manly
Party	Candidate	Votes	%	±%
Liberal	Darren Jones	15,424	38.7	−6.2
Independent	David Barr	12,005	30.2	−4.0
Labor	David de Montfort	6,705	16.8	+1.2
Greens	Judy Lambert	2,054	5.2	+5.2
One Nation	Christine Ferguson	1,595	4.0	+4.0
Democrats	Antony Howells	1,004	2.5	−0.4
Outdoor Recreation	Peter Stitt	347	0.9	+0.9
Unity	Chris Wong	337	0.8	+0.8
AAFI	Peter Ecroyd	335	0.8	+0.2
Total formal votes		39,806	97.9	+1.1
Informal votes		869	2.1	−1.1
Turnout		40,675	92.4	
Notional two-party-preferred count
Liberal	Darren Jones	17,671	59.4	−4.0
Labor	David de Montfort	12,069	40.6	+4.0
Two-candidate-preferred result
Independent	David Barr	17,408	51.3	+1.9
Liberal	Darren Jones	16,553	48.7	−1.9
Independent gain from Independent		Swing	+1.9	

The sitting member Peter Macdonald (Independent) did not contest the election.

==== 1995 ====
1995 New South Wales state election: Manly
Party	Candidate	Votes	%	±%
Liberal	David Oldfield	15,343	44.5	−1.2
Independent	Peter Macdonald	13,092	38.0	+3.0
Labor	Brian Green	4,666	13.5	−2.2
Democrats	Peter Dee	877	2.5	−1.1
Call to Australia	John Swan	516	1.5	+1.5
Total formal votes		34,494	96.9	+3.3
Informal votes		1,117	3.1	−3.3
Turnout		35,611	93.8	
Two-candidate-preferred result
Independent	Peter Macdonald	16,676	50.4	−0.3
Liberal	David Oldfield	16,433	49.6	+0.3
Independent hold		Swing	−0.3	

==== 1991 ====
1991 New South Wales state election: Manly
Party	Candidate	Votes	%	±%
Liberal	David Hay	14,768	45.7	−15.8
Independent	Peter Macdonald	11,294	34.9	+34.9
Labor	Ivan Hurwitz	5,097	15.8	−16.7
Democrats	Jane King	1,177	3.6	−2.5
Total formal votes		32,336	93.6	−3.4
Informal votes		2,212	6.4	+3.4
Turnout		34,548	92.1	
Two-candidate-preferred result
Independent	Peter Macdonald	15,707	50.7	+50.7
Liberal	David Hay	15,278	49.3	−15.6
Independent gain from Liberal		Swing	+50.7	

=== Elections in the 1980s ===
==== 1988 ====
1988 New South Wales state election: Manly
Party	Candidate	Votes	%	±%
Liberal	David Hay	16,388	57.6	+7.0
Labor	Gregory Smith	9,686	34.1	−7.6
Democrats	Matthew Leigh-Jones	2,367	8.3	+5.1
Total formal votes		28,441	96.9	−0.8
Informal votes		903	3.1	+0.8
Turnout		29,344	92.0	
Two-party-preferred result
Liberal	David Hay	17,227	62.2	+7.7
Labor	Gregory Smith	10,466	37.8	−7.7
Liberal hold		Swing	+7.7	

==== 1984 ====
1984 New South Wales state election: Manly
Party	Candidate	Votes	%	±%
Liberal	David Hay	14,772	50.7	+4.1
Labor	Alan Stewart	12,156	41.7	−7.2
Independent	Joan Cooke	1,015	3.5	+3.5
Democrats	Robert Leys	945	3.2	+3.2
Independent	Margaret Lee	266	0.9	+0.9
Total formal votes		29,154	97.7	+0.1
Informal votes		674	2.3	−0.1
Turnout		29,828	91.1	+1.8
Two-party-preferred result
Liberal	David Hay		54.5	+5.7
Labor	Alan Stewart		45.5	−5.7
Liberal gain from Labor		Swing	+5.7	

==== 1981 ====
1981 New South Wales state election: Manly
Party	Candidate	Votes	%	±%
Labor	Alan Stewart	14,034	48.9	−2.5
Liberal	Nelson Meers	13,358	46.6	+2.9
Independent	Patricia Langworthy	1,284	4.5	+4.5
Total formal votes		28,676	97.6	
Informal votes		700	2.4	
Turnout		29,376	89.3	
Two-party-preferred result
Labor	Alan Stewart	14,600	51.2	−2.6
Liberal	Nelson Meers	13,893	48.8	+2.6
Labor hold		Swing	−2.6	

=== Elections in the 1970s ===
==== 1978 ====
1978 New South Wales state election: Manly
Party	Candidate	Votes	%	±%
Labor	Alan Stewart	14,670	51.4	+9.1
Liberal	George Ashley	12,489	43.7	−14.0
Democrats	John McGruer	948	3.3	+3.3
Independent	Anthony Dorney	460	1.6	+1.6
Total formal votes		28,567	97.7	−0.1
Informal votes		678	2.3	+0.1
Turnout		29,245	91.1	−0.7
Two-party-preferred result
Labor	Alan Stewart	15,374	53.8	+11.5
Liberal	George Ashley	13,193	46.2	−11.5
Labor gain from Liberal		Swing	+11.5	

==== 1976 ====
1976 New South Wales state election: Manly
Party	Candidate	Votes	%	±%
Liberal	Douglas Darby	16,760	57.7	+2.6
Labor	Marc Gumbert	12,301	42.3	+12.3
Total formal votes		29,061	97.8	+0.2
Informal votes		656	2.2	−0.2
Turnout		29,717	91.8	+1.2
Liberal hold		Swing	−5.7	

==== 1973 ====
1973 New South Wales state election: Manly
Party	Candidate	Votes	%	±%
Liberal	Douglas Darby	14,231	55.1	−3.9
Labor	Allan Hughes	7,755	30.0	−1.8
Australia	John Alexander	2,912	11.3	+11.3
Democratic Labor	Bernard Fox	940	3.6	−3.8
Total formal votes		25,838	97.6	
Informal votes		637	2.4	
Turnout		26,475	90.6	
Two-party-preferred result
Liberal	Douglas Darby	16,278	63.0	−2.8
Labor	Allan Hughes	9,560	37.0	+2.8
Liberal hold		Swing	−2.8	

==== 1971 ====
1971 New South Wales state election: Manly
Party	Candidate	Votes	%	±%
Liberal	Douglas Darby	14,688	59.0	−9.8
Labor	Terence Riley	7,919	31.8	+5.5
Democratic Labor	Francis Bulger	1,830	7.4	+4.2
Independent	Eric Riches	446	1.8	+1.2
Total formal votes		24,883	97.7	
Informal votes		583	2.3	
Turnout		25,466	90.8	
Two-party-preferred result
Liberal	Douglas Darby	16,375	65.8	−6.4
Labor	Terence Riley	8,508	34.2	+6.4
Liberal hold		Swing	−6.4	

=== Elections in the 1960s ===
==== 1968 ====
1968 New South Wales state election: Manly
Party	Candidate	Votes	%	±%
Liberal	Douglas Darby	16,426	68.8	+32.8
Labor	Daniel Dwyer	6,287	26.3	+26.3
Democratic Labor	Ann Macken	771	3.2	+3.2
Independent	Vincent Rizner	232	1.0	+1.0
Independent	Eric Riches	152	0.6	+0.6
Total formal votes		23,868	96.5	
Informal votes		863	3.5	
Turnout		24,731	93.4	
Two-party-preferred result
Liberal	Douglas Darby	17,235	72.2	+31.1
Labor	Daniel Dwyer	6,633	27.8	+27.8
Member changed to Liberal from Independent Liberal		Swing	N/A	

==== 1965 ====
1965 New South Wales state election: Manly
Party	Candidate	Votes	%	±%
Independent Liberal	Douglas Darby	13,728	53.9	+5.0
Liberal	Barton Higgs	9,175	36.0	−4.0
Independent	Albert Thompson	2,563	10.1	+10.1
Total formal votes		25,466	98.0	+0.7
Informal votes		531	2.0	−0.7
Turnout		25,997	92.2	−0.9
Two-candidate-preferred result
Independent Liberal	Douglas Darby	15,010	58.9	+3.0
Liberal	Barton Higgs	10,456	41.1	−3.0
Independent Liberal hold		Swing	+3.0	

==== 1962 ====
1962 New South Wales state election: Manly
Party	Candidate	Votes	%	±%
Independent Liberal	Douglas Darby	12,049	48.9	+48.9
Liberal	Harry Boyle	9,874	40.0	−23.1
Independent	John Gillmer	2,743	11.1	+11.1
Total formal votes		24,666	97.3	
Informal votes		694	2.7	
Turnout		25,360	93.1	
Two-candidate-preferred result
Independent Liberal	Douglas Darby	13,799	55.9	+55.9
Liberal	Harry Boyle	10,867	44.1	−19.0
Member changed to Independent Liberal from Liberal		Swing	N/A	

=== Elections in the 1950s ===
==== 1959 ====
1959 New South Wales state election: Manly
Party	Candidate	Votes	%	±%
Liberal	Douglas Darby	15,078	63.1	
Labor	Geoffrey Mill	8,803	36.9	
Total formal votes		23,881	98.4	
Informal votes		395	1.6	
Turnout		24,276	92.8	
Liberal hold		Swing		

==== 1956 ====
1956 New South Wales state election: Manly
Party	Candidate	Votes	%	±%
Liberal	Douglas Darby	13,646	67.9	+5.3
Labor	John Wilson	6,462	32.1	−5.3
Total formal votes		20,108	97.1	−1.2
Informal votes		589	2.9	+1.2
Turnout		20,697	94.4	+1.5
Liberal hold		Swing	+5.3	

==== 1953 ====
1953 New South Wales state election: Manly
Party	Candidate	Votes	%	±%
Liberal	Douglas Darby	12,583	62.6	
Labor	Malcolm Stuart-Robertson	7,512	37.4	
Total formal votes		20,095	98.3	
Informal votes		346	1.7	
Turnout		20,441	92.9	
Liberal hold		Swing		

==== 1950 ====
1950 New South Wales state election: Manly
Party	Candidate	Votes	%	±%
Liberal	Douglas Darby	13,985	74.5	
Independent Liberal	Charles Scharkie	4,779	25.5	
Total formal votes		18,764	96.4	
Informal votes		700	3.6	
Turnout		19,464	92.6	
Liberal hold		Swing		

=== Elections in the 1940s ===
==== 1947 ====
1947 New South Wales state election: Manly
Party	Candidate	Votes	%	±%
Liberal	Douglas Darby	17,345	63.2	+40.0
Labor	Cedric Cahill	10,101	36.8	+0.2
Total formal votes		27,446	98.9	+1.8
Informal votes		300	1.1	−1.8
Turnout		27,746	95.2	+4.2
Liberal hold		Swing	+6.0	

==== 1945 by-election ====
1945 Manly by-election Saturday 15 September
Party	Candidate	Votes	%	±%
Liberal	Douglas Darby	9,901	45.9	+22.7
Labor	Aubrey Hanson-Norman	9,160	42.5	+8.9
Soldiers' party	James Dunn	2,516	11.7	
Total formal votes		21,577	98.7	+1.6
Informal votes		276	1.3	−1.6
Turnout		21,853	81.5	−9.5
Two-party-preferred result
Liberal	Douglas Darby	11,339	55.6	
Labor	Aubrey Hanson-Norman	10,238	47.4	
Liberal gain from Independent Democrat		Swing	N/A	

Alfred Reid (Independent Democrat turned Liberal) died.

==== 1944 ====
1944 New South Wales state election: Manly
Party	Candidate	Votes	%	±%
Labor	James Dunn	8,286	36.6	+2.5
Independent Democrat	Alfred Reid	7,561	33.4	+33.4
Democratic	Stephen Slack	5,246	23.2	−24.7
Liberal Democratic	Eric White	1,556	6.9	+6.9
Total formal votes		22,649	97.1	−1.1
Informal votes		670	2.9	+1.1
Turnout		23,319	91.0	+0.6
Two-candidate-preferred result
Independent Democrat	Alfred Reid	12,962	57.2	+57.2
Labor	James Dunn	9,687	42.8	+2.7
Member changed to Independent Democrat from United Australia		Swing	N/A	

- Alfred Reid had been elected at the previous election as a UAP member, however he was not pre-selected by the Democratic Party and held the seat as an Independent Democratic candidate.

==== 1941 ====
1941 New South Wales state election: Manly
Party	Candidate	Votes	%	±%
United Australia	Alfred Reid	10,483	47.9	
Labor	James Dunn	7,470	34.1	
Independent	Vincent Brady	3,942	18.0	
Total formal votes		21,895	98.2	
Informal votes		390	1.8	
Turnout		22,285	90.4	
Two-party-preferred result
United Australia	Alfred Reid	13,124	59.9	
Labor	James Dunn	8,771	40.1	
United Australia hold		Swing		

=== Elections in the 1930s ===
==== 1938 ====
1938 New South Wales state election: Manly
Party	Candidate	Votes	%	±%
United Australia	Alfred Reid	13,538	57.4	−16.4
United Australia	Robert Miller	6,589	27.9	+27.9
Independent	Richard Fitzgerald	2,491	10.6	+10.6
United Australia	Alfred Seller	956	4.1	+4.1
Total formal votes		23,574	97.0	+6.3
Informal votes		729	3.0	−6.3
Turnout		24,303	95.8	+0.5
United Australia hold		Swing	N/A	

- Preferences were not distributed.

==== 1935 ====
1935 New South Wales state election: Manly
Party	Candidate	Votes	%	±%
United Australia	Alfred Reid	14,167	73.8	−2.7
Ind. United Australia	Ernest Kidd	5,023	26.2	+26.2
Total formal votes		19,190	90.7	−6.7
Informal votes		1,956	9.3	+6.7
Turnout		21,146	95.3	−1.3
United Australia hold		Swing	N/A	

==== 1932 ====
1932 New South Wales state election: Manly
Party	Candidate	Votes	%	±%
United Australia	Alfred Reid	14,316	76.5	+25.0
Independent	Clarence Pullen	4,391	23.5	+23.5
Total formal votes		18,707	97.4	−0.7
Informal votes		497	2.6	+0.7
Turnout		19,204	96.6	+1.4
United Australia hold		Swing	N/A	

==== 1930 ====
1930 New South Wales state election: Manly
Party	Candidate	Votes	%	±%
Nationalist	Alfred Reid	9,332	51.5	
Labor	Samuel Bendeich	5,670	31.3	
Australian	Charles Gourlay	2,136	11.8	
Ind. Nationalist	Vincent Brady	977	5.4	
Total formal votes		18,115	98.1	
Informal votes		356	1.9	
Turnout		18,471	95.2	
Nationalist hold		Swing		

=== Elections in the 1920s ===
==== 1927 ====
1927 New South Wales state election: Manly
Party	Candidate	Votes	%	±%
Nationalist	Alfred Reid	8,319	63.3	
Labor	Jack White	2,782	21.2	
Ind. Nationalist	Francis Corkery	2,031	15.5	
Total formal votes		13,132	98.9	
Informal votes		1e9	1.1	
Turnout		13,271	82.7	
Nationalist win		(new seat)		
