= 1945 Manly state by-election =

Election result for Manly, New South Wales, Australia

A by-election was held in the state electoral district of Manly on 15 September 1945. The by-election was triggered by the death of Alfred Reid (Independent Democrat turned Liberal).

== Dates ==
| Date | Event |
|---|---|
| 5 August 1945 | Alfred Reid died |
| 21 August 1945 | Writ of election issued by the Speaker of the Legislative Assembly |
| 31 August 1945 | Nominations |
| 15 September 1945 | Polling day |
| 29 September 1945 | Return of writ |

== Candidates ==
- Douglas Darby (Liberal) was the founder of the British Orphans' Adoption Society, a member of the United Nations Relief and Rehabilitation Association
- James Dunn (Soldiers' party) was the former Labor candidate for Manly, but was defeated for pre-selection by Hanson-Norman
- Aubrey Hanson-Norman (Labor) was a former mayor of Manly

== Result ==
1945 Manly by-election Saturday 15 September
| Party | Candidate | Votes | % | ±% |
|---|---|---|---|---|
| Liberal | Douglas Darby | 9,901 | 45.9 | +22.7 |
| Labor | Aubrey Hanson-Norman | 9,160 | 42.5 | +8.9 |
| Soldiers' party | James Dunn | 2,516 | 11.7 | |
| Total formal votes | | 21,577 | 98.7 | +1.6 |
| Informal votes | | 276 | 1.3 | −1.6 |
| Turnout | | 21,853 | 81.5 | −9.5 |
Two-party-preferred result
| Liberal | Douglas Darby | 11,339 | 55.6 | |
| Labor | Aubrey Hanson-Norman | 10,238 | 47.4 | |
| Liberal gain from Independent Democrat | | Swing | N/A | |

== See also ==
- Electoral results for the district of Manly
- List of New South Wales state by-elections
