= Manly Town Hall =

Council chambers in Sydney, Australia

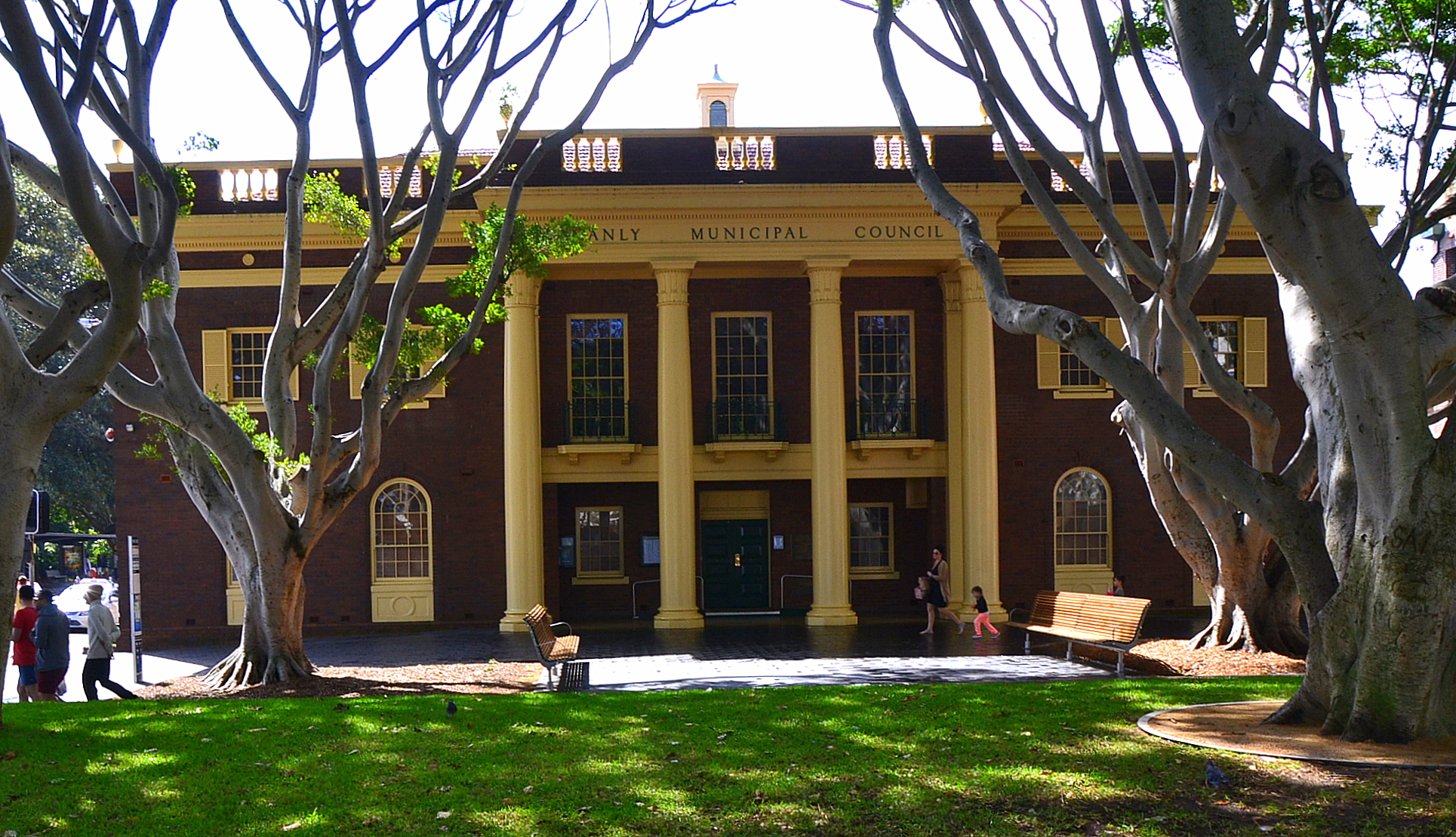
- Manly Town Hall in 2013
- Former names: Llangollen

General information
- Status: Completed
- Type: Government town hall
- Architectural style: Georgian revival; Inter-war Stripped Classical; with Egyptian Revival features
- Location: The Corso, Gilbert & Belgrave Streets, Manly, New South Wales, Australia
- Coordinates: 33°47′54″S 151°17′06″E
- Construction started: 12 June 1937
- Completed: 1937
- Client: Manly Municipal Council
- Owner: Northern Beaches Council (current)

Design and construction
- Architect: Samuel Reginald Maisey
- Architecture firm: Trenchard Smith & Maisey
- Main contractor: Stuart Bros

New South Wales Heritage Database (Local Government Register)
- Official name: Civic Buildings - Council Town Hall Admin. Building, Police Station & Court House
- Type: Complex / Group
- Criteria: a., c., d., g.
- Designated: 5 April 2013
- Reference no.: Local register
- Group collection: Government and Administration
- Category: Council Chambers

The Manly Town Hall is a landmark civic building in Manly, a suburb of Sydney, New South Wales, Australia. The building is located at the junction of The Corso, Gilbert Street and Belgrave Street, opposite Manly ferry wharf. Designed in the Inter-war Stripped Classical style with Egyptian Revival style columns by Samuel Reginald Maisey, it replaced the previous town hall on the site, a Victorian Mansion built in 1879. The Town Hall was the seat of Manly Council from 1937 to 2016, when it became the site of the first meeting of the new Northern Beaches Council.

== History ==
=== First town hall ===
The original building, Llangollen, as Manly Town Hall in 1919.

The original building on this site was a Victorian mansion known as Llangollen, which was built in 1879 as the residence of William Howard Rolfe (1818–1879), a prominent landowner and member of the Manly community. While Rolfe did not live long enough to reside there, the Rolfe Family lived there until it became a branch of the Australian Joint Stock Bank and was finally purchased in 1909 by Manly Municipal Council. Manly Council, which had been incorporated in 1877, had been meeting in temporary premises including the original Ivanhoe Hotel in Ivanhoe Park, until 1909, and from then on Llangollen served as the new council chambers. However the size and style of the building was too small and unsuited to the needs of the council, despite the mansion having been purchased for the sum of £5000.

For many years a debate raged over the construction of a new Town Hall at the present site. In May 1911 the mayor, Alderman James Bonner, passed through council a resolution that asked the council to "take into consideration the advisability of calling tenders for competitive designs for a Town Hall, to be erected on the present site." In July 1912, the council appointed a sub-committee to examine the details of such a project, but found its firm opposition from Alderman Adam Ogilvy, who clashed in council with Alderman Ellison Quirk.

In 1919, when Council proposed its first post-war loan for major public works, the new Town Hall was quickly eliminated as a project and by 1921 a protest committee headed by Alderman Ogilvy, conducted a successful campaign against any proposal, demanding that a referendum be held before any money was spent on such a project. The council committee also consulted the NSW President of the Institute of Architects, Sir Charles Rosenthal on the matter of the project. By May 1924, council established a competition for the design, to be administered by Rosenthal. A referendum was held in conjunction with the 1925 Council elections. Two propositions were put, for a new £40,000 Town Hall on the current site or £15,000 for a new Council Hall and offices and ‘making provision for an Art Gallery’ in front of the existing building. Both were heavily defeated.

In 1928 the Council again moved for a new competition for designs of a new Town Hall, which in May 1928 was won by the firms of Fowell and McConnel, Architects Hodges and Watts, who were asked to collaborate on an amended design. Their vision, costed at around £60,000, sparking a new debate and lambasted as 'pretentious', was rejected at another referendum in June 1928. However opinion within the council was still firmly of the opinion that a new hall was needed. In August 1930, the Town Clerk of Manly, Les Wellings, having recently returned from an official visit to the recently built Newcastle City Hall, noted in his report that the "construction of a similar imposing building at the front door of Manly would give a tremendous impetus to the town."

=== Second town hall ===
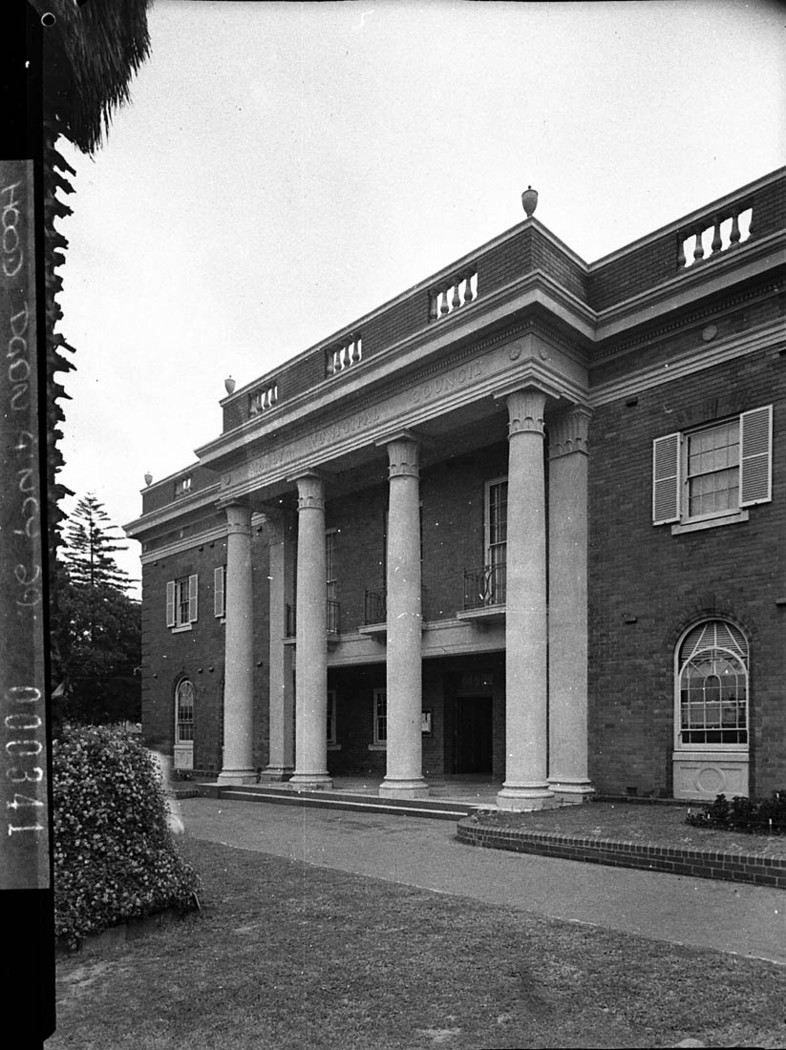
The portico of Manly Town Hall by Sam Hood, November 1937.

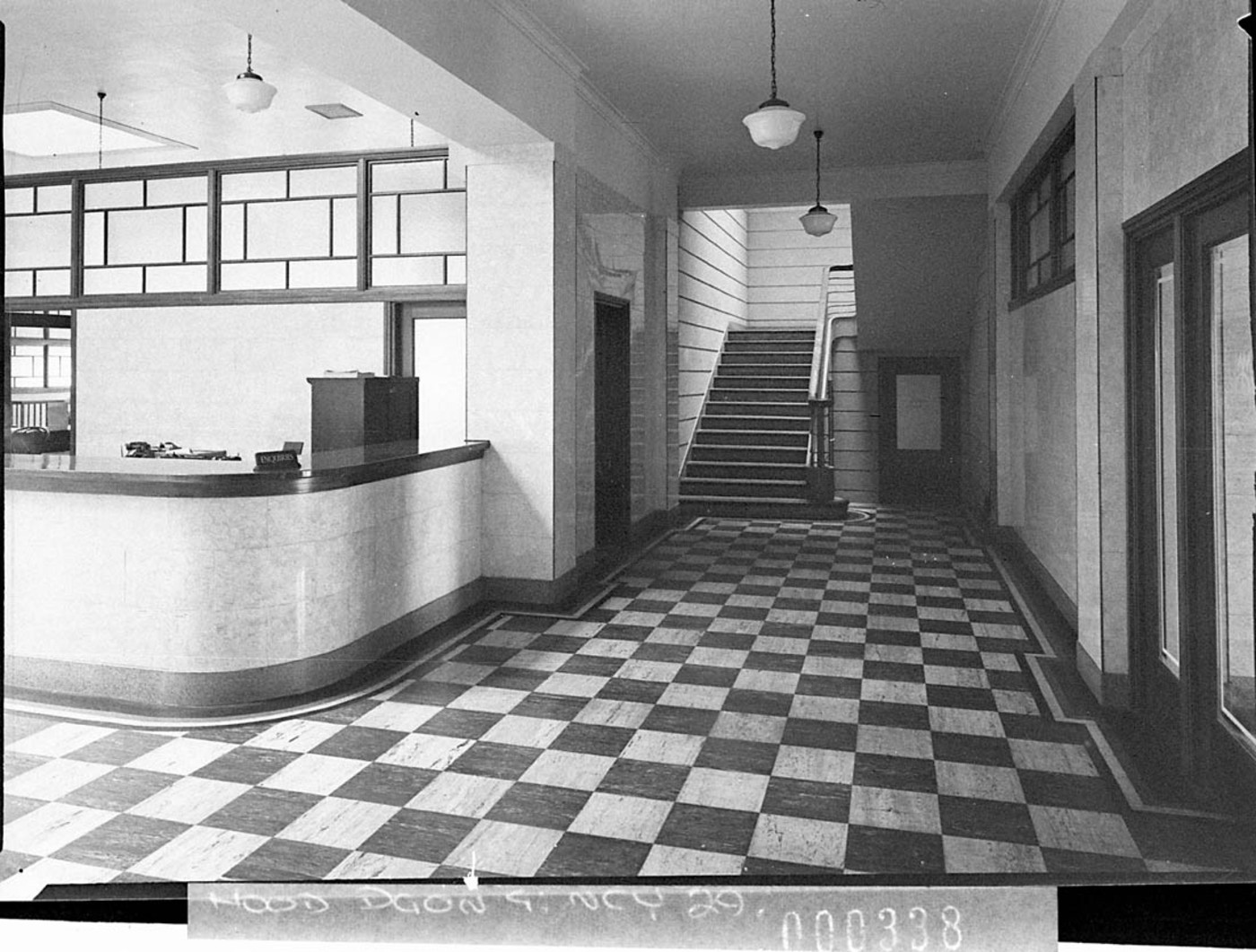
Entrance hall of Manly Town Hall by Sam Hood, November 1937.

In July 1936, with the council's 60th anniversary jubilee only a year away, the council made the decision to restart efforts for the construction of a new town hall. During the council debate, Alderman Hanson Norman, who stood opposed to a new town hall, said nevertheless that the "present building was in a bad state of disrepair, it gave insufficient space for the staff, and this was a handicap in efficient administration."

The Mayor, Alderman Percy Nolan, noted that "the present building was a disgrace" and the motion was carried five votes to four. By February 1937 the old Town Hall had been demolished and an Inter-war Stripped Classical design (with Egyptian Revival style columns) by Samuel Reginald Maisey of the prominent local firm Trenchard Smith & Maisey was chosen.

On 12 June, marking the council's 60th anniversary, Alderman Nolan laid the foundation stone for the new Town Hall, which followed a tree-planting ceremony by former mayor Arthur T. Keirle. A subsequent article in the Sydney Morning Herald noted that the new hall "will be a noticeable addition to the architecture of the suburb. Two storeys in height, the front, designed after the colonial style, is impressive. Four pillars, rising to parapet height, flank the main entrance. The rest of the exterior maintains the same imposing appearance."

In 1965 extensions to the Council chambers at the rear of the Town Hall were completed on 30 September and were unveiled by Mayor William R. Nicholas and Deputy Mayor David Hay. With the amalgamation of Manly Council into the new Northern Beaches Council on 12 May 2016, the town hall was the site of the first meeting of the new council on 19 May, presided over by Administrator Dick Persson.

== See also ==
- List of town halls in Sydney
- Architecture of Sydney
