= Jean Hay =

Australian local government politician

Jean Hay AM

53rd Mayor of Manly
- In office 11 September 1999 – 27 March 2004
- Deputy: Julie Heraghty
- Preceded by: Sue Sacker
- Succeeded by: Peter Macdonald
- In office 13 September 2008 – 12 May 2016
- Deputy: David Murphy; Richard Morrison; Alan Le Surf; Adele Heasman; Steve Pickering; James Griffin
- Preceded by: Peter Macdonald
- Succeeded by: Dick Persson (Administrator)

Alderman of the Manly Municipal Council
- In office September 1987 – 1 July 1993

Councillor of Manly Council
- In office 1 July 1993 – 11 September 1999
- In office 27 March 2004 – 13 September 2008

Personal details
- Born: Jean Frances Arthurson; 1940 (age 85–86) Manly, New South Wales, Australia
- Party: Liberal Party
- Spouse: David Hay (m. 1958)
- Children: 1 Son and 2 Daughters
- Education: Cremorne Girls High School

Jean Frances Hay AM (née Arthurson; born 1940) is an Australian local government politician. She served as the Mayor of Manly Council from 1999 to 2004 and was the last mayor of Manly from 8 September 2008 to 12 May 2016, following Manly's amalgamation into the new Northern Beaches Council.

== Early life and family ==
Born Jean Frances Arthurson in Manly in 1940, Arthurson grew up in Manly and attended Cremorne Girls High School. On 1 March 1958, Arthurson married NSW Liberal politician David Hay and had one son and two daughters. In 2009 Hay, while serving as mayor, was diagnosed with breast cancer but by 2011 was declared cancer-free.

== Local government career ==
Hay was first elected to the Manly Municipal Council in September 1987 and was first elected Mayor from 1999 to 2004. In the 1998 Queen's Birthday Honours List, Hay was made a Member of the Order of Australia (AM) for "service to the Manly community through local government, community action and sporting groups, and as a fundraiser for welfare and health education programmes." On 1 January 2001 Hay was also awarded the Centenary Medal for "outstanding community service as mayor and councillor of Manly".

At the 2003 NSW state election, Hay stood as the Liberal candidate for her local seat of Manly against the sitting independent member, David Barr. Although Hay gained a majority of the primary vote on 41%, second preference flows were significant enough to ensure Barr was re-elected on a 51-48% two party-preferred margin. When the sitting Independent mayor, Dr. Peter Macdonald, announced he would not recontest the mayoral position ahead of the 2008 Local Government Elections, Hay stood again for the position and was elected with 37% of the vote. Hay was re-elected at the 2012 elections with a greatly increased 48.9% of the mayoral vote. From 8 July 2013, the Minister for Sustainability, Environment, Water, Population and Communities, Tony Burke, appointed Hay to the Sydney Harbour Federation Trust governing board of trustees, a Commonwealth Government body that works to preserve and rehabilitate a number of defence and other Commonwealth lands in and around Sydney Harbour, succeeding the vacancy created by former North Sydney mayor Genia McCaffery.

With the 2015 review of local government boundaries by the NSW Government Independent Pricing and Regulatory Tribunal, which recommended that Manly, Pittwater and Warringah merge to form one single council, Hay led efforts within Manly Council to oppose amalgamation. The government eventually considered three proposals. The first, which was supported by Hay, proposed a merger of Manly and Mosman councils and parts of Warringah to form a new council with an area of 49 square kilometres (19 sq mi) and support a population of approximately 153,000. The second proposed a merger of Pittwater Council and parts of Warringah to form a new council with an area of 214 square kilometres (83 sq mi) and support a population of approximately 141,000. The third, proposed by Warringah Council on 23 February 2016, was for an amalgamation of the Pittwater, Manly and Warringah councils. In response to Warringah's proposal, Hay noted that "Manly Council’s services cater to the particular demographic needs and character of the Manly area; This would be lost in the model of an amalgamated council that is being proposed by Warringah." By April 2016, Hay had made an expression of interest to serve in the new council, whichever proposal that would be, commenting that "I have been the longest serving councillor and mayor and I’d like to play a role in the transition council, I feel as though I have something to offer."

== Northern Beaches Council ==
On 12 May 2016, with the release of the Local Government (Council Amalgamations) Proclamation 2016, the Northern Beaches Council was formed, in line with Warringah's proposal, from Manly, Pittwater and Warringah councils. At the first meeting of the new council at Manly Town Hall on 19 May, Hay was appointed by Administrator Dick Persson as the Chair of the Implementation Advisory Group, one of several advisory committees composed of former councillors and mayors of the three councils, and as Chair of the Social Committee.

Although Hay had seriously considered running for the new council at the elections scheduled for September 2017, in April 2017 she announced that she would not be running again. This was due to severe retinopathy that was a side-effect of the chemotherapy she underwent to remove breast cancer several years before. On 5 April 2017, the Minister for the Environment and Energy, Josh Frydenberg, appointed Hay as Deputy Chair of the Sydney Harbour Federation Trust, serving until 1 July 2021.

Civic offices
Preceded by Sue Sacker	Mayor of Manly; 1999 – 2004	Succeeded by Peter Macdonald
Preceded by Peter Macdonald	Mayor of Manly; 2008 – 2016	Succeeded by Dick Persson as Administrator of Northern Beaches Council
