= 2017 Manly state by-election =

Election result for Manly, New South Wales, Australia

- 8 April 2017
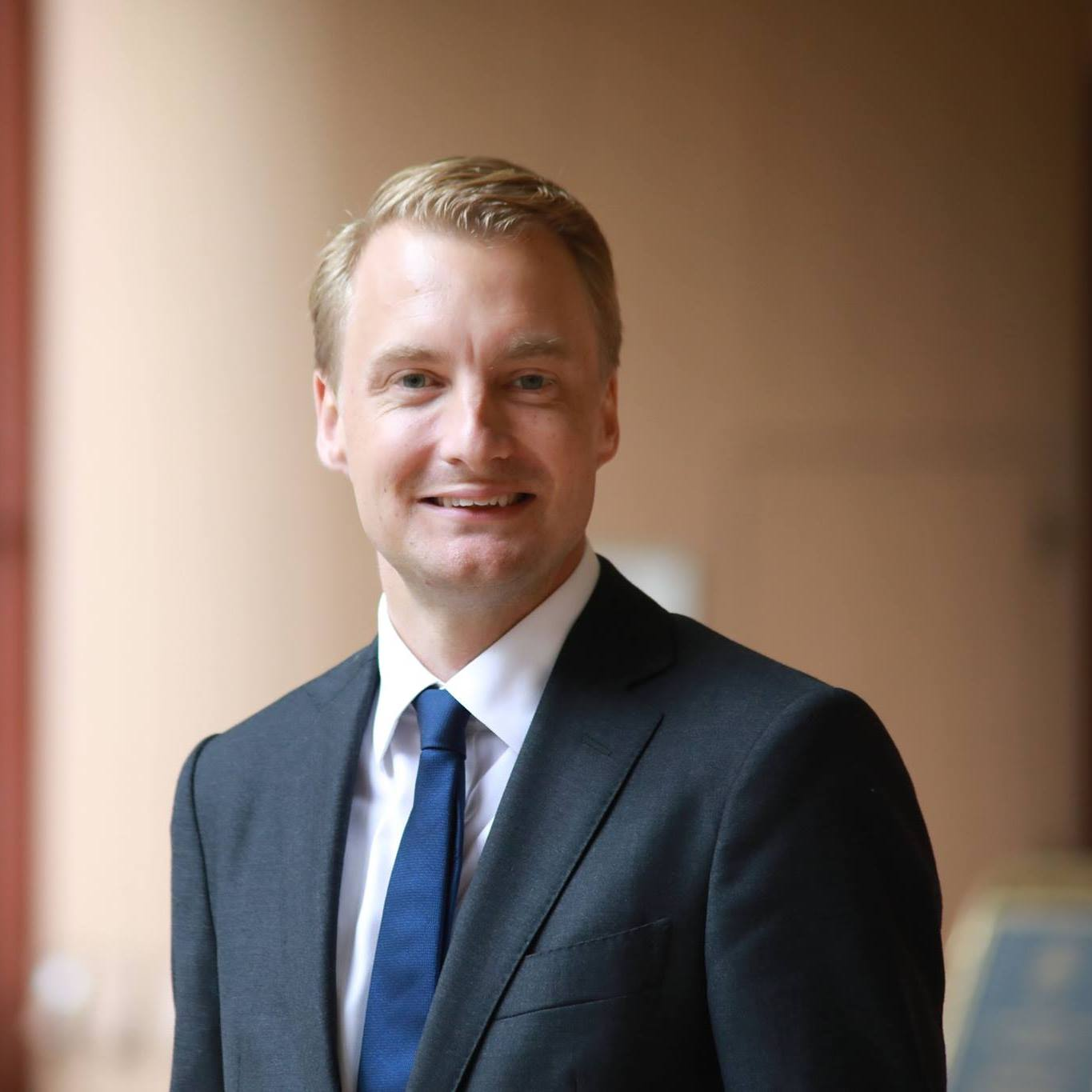

| | First party | Second party | Third party |
|---|---|---|---|
| | | IND |
| Candidate | James Griffin | Kathryn Ridge | Clara Williams Roldan |
| Party | Liberal | Independent | Greens |
| Popular vote | 18,775 | 9,332 | 7,855 |
| Percentage | 43.8% | 21.8% | 18.4% |
| Swing | ▼24.2pp | ▲21.8pp | ▲1.2pp |
| TPP | 60.5% | 39.5% |
| TPP swing | ▼14.0pp | ▲39.5pp |
MP before election
Mike Baird
Liberal
Elected MP
James Griffin
Liberal

A by-election was held in the state electoral district of Manly on 8 April 2017. The by-election was triggered by the resignation of Mike Baird (Liberal) after he also resigned as Premier of New South Wales. It was held on the same day as the North Shore and Gosford state by-elections.

== Dates ==
| Date | Event |
|---|---|
| 17 March 2017 | Writ of election issued by the Speaker and close of electoral rolls |
| Noon, 22 March 2017 | Close of nominations for party-endorsed candidates |
| Noon, 23 March 2017 | Close of nominations for other candidates |
| 8 April 2017 | Polling day, between the hours of 8 am and 6 pm |

== Candidates ==
The candidates in ballot paper order are as follows:

Candidate nominations
| Party | Candidate | Notes (not on ballot paper) |
|---|---|---|
| Independent | Haris Jackman | |
| Independent | John Cook | |
| Voluntary Euthanasia Party | Kerry Bromson | |
| Christian Democratic Party (Fred Nile Group) | Annie Wright | "pro-family, pro-marriage and pro-life policies". |
| Greens | Clara Williams Roldan | Previously ran against Mike Baird in the 2015 state election and also in the federal seat of Warringah against former Prime Minister Tony Abbott in 2016. |
| Liberal Party | James Griffin | Former Deputy Mayor of Manly won Liberal preselection after defeating Walter Villatora. |
| Independent | Brian Clare | |
| Independent | Ron Delezio | Activist and father of Sophie Delezio. |
| Independent | Kathryn Ridge | Environmental lawyer. She cited former Independent Manly MPs Peter Macdonald and David Barr as inspirations. |
| Independent | Victor Waterson | |
| Independent | W Bush | |
| Animal Justice Party | Ellie Robertson | |

== Results ==
2017 Manly by-election Saturday 8 April
| Party | Candidate | Votes | % | ±% |
|---|---|---|---|---|
| Liberal | James Griffin | 18,775 | 43.8 | −24.2 |
| Independent | Kathryn Ridge | 9,332 | 21.8 | +21.8 |
| Greens | Clara Williams Roldan | 7,855 | 18.4 | +1.2 |
| Independent | Ron Delezio | 2,375 | 5.5 | +5.5 |
| Voluntary Euthanasia | Kerry Bromson | 1,087 | 2.5 | +2.5 |
| Animal Justice | Ellie Robertson | 946 | 2.2 | +2.2 |
| Independent | Haris Jackman | 767 | 1.8 | +1.8 |
| Christian Democrats | Annie Wright | 759 | 1.8 | +0.9 |
| Independent | John Cook | 306 | 0.7 | +0.7 |
| | Brian Clare | 294 | 0.7 | +0.7 |
| Independent | W Bush | 208 | 0.5 | +0.5 |
| | Victor Waterson | 123 | 0.3 | +0.3 |
| Total formal votes | | 42,827 | 97.4 | −0.5 |
| Informal votes | | 1,143 | 2.6 | +0.5 |
| Turnout | | 43,970 | 79.8 | −9.9 |
Two-candidate-preferred result
| Liberal | James Griffin | 20,187 | 60.5 | −14.0 |
| Independent | Kathryn Ridge | 13,158 | 39.5 | +39.5 |
| Liberal hold | | Swing | N/A | |

== See also ==
- Electoral results for the district of Manly
- List of New South Wales state by-elections
