= Reform Australia =

Australian political movement

Reform Australia is an Australian right-wing populist movement that was founded in December 2025 by Walter Villatora. It is not affiliated with Nigel Farage's Reform UK party, and not currently a registered political party.

== Background and description ==
Walter Villatora was formerly Liberal Party campaign director for Mike Baird and Tony Abbott, and president of the Warringah federal electorate conference (a branch in Sydney). In 2016 he was endorsed by Baird and Abbott to replace Bronwyn Bishop in the 2017 Manly state by-election, but was not selected.

Villatora left the Liberal Party after declaring that that it was "finished". In December 2025 he announced in an interview with Peter FitzSimons of The Sydney Morning Herald that he had formed a new political movement called Reform Australia.

Villatora was also formerly co-owner of the company behind Turning Point Australia (TPAUS), Ark Harbour, with Joel Jammal, but split as TPAUS wanted to remain an independent lobby group and not affiliated with any political party. Ex-Liberal candidate for the 2025 federal election, Ben Britton, who was dumped after expressing controversial views on Jammal's podcast, including that women should not serve in combat roles in the Australian Defence Force, has been featured on Reform Australia's Facebook ads.

Reform Australia has no affiliation with Nigel Farage's Reform UK party; however, it appears to be modelled on Farage's style of British right-wing populism, and on its own website mentions Farage as an example to emulate.

== Activity and views ==
As of February 2026 Reform Australia is not registered as a political party. Despite this, at an anti-immigration rally in Sydney in late November 2025, the group handed out pamphlets about Reform Australia. The group has expressed support for the March for Australia movement, and featured videos made by TPAUS.

Reform Australia presents itself as a traditional, "back to basics" movement, with promises of reforms to taxation, cost of living and continuing support for existing public services. It also presents an emphasis on freedom, equality, and border protection.
