= James Patrick Dunn =

Australian politician (1887-1945)

James Dunn
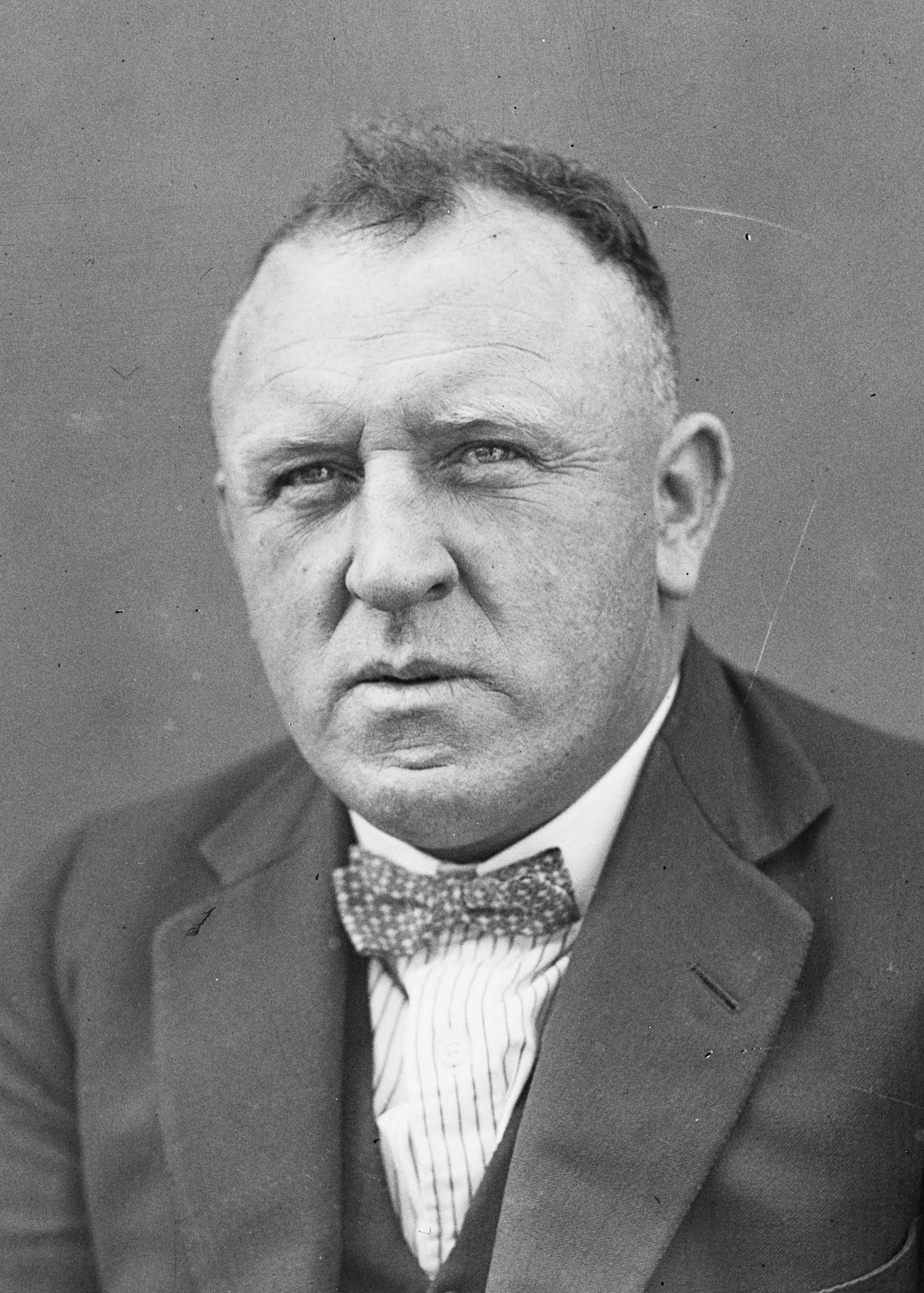

Senator for New South Wales
- In office 1 July 1929 – 30 June 1935

Personal details
- Born: James Patrick Dunn; 20 August 1887 Kirkdale, Liverpool, England
- Died: 21 November 1945 (aged 58) Dee Why, New South Wales, Australia
- Party: Labor
- Other political affiliations: Lang Labor; Industrial Labor
- Spouse: Alice Hynes (m. 1924; div. 1932)

James Patrick Digger Dunn (born James Patrick Dunn; 20 August 1887 – 21 November 1945) was an Australian politician who served as a Senator for New South Wales from 1929 to 1935. He was elected as a member of the Australian Labor Party (ALP), but after the 1931 party split joined the breakaway Lang Labor faction. He was one of only two Lang Labor senators, but was designated as the party's Senate leader. Dunn was a trade unionist and World War I soldier before entering politics. He was a perennial candidate for state and federal office between 1919 and 1945, but won only a single election.

== Early life ==
Dunn was born "probably" in Kirkdale, Liverpool, England. He was the son of Irish parents, Margaret (née Kavanagh) and Thomas Dunn. He went to sea at the age of 16, jumping ship in South Africa and taking up an engineering apprenticeship in Simon's Town. He later travelled to Australia, working for a glass company in Sydney, and then on to New Zealand where he worked as a miner, timber-trucker, and wharf labourer.

Dunn became involved in the New Zealand labour movement, helping to establish the Greymouth Carters' and Drivers' Union and serving as vice-president of the Westland Trades and Labor Council. He was an unsuccessful candidate for Greymouth Borough councillor in 1909. The following year, Dunn moved to Queensland, Australia, where he joined the Australian Workers' Union. He was involved in the 1911 sugar workers' strike. He subsequently moved to Sydney, finding work as an engine-driver at the Cockatoo Island Dockyard. He was vice-president of the Combined Iron Trades Federation and a delegate of the Federated Iron Workers' Association to the Labor Council of New South Wales.

In 1914, Dunn joined the Australian Naval and Military Expeditionary Force and was sent to New Guinea. He caught malaria and was returned to Australia, where he enlisted in the Australian Imperial Force. He was sent overseas in March 1916, and saw active service in France and the Middle East. Dunn was discharged in November 1919 and returned to Cockatoo Island.

== Politics ==
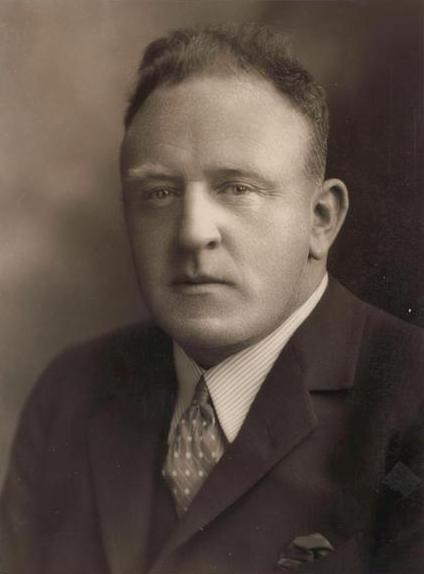
Dunn c. 1920s

Dunn was elected to the Labor Party state executive in 1921. He first stood for parliament at the 1919 federal election, losing to Walter Marks in the Division of Wentworth. He was an unsuccessful candidate for the Senate in 1922 and 1925, eventually winning a seat at the 1928 election. Three months prior to the election, he adopted "Digger" as one of his middle names so it would appear on the ballot. He was subsequently criticised by Major General Harold "Pompey" Elliott for doing so.

Dunn's term in the Senate began on 1 July 1929. He attributed the Great Depression to the "international money power, which controls the very existence of every man and woman in the capitalist-controlled countries on this earth". In March 1931, Dunn joined the breakaway Lang Labor faction, which comprised supporters of Jack Lang's left-wing populist economic policies. He was one of only two Lang Labor senators, along with 71-year-old Arthur Rae, but was nonetheless nominated as its Senate leader. He was among those who voted to bring down the Scullin Government in November 1931, and played a key role in coordinating the vote with United Australia Party, working with UAP senator Hal Colebatch. Dunn was defeated at the 1934 federal election. Although he personally polled 32.7 percent of the vote, the preferential block voting system in use at the time meant that the Coalition won all three seats with just over half of the total.

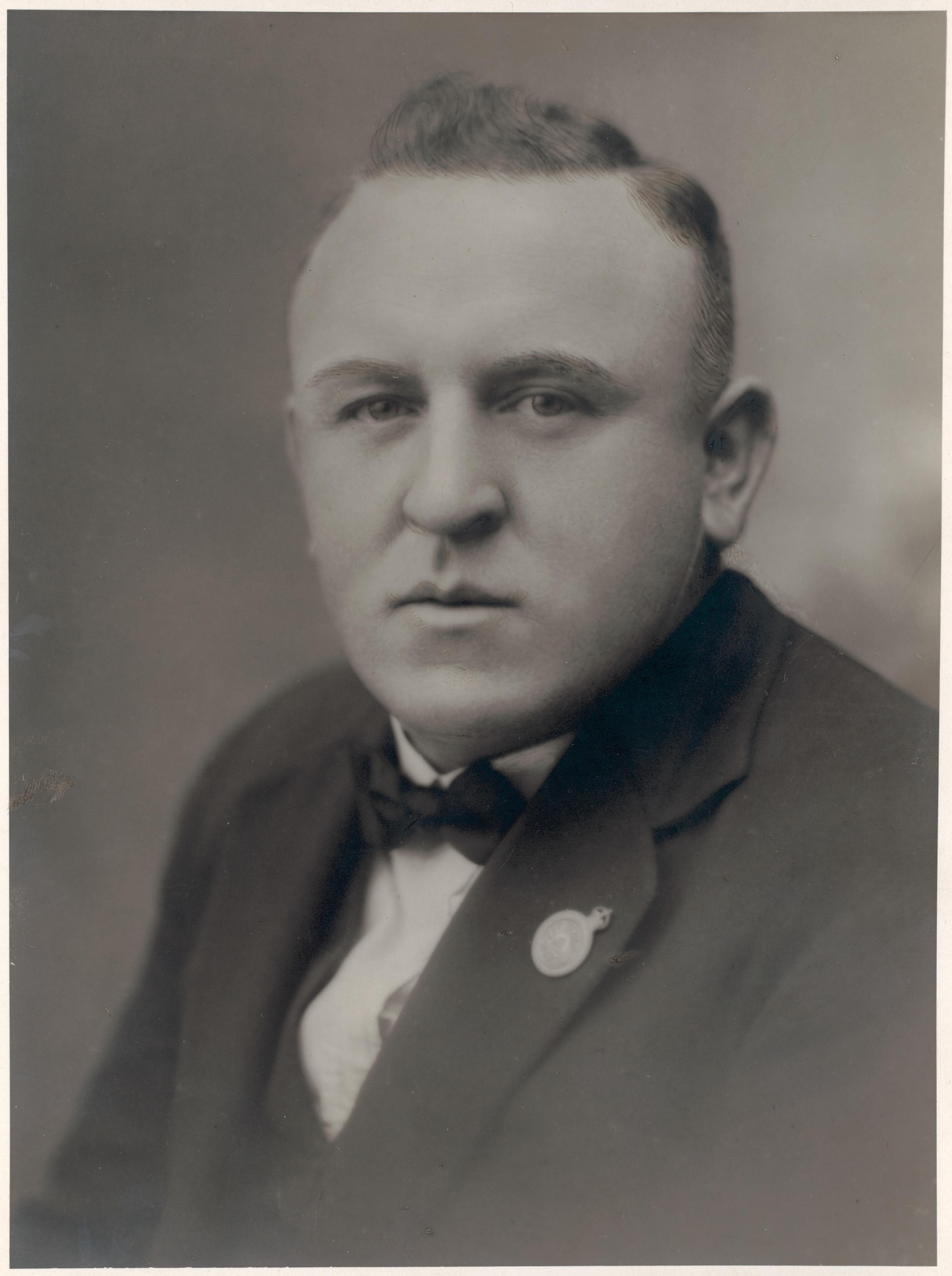
Undated photo

After his defeat, Dunn established a chemical manufacturing company whose main product was a compound analgesic marketed as a headache powder. He remained politically involved, and at the 1938 state election stood as a candidate of the Industrial Labor Party, another breakaway group. He lost to the official Labor candidate in Leichhardt. In 1941, Dunn's old Lang Labor colleague Eddie Ward secured him a position in the Department of Labour and National Service. He was terminated in November 1943 after Ward left the department. Dunn eventually rejoined the Labor Party, standing unsuccessfully in Manly at the 1941 and 1944 elections. His final candidacy came at the 1945 Manly state by-election, caused by the death of Alfred Reid. He was denied ALP preselection and stood as a Soldiers' Party candidate, which precipitated his expulsion from the Labor Party.

== Personal life ==
Dunn married Alice Mary Hynes on 2 February 1924. The couple had three children together, two sons and a daughter. In 1932, his wife was imprisoned for one month after being convicted of forgery, uttering, and obtaining money under false pretences. He obtained a divorce in the same year, and received custody of the children. Dunn was "a Roman Catholic, a non-smoker and teetotaller". He died suddenly at his home in Dee Why on 21 November 1945, and was buried at Frenchs Forest Bushland Cemetery.
