= Peter Macdonald (Australian politician) =

Australian politician (born 1943)

Dr. Peter Macdonald OAM

Member of the New South Wales Parliament for Manly
- In office 25 May 1991 – 5 March 1999
- Preceded by: David Hay
- Succeeded by: David Barr

52nd Mayor of Manly
- In office 27 March 2004 – 13 September 2008
- Deputy: Judy Lambert; Richard Morrison; Barbara Aird; Brad Pedersen; Mark Norek
- Preceded by: Jean Hay
- Succeeded by: Jean Hay

Personal details
- Born: 29 May 1943 (age 83) Glasgow, Scotland, United Kingdom
- Party: Independent
- Education: University of London
- Occupation: General Practitioner

Peter Alexander Cameron Macdonald OAM (born 29 May 1943) is an Australian medical practitioner and politician from Glasgow, Scotland. He was formerly the independent member for the Electoral district of Manly in the New South Wales Legislative Assembly and Mayor of Manly Council.

== Career ==
Born in Glasgow, Scotland, Macdonald was educated in Edinburgh, the University of London (MB, BS) and King's College Hospital. During this time, he was involved with the Royal College of General Practitioners (MRCGP) and joined the Royal College of Obstetricians and Gynaecologists, obtaining a Diploma in Anaesthetics (DA) and a Diploma in Obstetrics (DRCOG).

Macdonald emigrated to Australia in 1972. He settled in Manly and worked as a general practitioner from 1973 to 2006. He was elected to Manly Municipal Council from 1984 to 1999, becoming Deputy Mayor from 1995 to 1996. He was member for Manly from 1991 to 1999. In 2000 Macdonald founded and is the current President of Australian Doctors International, which provides non-government health care and development aid in remote and rural regions of Papua New Guinea. He also worked with Médecins Sans Frontières in Iran in 1999, with Timor Aid in 2000 and was also Director of international community development organisation Plan International Australia from 2000 to 2003.

Macdonald resumed his local political career in 2004 when he was elected as Mayor of Manly, serving until 2008. He was re-elected as a councillor at the 2008 Local Government Elections following his announcement of not running for mayor and retired at the 2012 local government elections. In the 2011 Queen's Birthday Honours, Macdonald was presented with the Medal of the Order of Australia (OAM) "For service to local government, and to medicine."

New South Wales Legislative Assembly
Preceded by David Hay	Member for Manly; 1991 – 1999	Succeeded by David Barr
Civic offices
Preceded by Jean Hay	Mayor of Manly; 2004 – 2008	Succeeded by Jean Hay
