= Turning Point Australia =

Australian conservative organisation

- Abbreviation: TPAUS
- Formation: 20 January 2023; 3 years ago (Note: This was when the ABN for Turning Point Australia Pty Ltd was registered. The website says the organisation was founded during the COVID-19 pandemic in Australia.)
- Purpose: Conservative activism
- Headquarters: Sydney, New South Wales
- Origins: COVID-19 pandemic
- Region served: Australia
- Leader: Joel Jammal
- Website: tpaust.com.au

Turning Point Australia (TPAUS) is a conservative lobby group based in Australia, affiliated with Turning Point USA but independent of it. Founded by Joel Jammal and first registered in 2023, the group was active in trying to influence the outcome of the 2026 South Australian state election in March 2026.

== Background and history ==
=== Joel Jammal ===
Joel Jammal is an Australian of Syrian and Lebanese heritage. He describes himself as "a Christian journalist and conservative political commentator", and stated in 2020 that he lectured at the Sydney Institute for Christian Studies. In 2019, he first appeared in the media when he supported 18-year-old Samraat Joshua Grewal's unsuccessful attempt to topple Fred Nile as the leader of the Christian Democratic Party.

Jammal was an active participant in anti-lockdown rallies during the COVID-19 pandemic, and posted long interviews with extreme conspiracy theorist Riccardo Bosi, who promoted, among other things, vaccine skepticism and 5G misinformation. Jammal agrees with Bosi's views on the COVID-19 vaccine, and says that he had also wondered whether the Port Arthur massacre had really happened. Jammal was charged with encouraging criminal behaviour and breaching public health orders in July 2021.

He then started working with conservative figures such as Craig Kelly and Dougal Cameron (son of former Liberal MP Ross Cameron), and worked in a voluntary capacity for the Conservative Political Action Conference Australia, run by Andrew Cooper, co-founder and national director of CPAC Australia.

As of February 2026, Jammal's bio on the TPAUS website states that he is the founding host of a political news podcast for young Australians called The ARK, and owner-publisher of The Light Australia.

=== Foundation ===
Turning Point Australia is an offshoot of the organisation formed by American right-wing activist Charlie Kirk. It was set up on the recommendation of Nigel Farage, leader of Reform UK, and approved by Kirk. Jammal, along with Damien Costas, organised a tour of Australia by Farage in 2022. Along with Andrew Cooper, who ran Conservative Political Action Conference Australia, and former Liberal Party staffer Barclay McGain, Jammal launched Turning Point Australia. It was first registered as a limited company, as "Turning Point Australia Pty Ltd", on the Australian Business Register on 20 January 2023.

=== Activities and growth ===
TPAUS organised an event espousing climate change denial views with One Nation NSW MP Mark Latham, United Australia Party national director Craig Kelly, and One Nation Senator Malcolm Roberts, hosted by Jammal. At the 2023 annual conference of Church and State (CAS), a conservative Christian "political education ministry" founded by David Pellowe (Note: Candidate for Family First Party in the 2015 Queensland state election and 2016 Australian federal election.) in 2018, Jammal hosted a panel discussion titled "Political reformation". Latham and Roberts were also presenters at the conference, along with George Christensen and former deputy prime minister John Anderson.

After the murder of Kirk, Turning Point Australia organised a sunset vigil in Hyde Park in Sydney on 13 September 2025, which was attended by around 300 people. Jammal said at the time that he had been planning to bring Kirk out to Australia.

In October 2025, conservative social media personality George Mamalis was appointed to the new role of state coordinator for South Australia. TPAUS focused on SA first because of the upcoming state election in March 2026. George Mamalis previously worked for former state Liberal leader David Speirs, for Sarah Game when she was with One Nation SA, and later for Liberal senator Alex Antic, is a leader in South Australia. His bio on the TPAUS website says that he is "an Orthodox Christian with strong libertarian values", and founded The Adelaide Set, "a grassroots media platform with over 250,000 followers". (Note: According to an ABC News article in October 2025, "181,000 followers on Instagram and 33,000 on Facebook".) The Adelaide Set started espousing vaccine skepticism during the COVID-19 pandemic, and since then has been dominated by right-wing issues such as "mass migration", net zero, trans issues, and the protection of "western culture". Mamalis regularly shares videos and posts about or by South Australian anti-abortion campaigner Joanna Howe, Sarah Game, Pauline Hanson, and Adelaide City Councillor Henry Davis, who is running for Sarah Game's new party, Fair Go for Australians.

By early 2026, Turning Point Australia had announced that it was opening branches nationwide, and aims to influence the outcome of elections. Its website claims that founder Jammal has, through TPA, "participat[ed] in more electoral contests over a four-year period than any other political entity; spanning local, state, federal elections, by-elections, and the national referendum". When challenged about this claim, TPAUS did not provide any specific details.

TPAUS aims to establish chapters across Australia, including in high schools and universities, and Jammal wants politicians to see them as "the biggest threat in keeping voters informed". Jammal and Mammalis claimed on a podcast on 7 December 2025 that TPAUS intends to lobby for minor right-wing parties at the March 2026 South Australian state election. The group has claimed that it expects to spend over A$10,000 on their campaign, which will see them hosting events on university campuses, among other events. As at 25 February 2026 (less than a month before the South Australia election), the website contains no details of any events or campaigns in connection with the election.

== Description ==
The organisation is affiliated with and licensed by Turning Point USA under a branding agreement, but is an independent organisation run by Australians. It is headquartered in the Sydney suburb of Brighton-Le-Sands.

As of February 2026, Turning Point Australia's national director is Joel Jammal. George Mamalis is South Australian state coordinator. Saraya Beric, former marketing manager, federal secretary and Queensland secretary for One Nation, is head of operations and marketing.

== Connections and views ==
At the time of its launch, despite Jammal's stated intention "to do a similar thing" as Turning Point USA, it began by acting as a broader conservative group. Its website described Turning Point Australia as a "a non-profit organisation with a mission to identify, educate, train, and organise a community movement to promote the principles of freedom, free markets, and limited government". He has emphasised the group's independence from Turning Point USA, saying that the latter has no involvement in the Australian group's operations.

As of February 2026, its website is emblazoned with the slogan "We fight for individual freedoms against big Government and special interests". It now describes its mission as "to organise grassroots activism campaigns that educate, train, and assist citizens in fighting for freedom in Australia", and emphasises that it is "a real grassroots organisation that works for the benefit of regular Australian people". In a December podcast, Jammal describes the group as "'ambassadors' for freedom, free speech, family values, and business".

There has been criticism of Turning Point Australia Fair Go from both right and left for adopting an American style of politics, which is polarising.

Former Liberal Party branch president Walter Villatora was a co-owner of the company behind Turning Point Australia, Ark Harbour, before founding a new political party called Reform Australia, joined by one-time federal Liberal candidate, Ben Britton. Jammal had provided tech support to the party's website, but had cut business ties with Villatora, saying that TPAUS is a third party campaigner, not a political party, and maintains separation from parties.

In a 2026 interview on The West Report, TPAUS founder Joel Jammal claimed that he had been approached at least three times by Zionist lobbying organisations to either publicly support Israel or regularly feature Jews on his program. He also claimed that he was offered a $300k per month sponsorship.
