= David Hay (Australian politician) =

Australian politician (1933–2025)

David Aberdeen Hay, MBE (26 October 1933 – 10 May 2025) was an Australian politician. He was the Liberal member for Manly in the New South Wales Legislative Assembly from 1984 to 1991, and state Minister for Local Government and Minister for Planning from 1988 to 1991.

== Life and career ==
Hay was born in Manly and was educated at Manly Boys' High School. He served in the military as a RAAF pilot, and worked as a company director. He was an Alderman of Manly Municipal Council for twenty-three years, including six terms as Mayor and eight as Deputy Mayor, and was also a Mackellar County Councillor for six years, including one year as chairman. In 1984, Hay defeated the Labor member for the seat of Manly, Alan Stewart, and was made Minister for Local Government and Minister for Planning shortly after winning his second term in 1988. In 1991, however, he was narrowly defeated by independent candidate Peter Macdonald.

Hay died on 10 May 2025, at the age of 91. He is survived by his widow Jean Hay who was the last mayor of Manly, serving from 2008 until 2016.

Civic offices
Preceded by Dick Dein	Mayor of Manly; 1967	Succeeded by William Iles
Preceded by William Iles	Mayor of Manly; 1971–1973	Succeeded by William Manning
Preceded by Joan Thorburn	Mayor of Manly; 1983–1984	Succeeded by Judith Mellowes
Government offices
Preceded by W. R. Nicholas	Chairman of the Mackellar County Council; 1969–1970	Succeeded by Winston Gray
New South Wales Legislative Assembly
Preceded by Alan Stewart	Member for Manly; 1984–1991	Succeeded by Peter Macdonald
Political offices
Preceded by Janice Crosio	Minister for Local Government; 1988–1991	Succeeded by Gerry Peacocke
Preceded by Harry Jensen	Minister for Planning; 1988–1991	Succeeded by Robert Webster
