= Alan Stewart (Australian politician) =

Australian politician

Alan Gibson Stewart (born 28 March 1938) is a former Australian politician. He was the Labor member for Manly in the New South Wales Legislative Assembly from 1978 to 1984.

Born in Manly, Stewart attended public schools in Harbord and Manly, and then St Aloysius College. He studied at Sydney Technical College, Wagga Agricultural College and Macquarie University, where he earned a Bachelor of Arts and a Master of Science. He later received a PhD in Environmental Science from Griffith University. He served as President of the Harbord branch of the Australian Labor Party and a delegate to the Manly State Electoral Council. Stewart is the author of two books: Hard Row to Hoe and Persian Expedition.

In 1978, Stewart won the traditionally Liberal seat of Manly after sitting member Douglas Darby's retirement. He narrowly held the seat in 1981, but was defeated by David Hay in 1984.

New South Wales Legislative Assembly
Preceded by Douglas Darby	Member for Manly; 1978 – 1984	Succeeded by David Hay
