= List of mayors of Manly =

Mayor of Manly Council
- Style: His/Her Worship
- Appointer: Manly Council
- Term length: One Year (1877–1995); Four years (1995–2016)
- Formation: 15 February 1877
- First holder: Ald. Thomas Rowe
- Final holder: Cr. Jean Hay
- Abolished: 12 May 2016
- Deputy: Cr. James Griffin
- Website: Manly Council (Archived)

This is a list of the Mayors of Manly Council, a former local government area of New South Wales, Australia. The official title of Mayors while holding office was: His/Her Worship The Mayor of Manly. First incorporated on 6 January 1877 as the Municipality of Manly, the council met for the first time on 15 February 1877, when the first mayor was elected. The council became known as Manly Council on 1 July 1993 following the enactment of the Local Government Act, 1993 which also stipulated that the term 'Town Clerk' be replaced with 'General Manager' and 'Alderman' be replaced by 'Councillor'. Originally a role nominated by the council annually, from 1995 until abolition in 2016 it was directly elected every four years. The last Mayor of Manly was Councillor Jean Hay (Liberal), elected on 8 September 2008.

== Mayors ==
Years	Mayors	Notes
15 February 1877 – 7 February 1879	Thomas Rowe	
7 February 1879 – 7 February 1881	Alfred Hilder	
7 February 1881 – 12 June 1882	George William Barker	
12 June 1882 – 9 February 1883	John Joseph Lough	
9 February 1883 – 15 May 1885	Charles Hadley Hayes	
15 May 1885 – 10 February 1887	Charles Rudland Austin	
10 February 1887 – 9 June 1887	Nicholas Weekes	
20 June 1887 – 13 February 1888	Charles Rudland Austin	
13 February 1888 – 7 February 1889	John George Griffin	
7 February 1889 – 4 February 1892	John Cameron	
4 February 1892 – 11 February 1895	Walter Hussey German	
11 February 1895 – 12 February 1897	Harry Eustace Farmer	
12 February 1897 – 14 February 1899	Frederick Charles Passau	
14 February 1899 – 15 February 1901	William Horner Fletcher	
15 February 1901 – February 1907	Ellison Quirk	
February 1907 – February 1908	Alexander Learmonth	
February 1908 – February 1914	James Bonner	
February 1914 – February 1917	Arthur Thomas Keirle	
February 1917 – February 1918	Adam Ogilvy	
February 1918 – February 1919	Francis William Heaton	
February 1919 – 21 November 1921	Alfred Reid	
1 December 1921 – December 1922	Francis William Heaton	
December 1922 – 10 December 1923	Arthur Thomas Keirle	
10 December 1923 – December 1925	Alfred Charles Samuels	
December 1925 – December 1928	Arthur Thomas Keirle	
December 1928 – December 1929	Vincent John Brady	
December 1929 – December 1930	Charles W. Gourlay	
December 1930 – December 1931	Arthur Harcourt	
December 1931 – December 1932	Josiah R. Trenerry	
December 1932 – December 1933	John Henry Cross	
December 1933 – December 1934	Alfred Seller	
December 1934 – December 1935	John Henry Cross	
December 1935 – December 1938	Percy Nolan	
December 1938 – 13 December 1941	Aubrey Hanson–Norman	
13 December 1941 – December 1942	Robert A. Miller	
December 1942 – December 1943	Aubrey Hanson–Norman	
December 1943 – December 1944	Charles Wearne Breakspear	
December 1944 – December 1946	James Anderson	
December 1946 – December 1947	Robert A. Miller	
December 1947 – December 1950	C. R. Scharkie	
December 1950 – December 1951	James Anderson	
December 1951 – December 1953	James H. Brown	
December 1953 – December 1954	Aubrey Hanson–Norman	
December 1954 – December 1958	Merv Paine	
December 1958 – December 1960	W. Fairbairn	
December 1960 – December 1963	Jim W. Paton	
December 1963 – December 1965	William R. Nicholas	
December 1965 – December 1966	Dick Dein	
December 1966 – December 1967	David Hay	
December 1967 – September 1970	William Iles	
September 1970 – September 1973	David Hay	
September 1973 – September 1975	William A. Manning	
September 1975 – September 1977	William R. Murray	
September 1977 – September 1979	Frank S. Preacher	
September 1979 – September 1983	Joan A. Thorburn	
September 1983 – September 1984	David Hay	
September 1984 – September 1986	Judith A. Mellowes	
September 1986 – September 1988	Greg Smith	
September 1988 – September 1989	Joan Lily Cooke	
September 1989 – September 1991	Michael P. Heraghty	
September 1991 – September 1992	Greg Smith	
September 1992 – September 1993	Michael P. Heraghty	
September 1993 – September 1994	Geoffrey Smith	
September 1994 – 9 September 1995	Brian Hamer	
9 September 1995 – 11 September 1999	Sue Sacker (Independent)	
11 September 1999 – 27 March 2004	Jean Hay (Liberal)	
27 March 2004 – 8 September 2008	Peter Macdonald (Manly Independents)	
8 September 2008 – 12 May 2016	Jean Hay (Liberal)	

== Town Clerks/General Managers ==
Name	Term	Notes
George Alfred Hewett (Interim)	21 February 1877 – 6 April 1877	
William Johnson	6 April 1877 – 25 July 1878	
T. D. Meares	25 July 1878 – 4 March 1879	
George Henry Rawson (acting)	4 March 1879 – 1 September 1879	
Joseph Whitehead Lees	1 September 1879 – 1 May 1881	
Charles Wagstaff	1 May 1881 – 15 August 1884	
James Jones	15 August 1884 – 7 October 1886	
Thomas Charles Haylock	7 October 1886 – 27 August 1901	
Daniel Hogan	27 August 1901 – 7 April 1921	
Leslie C. Wellings	7 April 1921 – 1958	
L. E. Whalan	1958–1971	
J. H. Carter (acting)	1971–1972	
Cecil Ross Menzies	1972 – January 1989	
Wayne Collins	January 1989 – September 2002	
Henry Wong	December 2002 – 12 May 2016	
