= James Griffin (Australian politician) =

Australian politician

James Griffin MP

Member of the New South Wales Legislative Assembly for Manly
- Incumbent
- Assumed office 8 April 2017
- Preceded by: Mike Baird

Minister for Environment and Heritage
- In office 21 December 2021 – 28 March 2023
- Premier: Dominic Perrottet
- Preceded by: Matt Kean (as Minister for Energy and Environment)
- Succeeded by: Penny Sharpe

Deputy Mayor of Manly
- In office 5 October 2015 – 12 May 2016
- Mayor: Jean Hay
- Preceded by: Steve Pickering
- Succeeded by: Council abolished
- In office 8 September 2012 – 12 May 2016

Personal details
- Born: Manly, New South Wales, Australia
- Party: Liberal Party
- Education: University of Notre Dame Australia
- Website: jamesgriffinmp.com

James Henry Griffin is an Australian politician. He is a member of the New South Wales Legislative Assembly representing the electoral district of Manly for the Liberal Party. Griffin was the New South Wales Minister for Environment and Heritage in the Second Perrottet ministry from December 2021 to March 2023.

Griffin is a senior member of the New South Wales Liberal Parliamentary Party. He currently serves as Shadow Minister for Energy and Climate Change, Shadow Minister for Digital, Artificial Intelligence and Investment, and Shadow Minister for Customer Service, and is Manager of Opposition Business in the Legislative Assembly.

He had previously served as a Cabinet Minister and as the NSW Parliamentary Secretary for Veterans, the NSW Parliamentary Secretary for Health, and NSW Parliamentary Secretary for the Environment.

Griffin was elected on 8 April 2017 at the Manly state by-election held to replace the previous member, former premier of New South Wales Mike Baird.

== Background ==
Griffin went to school at St Mary's Cathedral College, and in 2006 was one of the first students to enrol at the Sydney campus of the University of Notre Dame Australia, from which he graduated with a Bachelor of Arts in 2008.

Griffin was also involved in local government, serving a single term as a councillor on Manly Council, and as deputy mayor under Mayor Jean Hay from 2015 to 2016 when the council was amalgamated into the Northern Beaches Council. His mother, Cathy Griffin, was a major in the Australian Army, and also served one term as a councillor in Manly, albeit as a member of the NSW Greens.

He is the son of Australian Army Officer Brigadier Michael Griffin AM (Ret) who was the Australian Commissioner for Law Enforcement Integrity.

Griffin was appointed as an adjunct lecturer in the School of Business at the University of Notre Dame, Sydney. He has also served as a board member of the University of Sydney Innovation Hub. Griffin co-founded SR7, a digital risk consulting company, in 2009. In February 2014, SR7 was acquired by professional service group KPMG, with Griffin joining the firm as a Director in the Risk Consulting Practice.

Griffin has connections across the political and business community including former Premiers Berejiklian, Baird and Perrottet. Former Australian Foreign Minister, Julie Bishop is also named as a mentor alongside Chief Executive Officer of GB News, Angelos Frangopolous.

In 2022, Griffin was named to the Asia Society's Asia 21 Young Leaders Class of 2022, a fellowship recognising emerging leaders across the Asia-Pacific region under the age of 40.

== Political career ==
Griffin was reported as a potential NSW Opposition Leader following the Coalition election loss in March 2023.

Identified as a rising star in the NSW Parliamentary Liberal Party, Griffin was appointed a Member of the Legislation Review Committee in June 2017, and subsequently appointed Chair of the same committee in November 2017. The Legislation Review Committee reviews all Bills introduced into Parliament and reports on the impact of these Bills on personal rights and liberties.

In September 2018 Griffin was elected Chairman of the NSW Parliamentary Committee on Environment and Planning. The Committee tabled the Land Release and Housing Supply in NSW report in October 2018.

Griffin has been a staunch supporter of reforms to curb problematic gambling in the state.

As Parliamentary Secretary for Veterans, Griffin co-authored and launched the state's first ever comprehensive Veterans Strategy.

As Minister for Environment and Heritage, Griffin oversaw the largest single land acquisition for national park expansion in New South Wales history with the purchase of Thurloo Downs, a 437,394-hectare outback property near the Queensland border. This ecologically significant region is home to more than 50 threatened species and contains diverse desert landscapes. The acquisition reflected Griffin’s broader strategy to enhance biodiversity protection, build climate resilience, and support joint land management with Traditional Owners—cementing his leadership in forward-looking conservation policy.

Other reforms during his time as Minister for Environment and Heritage include:

- Single-Use Plastics Ban: In June 2022, New South Wales implemented a ban on lightweight single-use plastic bags, with further restrictions on items like straws and cutlery introduced later that year.
- Return and Earn Scheme Expansion: The NSW Government expanded the Return and Earn container deposit scheme to include additional beverage containers, aiming to boost recycling rates and reduce litter.
- Sustainable Farming Program: A $206 million Sustainable Farming Program was launched to support farmers in adopting environmentally friendly practices, enhancing natural capital and biodiversity.
- Blue Carbon Strategy: The NSW Blue Carbon Strategy was introduced to protect and restore coastal ecosystems that capture and store carbon, contributing to climate change mitigation efforts.
- AI-Powered Environmental Monitoring: Innovative AI technologies were employed to monitor and reduce litter in Sydney Harbour, aiming to protect marine life and improve water quality.
- Marine Habitat Restoration: The "Seabirds to Seascapes" initiative, backed by a $9.1 million investment, was launched to restore marine habitats in Sydney Harbour for species like penguins and seahorses.
- Recycling Infrastructure Development: Funding was allocated to establish recycling facilities for solar panels and batteries, promoting a circular economy and addressing renewable energy waste.

In September 2026, Griffin announced that he would retire from state parliament at the 2027 election.

=== Artificial intelligence and digital policy ===
In January 2026, Griffin's shadow portfolio was expanded to include Artificial Intelligence, Digital Government and Investment, in addition to his existing Energy and Climate Change portfolio, as part of a reshuffle under Opposition Leader Kellie Sloane.

In February 2026, Griffin raised concerns about NSW Government's limited approach to data centre and AI infrastructure investment, arguing that a lack of coordination across energy, planning and investment policy risked ceding the sector to Victoria.

In July 2026, the NSW Liberals and Nationals announced a policy, developed under Griffin's portfolio, to guarantee that frontline public sector workers would not be replaced by artificial intelligence if elected in 2027, including a proposed NSW Jobs Guarantee and AI Efficiency Act, a dedicated Minister for Artificial Intelligence, and an NSW AI Solutions Fund to finance AI projects in areas such as disaster response and traffic management.

Civic offices
Preceded by Steve Pickering	Deputy Mayor of Manly; 2015–2016	Council merged into Northern Beaches Council
New South Wales Legislative Assembly
Preceded by Mike Baird	Member for Manly; 2017–present	Incumbent
Political offices
Preceded by Matt Kean as Minister for Energy and Environment	Minister for Environment and Heritage; 2021–2023	Succeeded by Penny Sharpe
