= Sophie Delezio =

Australian accident survivor

Sophie Joy Martin Delezio (born 3 April 2001) is an Australian woman who was injured in two serious traffic crashes when she was young.

She first gained media attention in December 2003, at 2.5 years old when she was badly injured when a car crashed into her day care centre. She suffered third-degree burns to 85% of her body and was hospitalised for almost a year, where she lost both legs from below the knee, her right hand, and an ear. She was involved in a second serious car crash in 2006 at the age of 5.

Her family has become major fundraisers and activists for victims who suffer conditions like Sophie's, and have also assisted in fundraising for The Children's Hospital at Westmead.

== Family ==
Delezio is the first daughter of Ron Delezio and Carolyn Martin and the younger sister of Mitchell Delezio and half-sister of Catherine Delezio and John Delezio. She is one of the grand daughters of Dr. Allan Martin, a long active TV producer and senior athlete.

== First crash ==
Delezio first came to the attention of the public on 15 December 2003 when she and Molly Wood, both two years old at the time, were badly injured when they were trapped under a burning car which had crashed through the window of the Roundhouse Childcare Centre in Fairlight, Sydney, Australia. She suffered burns to 85% of her body, was hospitalised for several months, and lost both legs below the knee, right hand, and her right ear. Wood suffered burns to 40% of her body, but has since made a good recovery. Delezio was released from Westmead Children's Hospital on Monday 21 June 2004. The circumstances of the crash, and the rescue of the children by passers-by and members of the emergency services (for which a number received bravery awards) made them the subject of national news coverage.

The driver who crashed into the child care centre, Donald John McNeall, was 68 at the time of the accident. He was cleared of negligent driving before a magistrate's court as it could not be satisfied beyond reasonable doubt that he did not have a seizure.

In late 2004, Delezio's parents founded the Day of Difference Foundation, a charity dedicated to raising funds for research into pediatric burns and related diseases. As of 2009, the foundation has raised over $6.5 million.

In January 2006, Delezio was enrolled at Balgowlah Heights Public School. The school was extensively refurbished to accommodate Delezio's needs.

Due to the driver not being found liable, nobody was responsible for Delezio's extensive medical costs. However, the driver's compulsory third party insurance provider, the NRMA, covered the costs ex-gratia. Due to this loophole in insurance coverage the NSW government introduced the Children's Special Benefit for children under 16 where no insurance coverage is available and later introduced a similar scheme to cover third parties of any age injured in an accident where nobody is liable called "Blameless Accidents".

In 2005, journalist Mark Whittaker won a Walkley Award for his harrowing account of the rescue of dozens of children from inside The Roundhouse Childcare Centre by a large group of people who were unknown to each other. Originally published in The Weekend Australian, the account was adapted to become the first chapter of Whittaker's book, Brave.

== Second crash ==
On 5 May 2006, Delezio made national headlines a second time when she was again badly injured in a road crash. While being pushed across a crossing by her nanny in a wheelchair (her service dog Tara by her side) near her home in Sydney's northern beaches, she was hit by a car and thrown 18 metres. Delezio suffered a heart attack, a broken jaw, a broken shoulder, bruising to her head, numerous rib fractures and a tear to her left lung. She was treated at the Sydney Children's Hospital, Randwick. She left hospital and returned home to continue her recovery on 7 June 2006.

An 80-year-old man, John George Sharman, was charged in relation to the second crash with "dangerous driving occasioning grievous bodily harm, negligent driving occasioning grievous bodily harm and not giving way to a pedestrian on a crossing". Having pleaded guilty Sharman was in October 2006 placed on a good behaviour bond for 18 months and suspended from driving for a year.

Delezio's father maintained that while accidents do happen, the number of incidents occurring at the pedestrian crossing in question means it must be reconstructed.

On 16 July 2006, Delezio's story was told on Channel 7's True Stories series.

== Life after the crashes ==
Delezio returned to classes after recovery at Balgowlah Heights Public School on Thursday, 20 July 2006.

In June 2011, it was reported that she aspired to be a paralympic swimmer. She later switched to rowing. In 2020 she appeared in Series 5 of Anh's Brush with Fame.

In April 2023 she announced her engagement.

In April 2024 Sophie announced that she and her fiancée Joseph Salerno are expecting their first child together in September of the same year.

On 13 September 2024, Sophie announced on Instagram that she and her fiancée (Joseph Salerno) welcomed a baby boy, Frankie Salerno.

== Responses ==
As a result of Delezio's crash, more than $14 million has been raised by the foundation the Delezio family set up, and public awareness for the need for adequate support and services for pediatric burns patients has increased. Some of these funds were raised at the Kids 4 Kids Benefit Concert held on 10 September 2006. The NSW Government announced that it is investigating the possibility of reducing the age for mandatory medical checks for drivers from 80 to 75 years of age, and it agreed to install traffic lights at the crossing where the crash occurred.

Periodically Delezio and the two crashes are referenced in the media particularly when concerns are raised about road safety in the vicinity of educational institutions.

Her father, Ron Delezio, was an independent candidate in the 2017 Manly state by-election.
