= Douglas Darby =

Australian politician

Evelyn Douglas Darby MP (24 September 1910 – 22 August 1985) was an Australian politician, elected as a member of the New South Wales Legislative Assembly. His efforts in denouncing socialism, attacking the labour movement, breaking strikes, organising anti-Soviet Eastern European émigrés, supporting Australia's military commitment to the Vietnam War, and championing non-communist Taiwan, established Darby's reputation as a powerful right-wing ideologue.

== Early life ==
Darby was born in Lowestoft, England, and remained proud to be British throughout his life. His parents were Percy Charles Darby, estate agent, and his wife Jessie, née Ainslie, a branch secretary of Shop Assistants Union.

He trained at Portsmouth Teachers College before taking a job as steward and galley hand on a P&O liner and in that role visited Australia in 1926. He migrated to Australia in 1928 and trained as a teacher at Sydney Teachers' College, after which he taught in country and city primary schools in New South Wales in the years 1930-45.

After the outbreak of World War II in 1939, Darby attempted to enlist in the Second Australian Imperial Force but was rejected because of myopia. Instead, having studied at the University of Sydney and having graduated with a Bachelor of Economics in 1938, he was seconded from primary teaching to the Youth Section of the Federal Department of Labour and Industry, to work as a vocational officer.

Darby went on to found the British Orphans' Adoption Society (BOAS) which "sought to bring British war orphans to Australia for legal adoption." From June 1940 to January 1941, the Society sent 2,000 pounds in weight of warm clothing to England. Dame Enid Lyons, the widow of former Prime Minister Joseph Lyons, Professor F.A. Bland, Darby's economics professor, and Sir Arthur Rickard, owner of Sydney's largest real estate company, became BOAS patrons.

== Political career ==
In 1945 BOAS became a member of the United Nations Relief and Rehabilitation Association, and a chance meeting with Richard Thompson, a United Australia Party Member of the New South Wales Legislative Council (MLC), led to Thompson supporting Darby's nomination as the Liberal Party candidate for Manly in that year's New South Wales State election.

Representing Prime Minister Robert Menzies' "forgotten people" in post-war Manly, Darby proved a strong advocate for his middle-class seaside constituency, and his advocacy of conservative moral values and individual liberty and his opposition to communism became the hallmarks of his career.

A year after winning Manly for the Liberal Party, Darby attempted to break a 24-hour tram and bus strike in his electorate, seeing the Tramways Union as part of Labor's "servile state". Although denounced by strikers as a "strike breaker", most commentators supported Darby's efforts. A further bus and tram strike in January 1947 brought Darby's Manly Emergency Services Committee into operation and there were physical conflicts with communists from Sydney. Throughout the 1950s and early 1960s, seven public transport strikes occurred in Sydney, but each strike was weakened by the many individuals who responded to Darby's appeal for motorists to offer lifts to stranded commuters.

Breaking strikes won Darby approval in his electorate and among his parliamentary colleagues, acts that he increasingly saw as fighting the enemy of communism within. Darby's preoccupation with the communist menace, and success of his "interventions", encouraged him to mount 'Operation Potato' in March 1947, after 6,000 Sydney waterside workers "refused to convert to a 53-hour week again", and he used volunteers to unload food ships under police protection. That helped Darby to return with an increased majority in that year's state election.

As the Cold War conflict intensified, Darby began to make his mark as an anti-communist, believing that the "Free World" was threatened "by Soviet Communist tyranny and its agents worldwide". His contacts with European émigrés escaping communist regimes in the postwar period led to him becoming the founding president of the Captive Nations Council of New South Wales in 1959. From the late 1960s until the late 1970s Darby attended of conferences of the World Anti-Communist League (WACL) in Bangkok in 1969, Tokyo in 1970, Manila in 1971 and Rio de Janeiro in 1975. In 1982 he attended the Anti-Bolshevik Bloc of Nations conference in London and a Captive Nations Committee meeting in Washington DC in 1983.

After losing pre-selection for Manly in 1961, he resigned from the Liberal Party. He successfully contested the seat in the 1962 and 1965 state election elections as an Independent, and was readmitted to the Liberal Party in August 1966.

Darby also campaigned against juvenile hooliganism, poker machines, and the fluoridation of Sydney's water supply. He campaigned for the introduction of daylight saving, and the development of Bathurst as the new capital of New South Wales.

From 1960, support for Taiwan became another of Darby's causes, along with support for the Australian role in the Vietnam War. By 1973 he helped found an unofficial organisation known as the Australia-Free China Society, subsidised by both the Taiwanese Travel Service and the Taiwanese government. The Society established an office in 1974 to provide services for Australians visiting Taiwan. Darby was the editor and principal contributor to the Society's fortnightly newsletter, Australia-Free China News. The promotion of "Free China", along with his parliamentary duties, took up much of Darby's time during the Gough Whitlam years.

He retired from State parliament in 1978, after 33 years as a parliamentarian.

== Personal life ==
Darby married fellow teacher Esme Jean McKenzie in 1941 and moved to the Sydney beachside suburb of Manly in 1951, before purchasing "Whitehall", at nearby 37 White Street, Balgowlah in 1953 where he spent the rest of his life. Douglas and Esme had two sons (James and Michael), four daughters (Alison, Jennifer, Norma and Rosemary) and an adopted Chinese daughter (Mala).

He died on 22 August 1985 after undergoing heart surgery at the Seventh Day Adventist Hospital at Wahroonga.

His wife, Esme (1908–97), was educated at Fort Street Girls High School, Sydney Teachers College and the University of Sydney (graduating with a Bachelor of Arts in 1934). She worked as a teacher in the years 1928-41 and 1943-44. While living in the Manly area she supported The NSW Society for Crippled Children. After a failed bid in 1961 to gain pre-selection for the seat of Mackellar, she supported the Australian Housewives Association on the Captive Nations Week committee, accompanied her husband to several anti-communist conferences overseas and to Taiwan, and was a committee member of the Australia-Free China Society. In 1975 she was awarded an MBE for her promotion of youth welfare.

== Bibliography ==
The following books and pamphlets were written by Douglas Darby:

- Orphans of the War, Sydney: British Orphans Adoption Society, 1944
- A Brief Assessment of the Wyndham Report, Sydney, N.S.W.: s.n., 1959. Joint author: New South Wales. Committee Appointed to Survey Secondary Education in New South Wales. Report 1957.
- Lenin, Master or Monster, Belmore, N.S.W.: News Digest-International, 1970. "The text of an address given at the Wallace Theatre, Sydney University, April 17th 1970, on the occasion of the centenary of Lenin's birthday".
- The New Rat Track, Sydney: D. Darby, 1971
- The Natural Anti-Pollutionist, St. Ives, N.S.W.: South Pacific Federation of Natural Therapeutists, 1972
- Out of the Night, Taipei: Australia-Free China Society, 1975
- Oil for Lamps of Freedom, Taipei and Sydney: Australia-Free China Society, 1972; 2nd edition, Australia-Free China Society, 1977
- The Radiance of a Star, Sydney: Wentworth Books, 1972
- Why Croatia?, [Victoria]: D. Darby, c. 1975
- Slovakia's Quest for Freedom, Sydney: Australian Slovak's Association, 1978
- Australia's Debt to the Republic of China, Sydney: Australia-Free China Society, 1978
- Trust the Two Per Cent: A Comparative Study of Free China and Communist China, Cheltenham, United Kingdom: Centre for International Studies, 1982
- Christmas Means Giving, Balgowlah, N.S.W.: D. Darby, 1982
- The Forgotten Factor: The Twenty-Seventh Christmas Poem, Balgowlah, N.S.W.: D. Darby, 1983

New South Wales Legislative Assembly
| Preceded by Alfred Reid | Member for Manly; 1945 – 1978 | Succeeded by Alan Stewart |
