= Electoral district of Manly =

State electoral district in New South Wales, Australia

Manly New South Wales—Legislative Assembly
- Interactive map of district boundaries from the 2023 state election
- State: New South Wales
- Created: 1927
- MP: James Griffin
- Party: Liberal
- Namesake: Manly
- Electors: 61,062 (2023)
- Area: 26 km^{2} (10.0 sq mi)
- Demographic: Urban
- Coordinates: 33°47′31″S 151°15′40″E
Electorates around Manly:
Wakehurst	Wakehurst	Pacific Ocean
Willoughby	Manly	Pacific Ocean
North Shore	Vaucluse	Pacific Ocean

Manly is an electoral district of the Legislative Assembly in the Australian state of New South Wales, and covers a large portion of the Northern Beaches Council local government area. Created in 1927, although it has historically tended to be a Liberal-leaning seat, Manly has had a history of independent local members. It is represented by James Griffin for the Liberal Party, and was previously represented by the former Premier of New South Wales, Mike Baird.

On 23 January 2017, Baird resigned as Premier and member for Manly, triggering a by-election in the district which was held on 8 April and won by Liberal candidate James Griffin.

== Geography ==
On its current boundaries, Manly takes in the suburbs of Balgowlah, Balgowlah Heights, Clontarf, Curl Curl, Fairlight, Freshwater, Manly, Manly Vale, North Balgowlah, North Curl Curl, Queenscliff, Seaforth and parts of Brookvale and Dee Why.

== Members for Manly ==
Member	Party	Period
Alfred Reid	Nationalist	1927–1931
Alfred Reid	United Australia	1931–1944
Alfred Reid	Independent Democrat	1944–1945
Alfred Reid	Liberal	1945
Douglas Darby	Liberal	1945–1962
Douglas Darby	Independent Liberal	1962–1968
Douglas Darby	Liberal	1968–1978
Alan Stewart	Labor	1978–1984
David Hay	Liberal	1984–1991
Peter Macdonald	Independent	1991–1999
David Barr	Independent	1999–2007
Mike Baird	Liberal	2007–2017
James Griffin	Liberal	2017–present

== Election results ==
2023 New South Wales state election: Manly
Party	Candidate	Votes	%	±%
Liberal	James Griffin	23,764	45.0	−7.6
Independent	Joeline Hackman	14,365	27.2	+27.2
Labor	Jasper Thatcher	6,794	12.9	−5.4
Greens	Terry Le Roux	4,734	9.0	−9.4
Independent	Phillip Altman	1,395	2.6	+2.6
Animal Justice	Bailey Mason	1,062	2.0	−0.4
Sustainable Australia	Emanuele Paletto	711	1.3	−1.7
Total formal votes		52,825	97.8	+0.1
Informal votes		1,189	2.2	−0.1
Turnout		54,014	88.5	−0.9
Notional two-party-preferred count
Liberal	James Griffin	27,679	62.5	−2.1
Labor	Jasper Thatcher	16,592	37.5	+2.1
Two-candidate-preferred result
Liberal	James Griffin	25,541	54.8	−8.3
Independent	Joeline Hackman	21,027	45.2	+45.2
Liberal hold				
