= Manly Council =

Former local government area in New South Wales, Australia

- Local government area
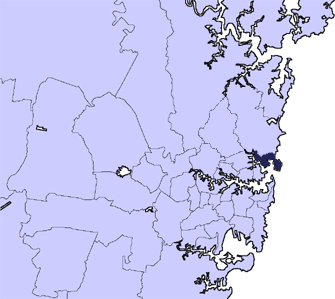
- Location in Metropolitan Sydney

- Coordinates: 33°48′S 151°17′E
- Country: Australia
- State: New South Wales
- Region: Northern Beaches
- Established: 6 January 1877
- Abolished: 12 May 2016
- Council seat: Manly Town Hall

Government
  - Mayor: Jean Hay AM

Area
  - Total: 15 km^{2} (5.8 sq mi)

Population
  - Total: 39,747 (2011 census)
  - Density: 2,649.8/km^{2} (6,863/sq mi)
- Parish: Manly Cove
- Website: Manly Council
LGAs around Manly Council
Ku-ring-gai	Warringah
Willoughby	Manly Council	Tasman Sea
Mosman	Sydney Harbour

Manly Council was a local government area on the northern beaches region of Sydney, New South Wales, Australia, first incorporated in 1877. On 12 May 2016, the Minister for Local Government announced that Manly Council would be subsumed into the newly formed Northern Beaches Council. The last mayor of Manly Council was Cr. Jean Hay AM, a member of the Liberal Party.

== Suburbs in the local government area ==
- Balgowlah
- Balgowlah Heights
- Clontarf
- Fairlight
- Manly
- Seaforth

== History ==
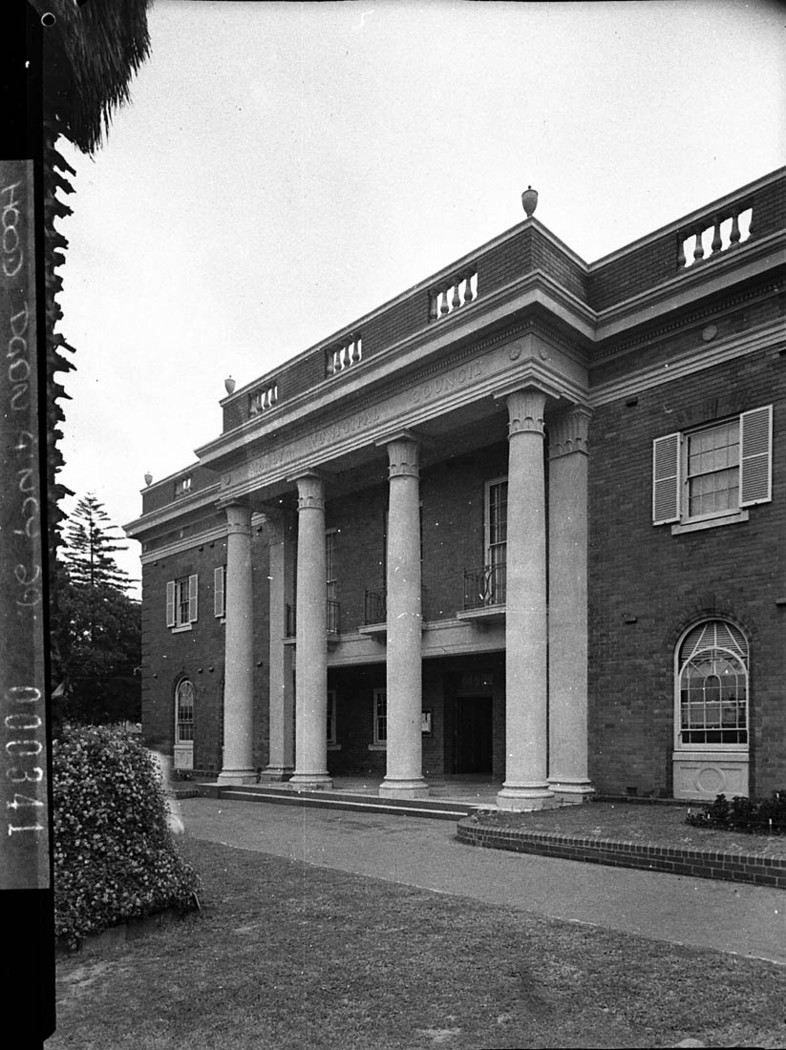
Manly Town Hall, seat of the council from 1937 to 2016.

Manly was first incorporated on 6 January 1877 as the Municipal District of Manly, and met for the first time on 15 February 1877, when the first mayor was elected, Thomas Rowe. The council first met in temporary premises including the original Ivanhoe Hotel in Ivanhoe Park, until 1909, and from then on Llangollen, the former mansion of William Howard Rolfe at the end of the Corso, served as the new council chambers. There were no wards until October 1890 when the council petitioned to be divided into three wards, which was proclaimed in December 1890: The Steyne Ward to the north, Fairlight Ward to the southeast and Wentworth Ward to the east.

Manly was the only local government authority on the Northern Beaches until the proclamation of Warringah Shire in 1906, with the Burnt Bridge Creek forming the northern boundary with Warringah. From 1906 the council became the Municipality of Manly. In August 1909, the council petitioned for the abolition of wards in favour of one at-large electorate, which was subsequently proclaimed. In 1918, seven of the council's alderman who had accepted free ferry passes from the Port Jackson and Manly Steamship Company were charged and found guilty by a magistrate of contravening the Local Government Act and disqualified to act as aldermen. As the council only had a total of nine alderman, there was a period when the council did not have quorum and therefore did not function. The convictions were overturned on appeal.

In April 1927, Alderman Alfred Reid passed through a motion to petition the NSW Government for upgrading Manly to City status. This petition was rejected by Minister for Local Government Eric Spooner in May 1938, citing that Manly did not fulfill the requirements of such a status. In response, Mayor Aubrey Hanson-Norman upheld Manly's arguments for such a petition: "We have a population of about 10,000 and the revenue including the electricity undertaking is £180,000 [...] Geographically too, Manly is more or less separated from other parts of the metropolitan area." After a long and protracted debate over the construction of a purpose-built town hall, in February 1937 the old Town Hall had been demolished and a Neo-Georgian revival Town Hall by Samuel Reginald Maisey of the prominent local firm Trenchard Smith & Maisey, which served as the seat of the council until 2016.

From 1951 to 1980, the Mackellar County Council operated on the Northern Beaches as an electricity and gas supplier and retailer as a joint operation of Manly Municipal Council and Warringah Shire Council. The council became known as Manly Council on 1 July 1993 following the enactment of the Local Government Act, 1993 which also stipulated that the term 'Town Clerk' be replaced with 'General Manager' and 'Alderman' be replaced by 'Councillor'.

=== 2016 amalgamation proposal ===
A 2015 review of local government boundaries by the NSW Government Independent Pricing and Regulatory Tribunal recommended that the Manly Council merge with adjoining councils. The government considered two proposals. The first proposed a merger of Manly and Mosman Councils and parts of Warringah Council to form a new council with an area of 49 square kilometres (19 sq mi) and support a population of approximately 153,000.

The alternative, proposed by Warringah Council on 23 February 2016, was for an amalgamation of the Pittwater, Manly and Warringah councils, which was proclaimed as the Northern Beaches Council on 12 May 2016.

== Demographics ==
At the 2011 Census, there were 39,747 people in the Manly local government area, of these 48.8% were male and 51.2% were female. Aboriginal and Torres Strait Islander people made up 0.3% of the population. The median age of people in the Manly Council area was 37 years. Children aged 0 – 14 years made up 18.9% of the population and people aged 65 years and over made up 13.5% of the population. Of people in the area aged 15 years and over, 48.5% were married and 10.3% were either divorced or separated.

Population growth in the Manly Council area between the 2001 Census and the 2006 Census was 1.55% and in the subsequent five years to the 2011 Census, population growth was 7.11%. When compared with total population growth of Australia for the same periods, being 5.78% and 8.32% respectively, population growth in the Manly local government area was lower than the national average. The median weekly income for residents within the Manly Council area was significantly higher than the national average.

Selected historical census data for Manly local government area
Census year		2001	2006	2011
Population	Estimated residents on Census night	36,544	37,110	39,747
Population	LGA rank in terms of size within New South Wales		57	
Population	% of New South Wales population			0.57%
Population	% of Australian population	0.19%	0.19%	▼0.18%
Cultural and language diversity				
Ancestry, top responses	Australian			21.5%
Ancestry, top responses	English			30.5%
Ancestry, top responses	Irish			9.7%
Ancestry, top responses	Scottish			8.0%
Ancestry, top responses	German			2.9%
Language, top responses (other than English)	French	0.8%	▲0.9	▲1.1%
Language, top responses (other than English)	German	0.8%	0.8%	▲1.0%
Language, top responses (other than English)	Italian	0.8%	0.8%	▲0.9%
Language, top responses (other than English)	Greek	0.9%	▼0.9%	▼0.8%
Language, top responses (other than English)	Spanish	n/c	n/c	▲0.8%
Religious affiliation				
Religious affiliation, top responses	No religion	17.5%	▲20.9%	▲27.8%
Religious affiliation, top responses	Catholic	24.2%	▲25.0%	25.0%
Religious affiliation, top responses	Anglican	26.4%	▼25.0%	▼22.6%
Religious affiliation, top responses	Presbyterian and Reformed	4.0%	▼3.5%	▼2.9%
Religious affiliation, top responses	Uniting Church	4.4%	▼3.4%	▼2.8%
Median weekly incomes				
Personal income	Median weekly personal income		A$790	A$985
Personal income	% of Australian median income		169.5%	170.7%
Family income	Median weekly family income		A$1,705	A$2,649
Family income	% of Australian median income		166.0%	178.9%
Household income	Median weekly household income		A$2,262	A$2,221
Household income	% of Australian median income		193.2%	180.0%

== Council ==
=== Final composition and election method ===
Manly Council was composed of nine councillors, including the mayor, for a fixed four-year term of office. The mayor was directly elected from 1995 to 2016 while the eight other councillors were elected proportionally as one ward. The last election was held on 8 September 2012, and the final makeup of the council, including the mayor, was as follows:

Councillor	Party	Notes
Jean Hay	Liberal	Mayor 1999–2004, 2008–2016
James Griffin	Liberal	Deputy Mayor 2015–2016
Barbara Aird	Manly Independents	Deputy Mayor 2005–2006
Candy Bingham	Independent	Elected to Northern Beaches Council Manly Ward, 2017.
Adele Heasman	Liberal	Deputy Mayor 2013–2014
Alan Le Surf	Liberal	Deputy Mayor 2011–2013
Steve Pickering	Liberal	Deputy Mayor 2014–2015
Cathy Griffin	The Greens	
Hugh Burns	Manly Independents	

== Council seal ==
Manly was the first council on the northern beaches, being incorporated in 1877, but it is not known when it adopted the council seal. The image of two indigenous men standing by the shore watching the approach of the first Europeans to visit Manly in 1788, has been modified several times over the decades, with the earliest found version dating from 1905. This image is a direct reference to the naming of "Manly" by the first governor of New South Wales, Arthur Phillip, who visited on 21 January 1788, who noted that the "[Manly aboriginals'] confidence and manly behaviour induced me to give the name Manly Cove to this place".

In 1952 the new Mackellar County Council commissioned the President of the Manly and Warringah District Historical Society, Percy Walter Gledhill, to design a council seal and Gledhill's design included this image.

A later Manly council seal from 1913 omitted the approaching Europeans, but they returned in the last version, which was designed by Susan Hammond and introduced in 1990.

== Sister cities ==
Manly had sister city relationships with a number of cities around the world:

- Taiji, Japan, Japan
- Jing'an, China
- Bath, England, United Kingdom
- (Timor-Leste) Oecusse, East Timor
- Huntington Beach, California, United States of America

Manly also had three friendship cities:

- Odawara, Kanagawa, Japan
- Yeongdo-gu, Busan, South Korea
- (Australia) Gunnedah, New South Wales
