= Sydney Harbour defences =

Australian coastal batteries and fixed defences

Coordinates: 33°50′18″S 151°15′21″E

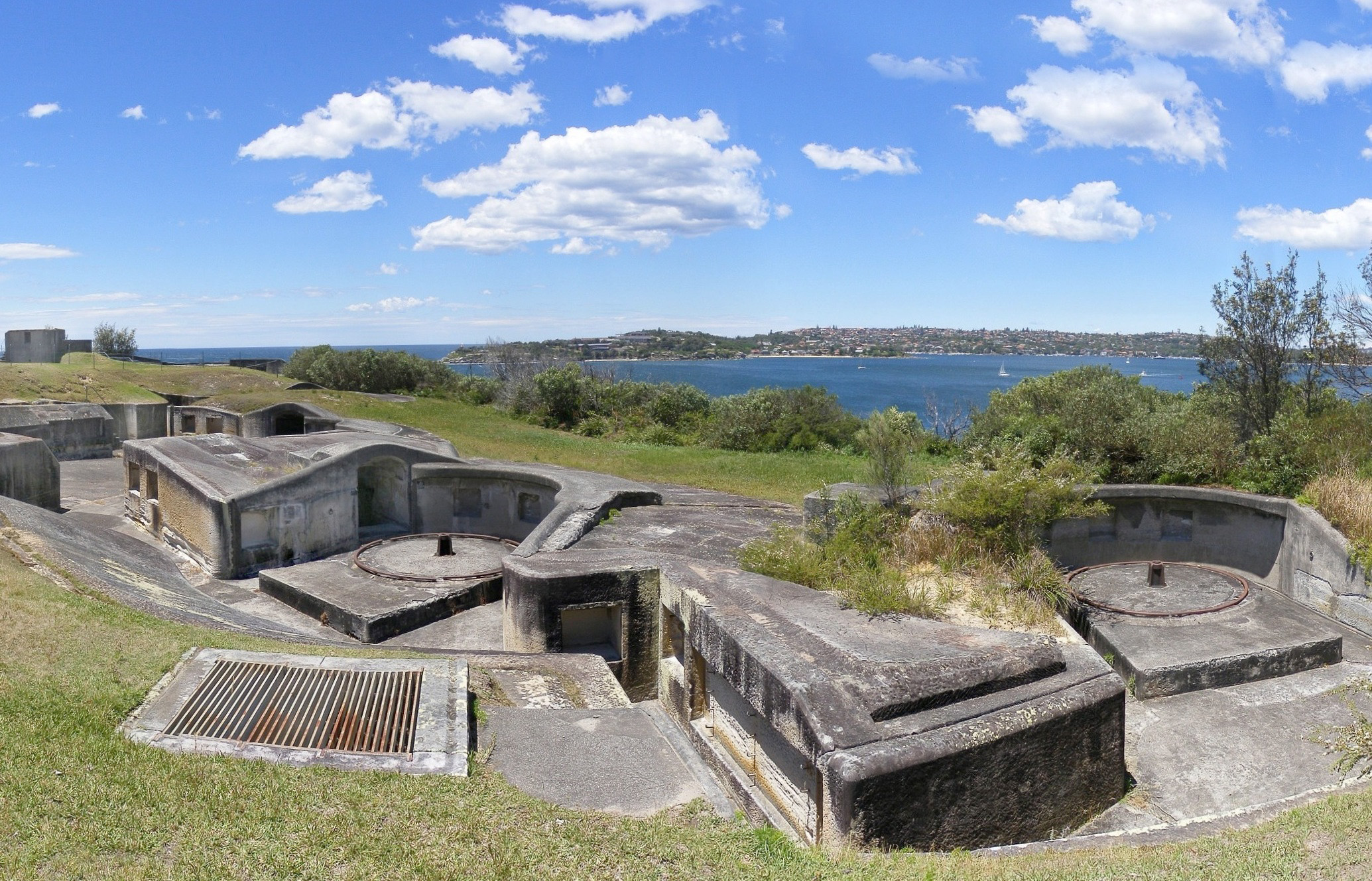
Gun emplacements overlooking Sydney Heads & Watsons Bay

Sydney Harbour was protected by coastal batteries and other fixed defences from the early 19th century until the 1960s. These defences were constructed to protect the Australian city of Sydney from attack by enemy warships and submarines.

== Pre-Federation defences ==
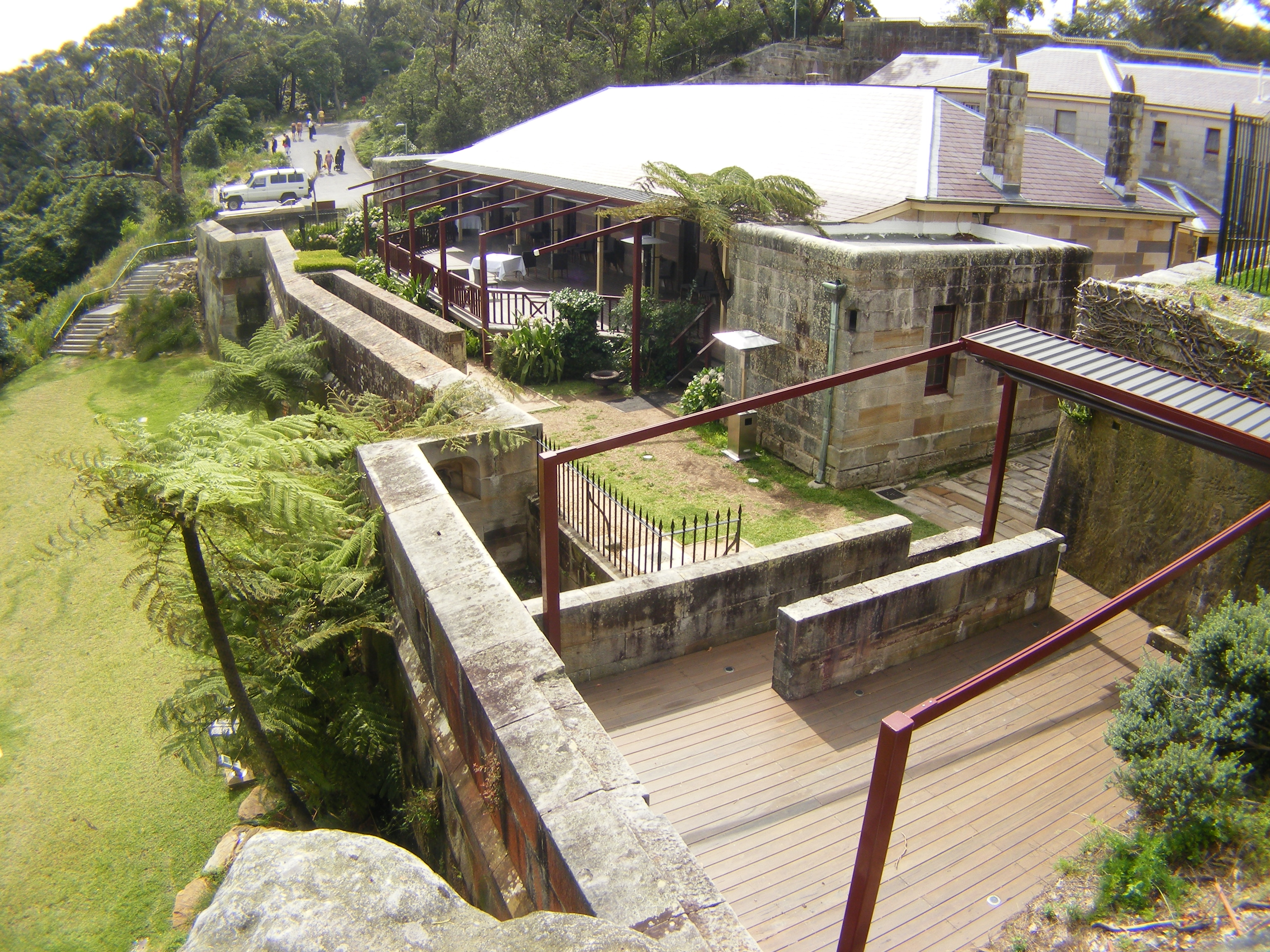
The Georges Head Battery (1871)

Sydney's earliest fortifications were built around Sydney Cove to protect the new colony of Sydney from attacks from non-British ships or convict uprisings. In 1791 the Dawes Point Battery was meant to be the first line of defence against an attack by the Spanish Empire, while Fort Macquarie was built on the site of an earlier fort established in 1798.

A gun emplacement was built in 1801 on Middle Head (north of Obelisk Bay) during the Napoleonic Wars, as well as another one at Georges Head. Fort Phillip was also built to protect from a potential French invasion in 1804, as well as following the Castle Hill convict rebellion the same year. More permanent fortifications were built during the first half of the 19th century in response to feared foreign attacks with new threats to the British Empire, including Napoleon's French troops in 1810, and the Russian Pacific Fleet in the 1850s (during the Crimean War). In the meantime two American warships (sloops of war Peacock and Vincennes) entered the harbour unannounced on 30 November 1839, under the cover of darkness. Although only a courtesy visit, the event demonstrated the settlement's vulnerability to attack and highlighted awareness of its isolation and wealth. Garden Island had fortifications built in the 1820s, while Bradleys Head started building in 1840. Construction of Fort Denison began in 1841, although the fort was not completed until 1857.

Sydney's defences were expanded following the withdrawal (Cardwell Reforms) of British soldiers from Australia during the 1870s. This prompted the construction of four sets of fortifications on Georges Heights and around other parts of the harbour, the Middle Head Fortifications, the Georges Head Battery, and a smaller fort located on Bradleys Head were constructed during this period and upgraded in the 1880s on the advice of British experts. They were designed to attack enemy ships as they attempted entry into Sydney Harbour. Some of these forts were, at the time, built from an outdated design.

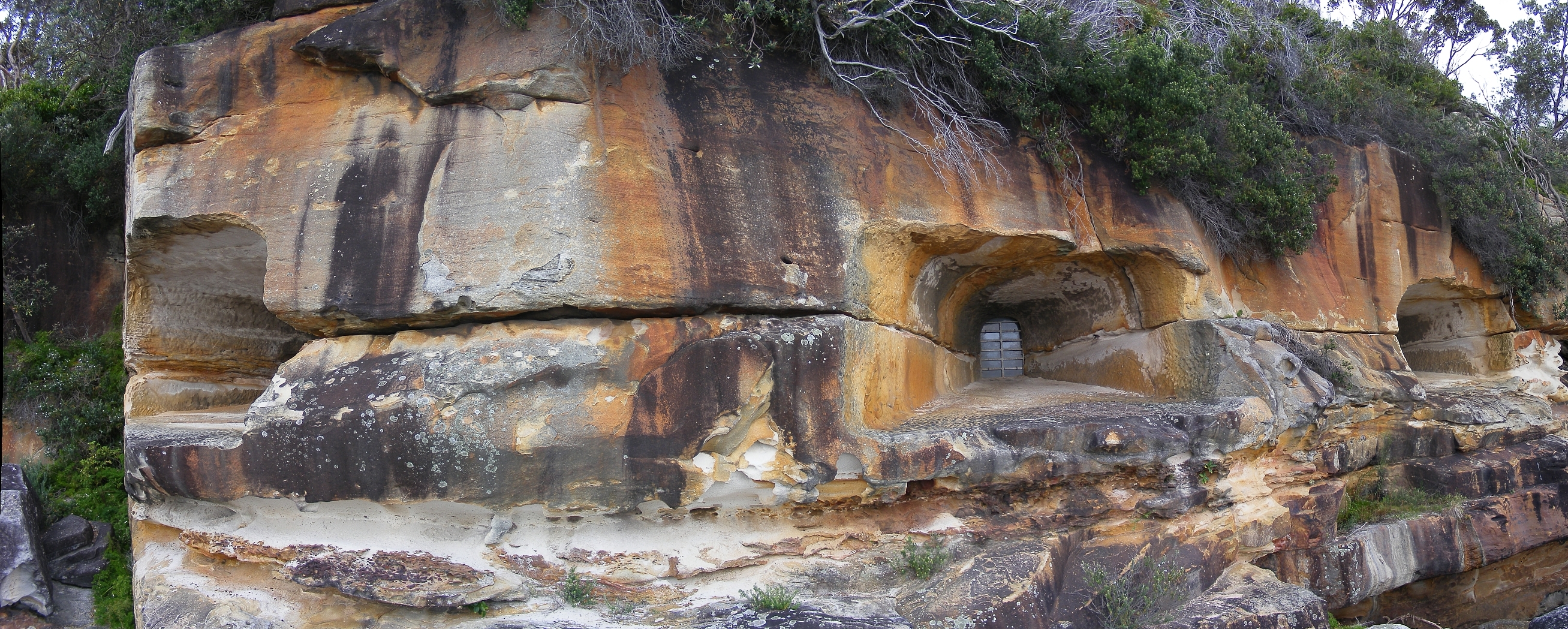
The Beehive Casemate was carved into the cliff face at Obelisk Bay on Sydney Harbour in 1871

Minefields were laid across the main shipping channels of Port Jackson from 1876 to 1922 and a base was built at Chowder Bay for the submarine miners (Clifton Gardens). From Georges Head, miners watched for ships entering the harbour. Their job was to explode the mine closest to an approaching enemy ship. Each underwater mine was attached to an electric cable that ran up the cliff to the firing post.

The work of the submarine miners was secretive, technical and dangerous. During a demonstration in 1891, a crowd of several thousand watched as a terrible accident killed four miners and injured another eight. The Submarine Mining Corps was dismantled in 1922.

Sydney's defences were expanded over the last decades of the 19th century and eventually incorporated a fort on Bare Island to defend the approaches to Botany Bay.

== World War II ==
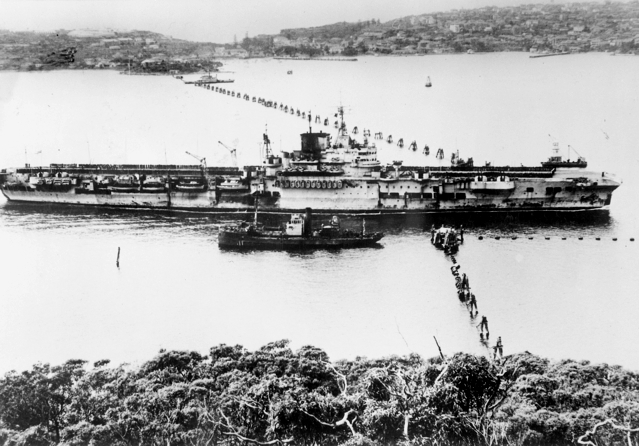
The British aircraft carrier HMS Formidable passing through the Sydney Harbour anti-submarine boom net in 1945

Sydney's defences were not expanded from their pre-Federation condition until the 1920s. During the 1920s a number of well-constructed fortifications were built to protect Sydney. Sydney's defences were further expanded following the outbreak of World War II and were considerably augmented once Japan entered the war. While Sydney's anti-submarine defences were not yet complete at the time of the attack on Sydney Harbour on the night of 31 May 1942, they were successful in sinking two of the three Japanese midget submarines which attempted to enter the harbour; one submarine fired two torpedoes at a warship, both of which missed, one hitting another ship.

== The end of coastal defence ==
Following the end of the Japanese threat to Australia Sydney's defences were reduced from 1944. The last fortifications were not decommissioned until the 1960s, however. While Sydney is no longer protected by fixed defences, a high proportion of the Australian Defence Force is based within the greater Sydney region and could be called on to protect the city during an emergency. During the 2000 Sydney Olympics security for the harbour was provided by Special Forces, Navy Clearance Divers and warships.

Current major ADF facilities in Sydney include:

- Navy
  - HMAS Kuttabul
  - HMAS Penguin
- Army
  - Victoria Barracks, Sydney (Headquarters Forces Command)
  - Holsworthy Barracks
  - Steele Barracks Moorebank
- Air Force
  - RAAF Base Richmond
