= Bradleys Head Fortification Complex =

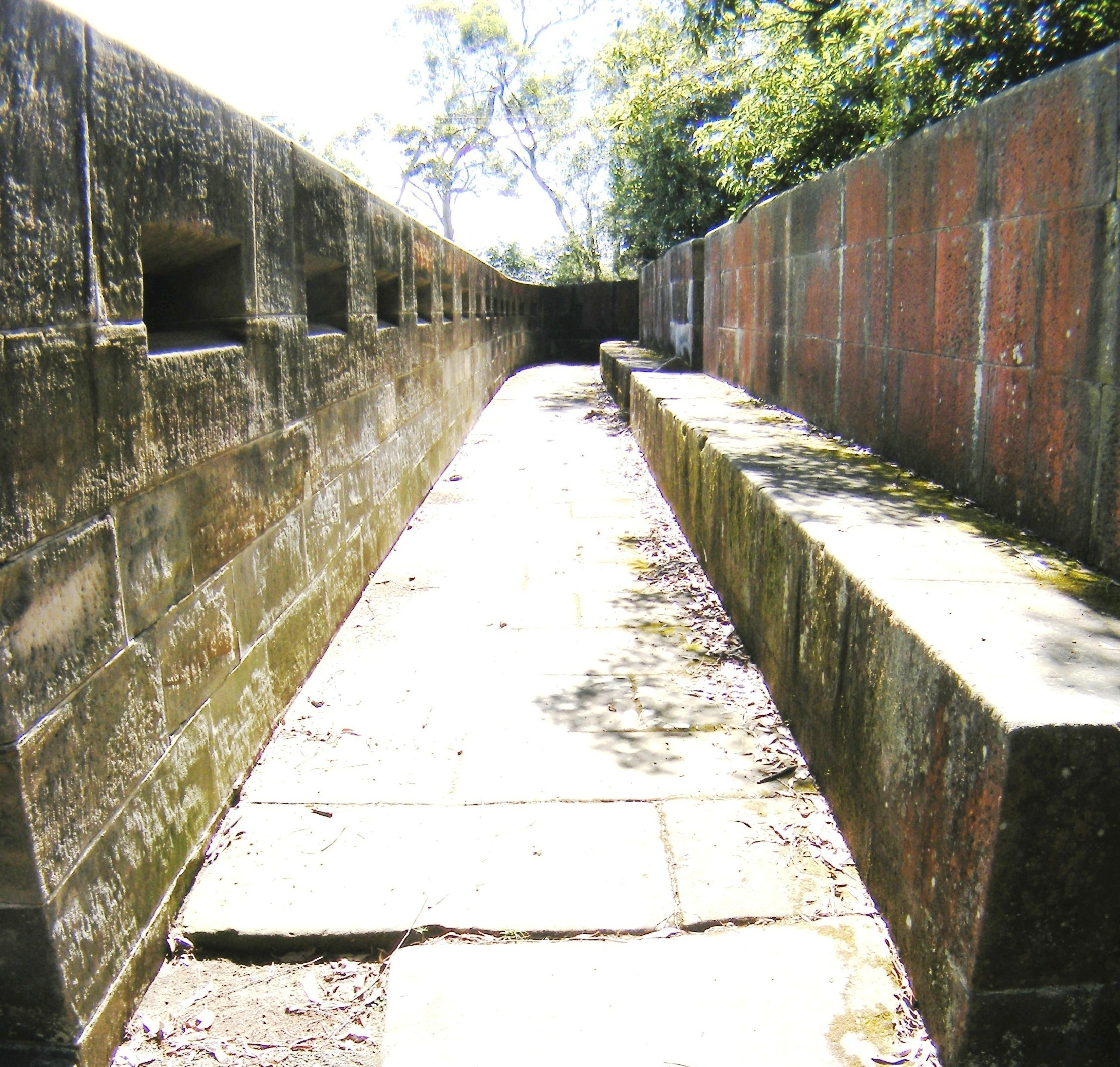
- The main firing wall of the Bradleys Head Fortification Complex

- Location within inner Sydney
- 33°51′10″S 151°14′45″E
- Location: Bradleys Head Road (within Sydney Harbour NP), Mosman, Municipality of Mosman, New South Wales, Australia

History
- Built: 1840–1934

Site notes
- Architect: Government engineers
- Owner: Office of Environment & Heritage

New South Wales Heritage Register
- Official name: Bradleys Head Fortification Complex; Bradleys Head Forts; HMAS Sydney 1 Mast and Associated Memorials
- Type: State heritage (built)
- Designated: 30 August 2010
- Reference no.: 1838
- Type: Battery
- Category: Defence

The Bradleys Head Fortification Complex is a heritage-listed former mast and defensive battery and military fortification and now war memorial and recreational area located at Bradleys Head Road within the Sydney Harbour National Park in the Sydney suburb of Mosman, New South Wales, Australia. It was designed by Government engineers and built from 1840 to 1934. It is also known as Bradleys Head Forts and HMAS Sydney 1 Mast and Associated Memorials. The property is owned by the Office of Environment & Heritage. It was added to the New South Wales State Heritage Register on 30 August 2010.

The small fort is located on the northern side of Sydney Harbour, just south of Taronga Park Zoo, and the fortification formed part of a total defence system for Sydney Harbour and recalls a period when the colony of New South Wales became increasingly aware of its isolation and wealth.

== History ==
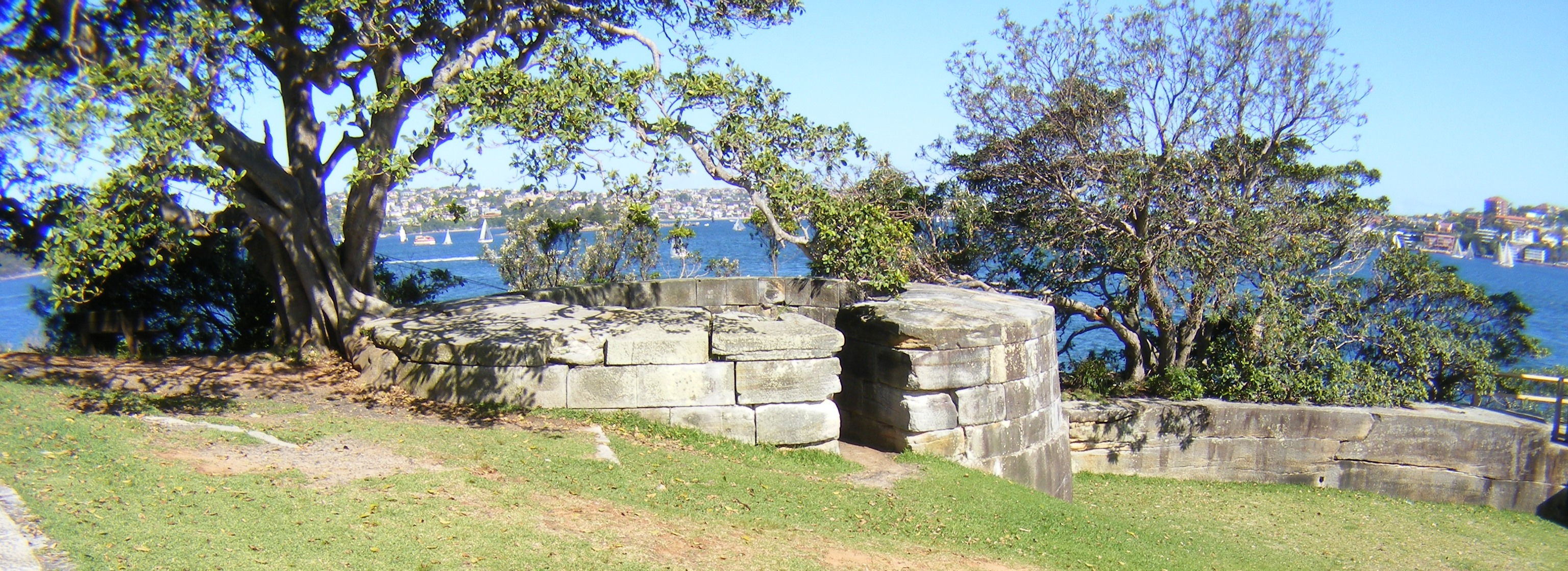
Gun emplacement overlooking Port Jackson.

=== Development of the fort ===
Bradleys Head is the site of two fortification complexes which formed part of a total defence system for Sydney Harbour. The first settlers established two defensive batteries at Dawes Point and Bennelong Point to protect the colony. They were equipped with naval guns and covered the entrance to Sydney Cove. The batteries were manned by marines of the First Fleet until the arrival of the first contingent of soldiers from the NSW Corps with the Second Fleet in 1790.

In 1801 additional batteries were established by Governor King at Garden Island and on Georges Head in response to the Napoleonic Wars in Europe, thereby covering the approaches to the settlement. A large stone walled fort commenced on the crown of Observatory Hill in 1804. It was named Fort Phillip in 1805. When Governor Macquarie took office in 1810, the outer batteries were neglected and in poor condition. He decided to reconcentrate the defences of the settlement at Fort Phillip, Dawes Point and Bennelong Point. These three positions remained the defensive backbone of Sydney until the 1840s.

In September 1839, during the office of Governor Gipps, Captain George Barney, the first Colonial Engineer, put forward a proposal for improving the defences, including construction of batteries and permanent Blockhouses for the defence of the ports of Sydney, Newcastle, Wollongong, Port Macquarie and Port Phillip. Requests for funds were sent to the Board of Ordinance in the United Kingdom. Work using convict labour commenced at Bradleys Head and Fort Denison in August 1840 in anticipation of a successful response. Funding was refused in October 1840. A subsequent representation was more successful, although this approval would not be received until March 1842, more than eighteen months after commencement of works at Bradleys Head. In the meantime two American warships (sloop of war Peacock and sloop of war Vincennes) entered the harbour unannounced on 30 November 1839, under the cover of darkness. Although only a courtesy visit, the event demonstrated the settlement's vulnerability to attack and highlighted awareness of its isolation and wealth. Construction of the fort began in 1840-42 and consisted of a gun pit and firing wall that was built out of large blocks of sandstone and carved partly from the original rock that was located on site. The earlier stages of construction during this period were done with the supervision of Major George Barney, a Commanding Royal Engineer who used hired labour that was supplied by Governor Gipps.

By 1850 the Bradleys Head battery was the only one to be completed. Muzzle loading 24-pounder guns had been installed in 1840 and a sandstone wharf built in conjunction with the fort was being used to transport equipment and supplies from Circular Quay across to the soldiers. Stockades to house the convict labour used at Bradleys Head had already been removed. In 1853 plans were made to construct batteries at Inner South head, Middle Head and Georges Head, with work commencing late that same year. The outbreak of the Crimean War in 1854 renewed interest in the defence of Sydney and Governor Denison presented a revised plan to the government in 1855 which advocated greater focus on defending the area immediate to Sydney and the completion of Fort Denison, enlargement of the Dawes Point and Fort Macquarie emplacements, and for batteries to be developed on Kirribilli Point and Mrs Macquarie's Point. The plan was approved and the works virtually completed by 1858. The fort at Bradleys Head ceased to be used from 1859.

On 23 August 1870 the last of the British troops departed and the colony was forced to consider maintaining its own defences. NSW Government reports in 1865 and 1870 saw the outer line of defence given priority and construction commenced on new fortifications at Middle Head, Georges Head, South Head, Steel Point and Lower Georges Heights Commanding Position. Work commenced in late 1870. The new works at Bradleys Head above the earlier emplacement saw the complex now consist of three gun pits, a riflemen's gallery and interconnecting tunnels, trenches and galleries. These were constructed under the supervision of Colonial Architect James Barnet. The barracks were constructed from large sandstone blocks and carved out of the existing rock on the headland. The first guns were in place by 1871. This most recent addition consisted of three gun pits and had connecting galleries for the riflemen. Both were to provide defensive fire across Sydney Harbour if required. A further report by Sir William Jervois in 1875 recommended upgrading certain armaments and facilities. Construction and re-equipment of outer fortifications continued throughout the 1880s.

In 1871 the fortification received an additional barracks. The 1871 barracks were designed and constructed under the direction of James Barnet, a colonial architect.

Most of the harbour side emplacements were improved with the addition of breech loading guns in the 1880s and 1890s. Therefore, with the outbreak of World War I in 1914 only minor improvements to the weaponry were required to preserve the readiness of the outer harbour defences. The forts and batteries of the inner line of defence - Bradleys Head, Kirribilli Point, Mrs Macquarie's Point, Fort Macquarie and Dawes Point were largely non-operational by that time. Bradleys Head had ceased operation in 1903 and the remainder as early as 1870.

Harbour defence strategy during World War II was based on the seaward facing coastal batteries. The inner harbour defence emplacements were dismantled after the war. By 1961 all coastal batteries were declared obsolete following the development of jet aircraft and guided missiles and most of the former military reserves were transferred to the NSW National Parks and Wildlife Service for conservation and public recreation. Others have since been transferred to other government agencies such as the Sydney Harbour Federation Trust.

==== HMAS Sydney mast and associated memorials ====
HMAS Sydney I is recognised as one of the most distinguished Royal Australian Navy (RAN) warships of World War One. It was a Chatham Class light cruiser built in Glasgow, Scotland and delivered to the RAN in 1913. In October 1914, after spending the first period of the war in New Guinea and Pacific waters, HMAS Sydney I began escort duties off the Western Australian coast accompanying the first Australian troop ship to the Middle East. On 9 November 1914 HMAS Sydney I was called away from the escort to investigate an SOS from Direction Island in the Cocos Keeling Islands group. This resulted in a victorious engagement with the German raider SMS Emden which saw Emden eventually run aground on Keeling Island. This victory marked the RAN's first ship to ship engagement and its first victory. The Emden victory and later deeds of the ship and crew were a source of pride in Australia and inspired the use of the HMAS Sydney I silhouette as a trademark on a series of domestic items as diverse as flour and toilet cisterns.

In general, recognition of the importance of the victory over SMS Emden has often been overshadowed by events such as Gallipoli and Kokoda since World War II. However, internationally, the battle continues to be considered the most significant cruiser battle of World War I. Had the Emden attacked the 1st AIF convoy at night, as its captain planned, many of the soldiers destined to fight at places such as Gallipoli, are likely to have ended up in the water. This act saw HMAS Sydney I presented with a silver dining plate from British Naval Commander Lord Nelson's 1803 Copenhagen silver setting. The setting had been purchased with prize money from Lloyd's of London given to Nelson. The 36 pieces were sold by his descendant Emma Hamilton in 1830 when she filed for bankruptcy. The set was purchased by the Ephraim family who donated the setting to the British Admiralty on the proviso that one piece each should go to the ships that most distinguished themselves in World War I. The first piece was presented to HMAS Sydney I for her destruction of SMS Emden.

The steel tripod mast which is the primary element of the memorial was the foremast of HMAS Sydney I. It was installed on the Sydney in 1917, replacing the original timber foremast. The timber foremast had been constructed in three sections (mainmast, topmast and topgallant), and included a lookout post and gun direction platform on the mainmast. The mast on the memorial was the ship's mast during the Emden action. This new mast was fitted to overcome the weaknesses associated with the conventionally rigged timber mast, in particular the threat of ice forming on the rigging and ratlines during winter patrols in the North Sea and the additional load, and resulting decrease to the ship's stability this created.

In September 1916, Sydney and HMAS Melbourne were transferred to the 2nd Light Cruiser Squadron for duties with the Royal Navy's Grand Fleet in the North Sea. In company with HMS Southampton and Dublin, they undertook patrol, escort and screening duties. While on patrol on 4 May 1917, Sydney and the other vessels accompanying her were attacked by the German zeppelin L43. The L43 dropped ten to twelve bombs on the Sydney, none of which hit the ship, which responded with a heavy barrage of anti-aircraft fire. The L43 escaped undamaged.

Later in 1917, Sydney was fitted with an aircraft launching platform and equipped with a Sopwith Ships Pup fighter. On 1 June 1918, while patrolling in the Heligoland Bight, Sydney and Melbourne launched their aircraft to engage two German reconnaissance aircraft. Sydney's fighter destroyed one of the enemy aircraft. HMAS Sydney I was present at the surrender of the German High Seas Fleet on 21 November 1918. She returned to Australia on 19 July 1919. After the war, Sydney carried out routine fleet duties until she was paid off in 1928.

The mast was removed during the breaking up of HMAS Sydney I at Cockatoo Island following its decommissioning in 1928. In 1934 the Mayor of Mosman purchased the mast (at Commonwealth expense) and erected it astride the nationally significant 1839 defence fortifications at Bradleys Head as a memorial to those who died in the Emden action. The idea for the installation of the mast came from local resident Norman Ellison, who proposed its dedication coincide with a visit by the Duke of Gloucester in November 1934. The decision to undertake the project was supported by a variety of charitable and historical associations, as well as naval and military associations. These included the local scouts and guides, Chamber of Commerce, Red Cross, Parents and Citizen's Association, the Navy League, Ex Naval Men's association, the Georges Heights military forces and the Returned Soldiers and Sailors League.

The Melbourne Argus newspaper reported that while there may be some ceremony on 9 November 1934 to mark the destruction of the Emden, the chief ceremony associated with it would take place on 24 November with the breaking of the flag on the recently erected memorial at Bradleys Head."Column - Sydney Day by Day". The Argus. Melbourne, Victoria. 26 October 1934. p. 6. On 12 November 1964 the HMAS Sydney I mast was dedicated as an official memorial to the memory of those who served in the RAN and the nineteen naval ships lost in service. Three trees were also planted during the dedication ceremony to honour the officers and crews of:

- HMAS Sydney II (lost in action on 19 November 1941) - planted by the Minister for Lands.
- HMAS Perth (lost in Sunda Strait on 1 March 1942) - planted by Rear Admiral McNicoll.
- HMAS Canberra (lost in action off Savo Island on 9 August 1942) - planted by Ald Chambers on behalf of Mosman Council.

It was originally proposed to plant sixteen additional trees along the road to commemorate the other 16 ships lost in action. This was never undertaken.

On 18 November 1991 an additional memorial with plaques was constructed immediately opposite the memorial mast by the Governor of New South Wales Rear Admiral Peter Sinclair in honour of those who served on the HMAS Sydney ships and in memory of those who perished while serving on them. Electric lighting to illuminate the mast was installed during maintenance works and repainting of the mast in 2000. This was undertaken as a joint project by numerous parties including the National Parks and Wildlife Service, Mosman RSL, Councillor Jim Reid, Veterans Affairs, the Harbour Master and the Waterways Authority. The mast had been unlit at night since it was first erected at the site, requiring any flags flown from its halyards to be drawn at dusk in line with tradition. However the lighting of a set of 1000 candlepower lamps by Prime Minister John Howard on 14 June 2000 has allowed the mast to be floodlit throughout the night and the mast to carry the Australian Flag continually. Two other masts were to fly the City of Sydney flag and the White Ensign on ceremonial occasions. Maritime Commander, RADM John Lord, had the honour of breaking open the flag at the ceremony.

In 2004 the HMAS Canberra memorial tree died and was removed. Rear Admiral Rowen Moffitt AM, RAN replanted the HMAS Canberra brush box tree as part of a memorial service on 4 August 2004.

On 26 June 2007 the RAN announced that a new naval tradition would commence that day requiring all Australian and foreign naval vessels proceeding into Sydney Harbour to render ceremonial honours to the HMAS Sydney I Memorial Mast. The ceremony consists of bringing the ship's company on the upper decks to attention, and then "piping" the Mast. "Piping" is the prolonged sounding of the Boatswain's call, a special naval whistle that was once the only method other than the human voice of passing orders to the men on board ship. The ceremony represents a mark of respect for, and recognition of the Australian officers, sailors and ships lost at sea and in combat.

The announcement was an initiative of the Commander Australian Fleet, RADM Davyd Thomas AM, CSC, RAN coinciding with the 94th anniversary of the commissioning of HMAS Sydney I. Commander Thomas stated that "It is appropriate that in a regular and formal way we recognise our heritage and demonstrate a mark of respect for the sacrifices of naval personnel that have played such a significant part in shaping this nation, particularly those that have laid down their lives. It helps remind us where we come from." This was followed in December 2007 by the raising of a permanently flying ceremonial Australian White Ensign in remembrance of "sailors and ship lost in conflict".

The RAN now considers the memorial the premier naval monument in Australia. It is the only memorial in Australia at which ceremonial piping is required by naval ships when entering the harbour. This honour is considered the equivalent in importance to the ceremonial respect given to HMS Victory at Portsmouth, England by passing naval ships. HMS Victory is the most famous warship of the Royal Navy and the world's oldest commissioned ship, built 1759–65.

The HMAS Sydney 1 Memorial has now been a visible part of Sydney Harbour for over sixty years, marking the end of the western harbour channel. It has an important visual role in the landscape for Sydneysiders and visitors alike, emphasised by its depiction in contemporary images and artwork of the harbour a role for Sydney. Other monuments utilising parts of HMAS Sydney I include part of the bow at Milson's Point, Sydney, the original timber mast on Spectacle Island, Sydney Harbour and a derrick used as a flagpole in the Victory Memorial Gardens in Wagga Wagga.

== Description ==
The 1840 fort was cut into the sandstone bedrock outcrop on the tip of the headland and included a barbette gun pit at the eastern end. Approximately half the parapet is constructed from cut bedrock and the remainder built up from sandstone blocks. The surviving remains consist of the parapet wall, a firing step along the base of the parapet, a terreplein (level inner area of the battery) and a rear wall. The parapet and firing step are visible.

The parapet is a semi-circular arc, with the total length on the inner side of the parapet being 38.83 metres (127.4 ft). Across the chord of the arc the distance is 23.4 metres (77 ft). The top of the parapet has been cut to form a sloped surface (glacis), and the outer side has been left rough, except for some dressing to the stop anyone climbing up the outer face. At the western end the line of parapet has been continued for two metres at a later period, using poor quality stonework and cement.

=== 1854 fort ===
There is a small circular bastion at the eastern end of the fort. The floor contains a 1.250-millimetre (0.0492 in) diameter depression which was central for a central pivot for the gun carriage. In addition to the floor the parapet wall and firing step are still extant. The mortar used in the parapet is soft and contains shell and rounded quartz grains. That used in the bastion is of a similar colour, but is harder and contains no visible shell or quartz grains. the stonework is different in execution in the bastion and appears to be of poorer quality than that used in the parapet.

=== 68 Pounder fort 1871-c. 1900 ===
The battery consists of five circular gun emplacements connected by open trenches that are either cut cur from bedrock or are built up with stone masonry. There is a series of underground rooms which served as magazines and shell-stores. The gun emplacements have 68-pounder guns mounted on traversing platforms. One platform appears to be original but it is unclear if it was originally located at Bradleys Head. Two platforms are replicas. Each of the gun emplacements consists of a circular pit 6.18 metres in diameter. Inside these are two concentric traversing races, 5.48 and 2.20 metres in diameter. The wall of the pits each contain five pulley rings in recesses. All pits have a cut legend "V R 1871" on the wall. The iron fittings are generally complete and standard pattern arms and equipment recesses for all guns are present. A loop holed wall guards the entry to the battery along the road from the north. The wall is built of well cut sandstone blocks in an L shape with 15 embrasures (loop holes) for rifles.

The entrance to the underground section has been roofed over. Later landscaping of the area includes a slight lowering of the ground level to below parapet height, making an unusual appearance. Paths are located around the emplacements.

=== Defensive ditch ===
The defensive ditch cuts the 1871 battery off from the remainder of the headland and was probably constructed as part of the 1871 works. It has been cut through both bedrock and soil. The width of the ditch varies but averages approximately six metres across at the top and four metres deep. To the north east of the 68-pounder battery is a cut sandstone blockhouse (a small, isolated fort in the form of a single building) within the ditch, commanding two stretches of the ditch.

=== Potential underground tank ===
A cement patch with an iron cover exposed near the battery is likely to be and early tank.

=== Wharf ===
A sandstone rubble construction with concrete deck. On site of original wharf used to transport materials from city to Bradleys Head.

=== Mast and memorials ===
The memorial mast is located on the southernmost tip of Bradleys Head astride the 1840 fortification. It is situated in a curved, landscaped area bounded in the south by the harbour shoreline and Bradleys Head Road in the north. Beyond the road is the asphalt car park and then bushland and remnant fortifications.

Primarily a grassy location, there are three memorial brush box trees close to the pedestrian path, each with a small sandstone plinth and with plaque commemorating one of three lost ships - HMAS Sydney II, HMAS Perth and HMAS Canberra. The original tree planted for the HMAS Canberra died in 2004 and has been replaced. There is also a memorial honouring the memory of those who served on the four HMAS Sydney ships. This monument consists of four circular bronze plaques set within a square consisting of pink and white granite divided by a cruciform axially aligned with the memorial mast. The cruciform is created by four raised long pink granite name plates, one each for the four Sydney ships. Nearby is a stone column from the old Sydney Post Office which is a distance of precisely one nautical mile from the tower of Fort Denison. To the north is the 1905 offshore electric beacon and foghorn originally powered by a submarine cable from the Fort Macquarie electric light station.

The mast consists of riveted mild steel tripod structure approximately 17m high supporting a sheltered gun direction platform and raised observation post, with a 1993 topmast above, including a yardarm from which block halyards are rigged. Steps and a viewing platform have been built at the mast base. The viewing platform is constructed from a bulb bar fastened with riveted brackets recycled from scrap (as evidenced by holes and irrelevant fastenings on the material). The deck of the viewing platform is constructed of welded mild steel plate. It is accessed by two steel ladders, which are of a Naval pattern but are truncated showing evidence of once being capable of being stowed. The mast's incorporation within the superstructure of the ship is evidenced by the remains of deep brackets riveted to the lower part of the tripod legs. The uneven surface where the brackets were riveted is now prone to corrosion.

Metal plaques attached to two legs of the mast read:

1. "Mast of the HMAS Sydney dedicated to the memory of the Petty Officers and men who were killed in the action against SMS Emden at Keeling Island near Cocos Island on November 9, 1914. Petty Officer P Lynch. Able Seaman R Sharp. Able Seaman A Hoy. Ordinary Seaman R Bell."
2. "Dedicated on November 24, 1934 - Municipality of Mosman - Ashton Park Trust - D. Carroll, Mayor - Col. Alfred Spain V.D. Chairman."

=== Condition ===
As at 17 May 2010, generally the HMAS Sydney 1 Memorial Mast is in good condition due to regular maintenance works. The mast's incorporation within the superstructure of the ship is evidenced by the remains of deep brackets riveted to the lower part of the tripod legs. The uneven surface where the brackets used to rivet the mast to the ship are now prone to corrosion.

Generally the fort is in good condition and has undergone conservation works to ensure preservation of much of the fabric. Poor drainage around the historic 1840 fortification, on which the mast rests, has resulted in corrosion in one of the support legs of the mast. This will be subject to further investigation to determine possible solutions.

Some elements have been replaced such as the metal deck plating. However the mast and memorial continue to retain a high degree of integrity and intactness

=== Modifications and dates ===
- 1871+ – Battery; the entire complex appears to have been unmodified except by minor additions such as the two traversing platforms. The HMAS Sydney 1 Mast has undergone several major maintenance upgrades since it was installed at Bradleys Head. Major maintenance works occurred in 1964, 1993 and 2000:
- 29 May 1964 – Mast removed for repairs at Cockatoo Island and re-erected six weeks later. It is during this period that it is believed that replating of the deck of the viewing platform with welded mild steel plate took place.
- 1993 – Mast repaired, with new topmast and yard arm fitted and mast completely repainted in-situ.
- 1996 – HMAS Sydney Memorial constructed in front of the mast.
- 2000 – Electricity upgraded and lighting installed, including upgrading the main line from Bradleys Head Road using overhead cable to existing poles supplying the navigation beacon. Underground cable was installed from the southern side of the car park to the mast. Cabling inside the mast frame connects to four lights (two up and down) to illuminate the structure. Sandblasting and complete repainting of the mast in navy grey, including repainting of the lower platform with epoxy non skid paint to reduce slip hazard. Metal work including removal, repair and reinstatement of corroded stairs leading to the raised observation platform and installation of new handrails. Some extraneous metal strips, old protruding screws and corroded angle brackets were removed from the mast structure to prevent further corrosion damage and allow painting. Mast sandblasted and completely repainted in situ.
- 4 August 2004 – Admiral Rowen Moffitt AM, RAN replanted the nearby HMAS Canberra brush box tree as part of a memorial service, after the previous tree died and was removed.

== Heritage listing ==
As at 5 July 2010, the HMAS Sydney I Memorial Mast has outstanding social significance and rarity value in a statewide and national context as a premier naval monument and the only naval monument in Australia to which ceremonial honours must be rendered by all passing naval ships. The status of the mast serves as a mark of respect for, and a reminder of, Australian officers, sailors and ships lost at sea and in combat, and the naval tradition to which all Australian and international naval personnel belong. Furthermore, the mast has state historical significance as a component of the World War I warship whose distinguished service and battle success served as a national and international demonstration of the fledgling Australian nation's capacity to govern itself both independently and successfully. Together with nearby monuments it creates a precinct of remembrance for a series of Australian naval ships named after Australian capital cities and lost at sea.

The nineteenth century forts are of exceptional significance as one of a series of military fortifications located around Sydney Harbour which demonstrate the evolution of government policies towards defending Sydney and its harbour.

Bradleys Head Forts was listed on the New South Wales State Heritage Register on 30 August 2010 having satisfied the following criteria.

The place is important in demonstrating the course, or pattern, of cultural or natural history in New South Wales.

The 1840 fort and later additions have state historical significance as one of a series of planned forts resulting from fears about the vulnerability of the settlement following the undetected entry of two naval war ships into Sydney Harbour in 1839. It is one of a series of batteries established to defend the settlement, reflecting changes in government policy towards the defence of Sydney in response to political conditions and perceived war time threats from 1788 to the close of World War II.

The mast also has State historical significance as an element of HMAS Sydney I, a RAN warship which fought and served with distinction during World War I. Although not on board when the internationally significant battle with SMS Emden took place, the mast had already been installed when HMAS Sydney was present at the surrender of the German High Seas fleet in 1918. HMAS Sydney and its significant components, such as the mast, have additional importance as a warship of the first RAN fleet named after the City of Sydney, and which inspired a series of well known local trademarks.

The place has a strong or special association with a person, or group of persons, of importance of cultural or natural history of New South Wales's history.

The mast has associations at a State level with individual naval commanders and crew who have served aboard HMAS Sydney 1. Its location on the 1840 fortifications provide a link between modern naval traditions and the colonial military past.

The 1840 fort has associations with Captain George Barney of the Royal Engineers who conceived the idea of the battery as part of a plan to improve Sydney's military defences.

The place is important in demonstrating aesthetic characteristics and/or a high degree of creative or technical achievement in New South Wales.

Sited at Bradleys Head the mast and fort have local aesthetic significance as part of the landscape of the Sydney Harbour northern shoreline that is easily visible from many areas of the southern section of the harbour, including Vaucluse, South Head, Rose Bay, Point Piper, Garden Island, harbour islands such as Clark Island and Shark Island, the Sydney Opera House, the Harbour Bridge and Milsons Point. The mast and fort have featured in a number of contemporary images and artwork of the harbour as wall as signifying the end of the western channel. The ceremonial piping of the mast as naval ships pass with the upper deck crews at attention creates a visually poignant sight both from boats on the harbour those areas on shore where the ship's entry and Bradleys Head are visible.

The 1840 fort has state historical significance as one of the earliest of a series of forts around Sydney Harbour. The forts generally contribute to both the functional and visual relationships between the various forts located on headlands within Sydney Harbour.

The place has a strong or special association with a particular community or cultural group in New South Wales for social, cultural or spiritual reasons.

The mast has outstanding State and National social significance as a major site for the remembrance of HMAS Sydney I and her crew, who became a symbol of national pride and strength in the era she sailed. This is reflected in the use of images of HMAS Sydney as a trademark on domestic items.

The dedication of the memorial in 1964 to the nineteen RAN ships lost in service and the subsequent introduction of the requirement for all naval ships to render ceremonial honours to the mast on entering Sydney Harbour has elevated the site to a level of exceptional significance. For Australian naval personnel, the mast is the premier reminder of the naval tradition in which they serve and of those who have served with them and before them. Of more moderate significance is the mast's role as a reminder to all foreign naval personnel entering the harbour aboard naval ships of the worldwide brotherhood of naval tradition.

The memorial is sited with a precinct which now contains memorials to other naval ships lost at sea, including a number based in Sydney, creating a precinct of memorials that provides a central focus for commemoration of individuals and these ships.

The place has potential to yield information that will contribute to an understanding of the cultural or natural history of New South Wales.

The mast is a good example of WWI naval architecture and shipbuilding construction and practice. It is finely made with high quality mild steel and demonstrates superb riveting techniques. As a tripod the mast demonstrates the initial change in form and material from timber to steel, ending a tradition going back to the first naval vessels of the Tudor period. The steel tripod was the first self-supporting mast dispensing with the need for expensive and labour-intensive conventional rigging.

The forts at Bradley's Head, together with remnants of others located around Sydney Harbour, demonstrate local technical changes and advances in fort building in response to changing defence requirements until World War II. In particular, the earliest fort provides physical evidence of inner harbour defence together with Kirribilli Point, Mrs Macquarie's Point, Fort Macquarie and Dawes Point.

The place possesses uncommon, rare or endangered aspects of the cultural or natural history of New South Wales.

The HMAS Sydney 1 Memorial Mast is rare in NSW as the only monument in Australia to which all Australian and foreign naval vessels must render ceremonial honours when entering Sydney Harbour. This honour is equivalent to that accorded to HMS Victory, the world's oldest commissioned ship located in Portsmouth, England. It is also part of a rare group of monuments in Australia considered to be premier naval monuments.

The 1840s fort is the only completed fort out of three proposed for construction in 1839 in response to increased concerns about the colony vulnerability in the event of an attack.

The place is important in demonstrating the principal characteristics of a class of cultural or natural places/environments in New South Wales.

The monument is state significant as being representative of a series of monuments across Australia associated with HMAS Sydney I and its successors designed to commemorate either HMAS Sydney I specifically, or the group of HMAS Sydney naval ships and their crews. It is also representative of a series of relics specifically associated with HMAS Sydney I, including a section of the bow at Kirribilli, and monuments commemorating the Royal Australian Navy and its personnel generally.

The Bradleys Head forts are representative of a series of visible structures developed and modified around Sydney Harbour from the 1790s until the end of World War II. The fort and others around the harbour represent a system of coastal defence in NSW made obsolete from World War II due to the development of jet aircraft and guided missiles.

== Gallery ==
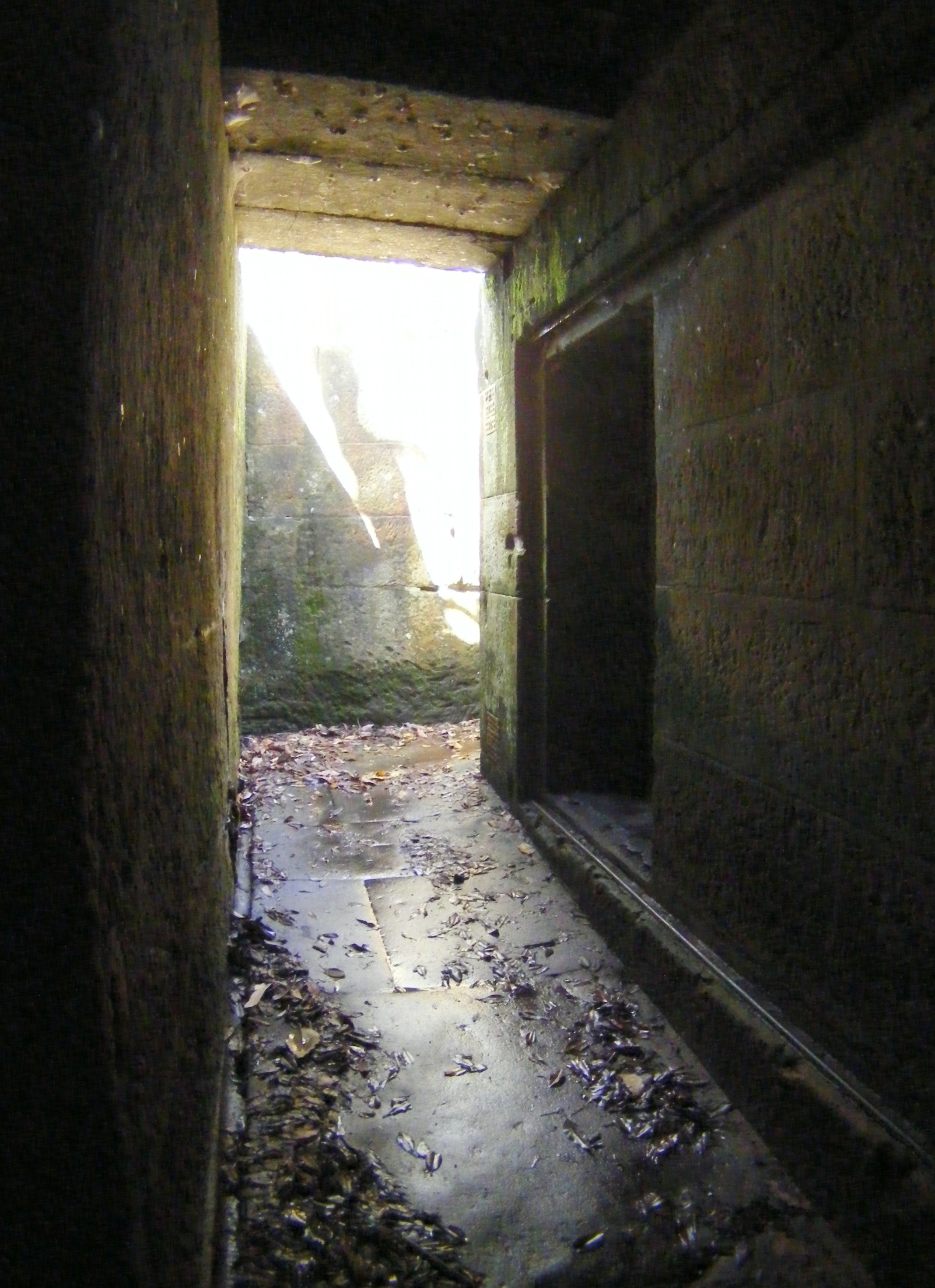
The only entrance to the battery constructed in 1871

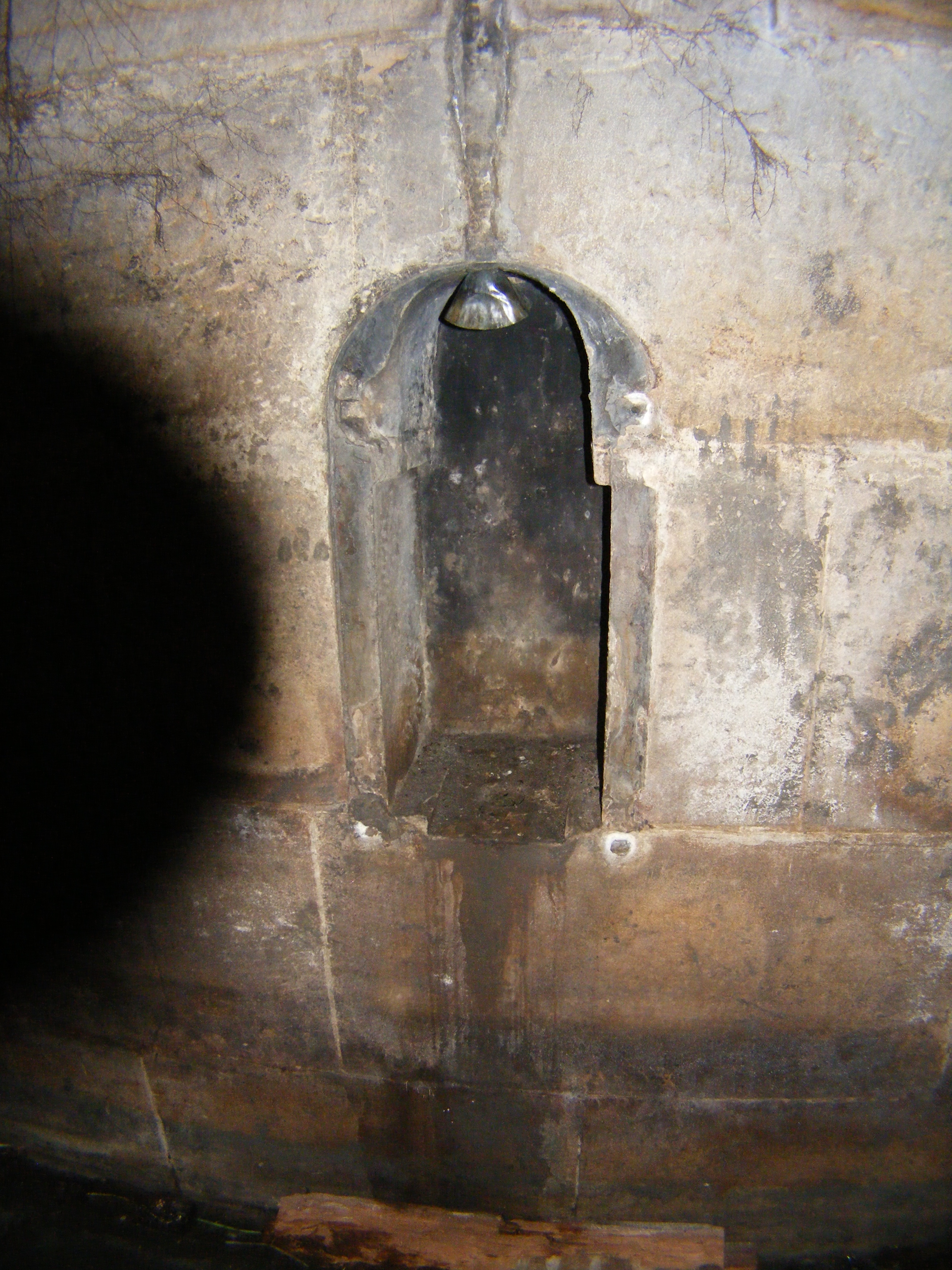
A feature inside the onsite barracks

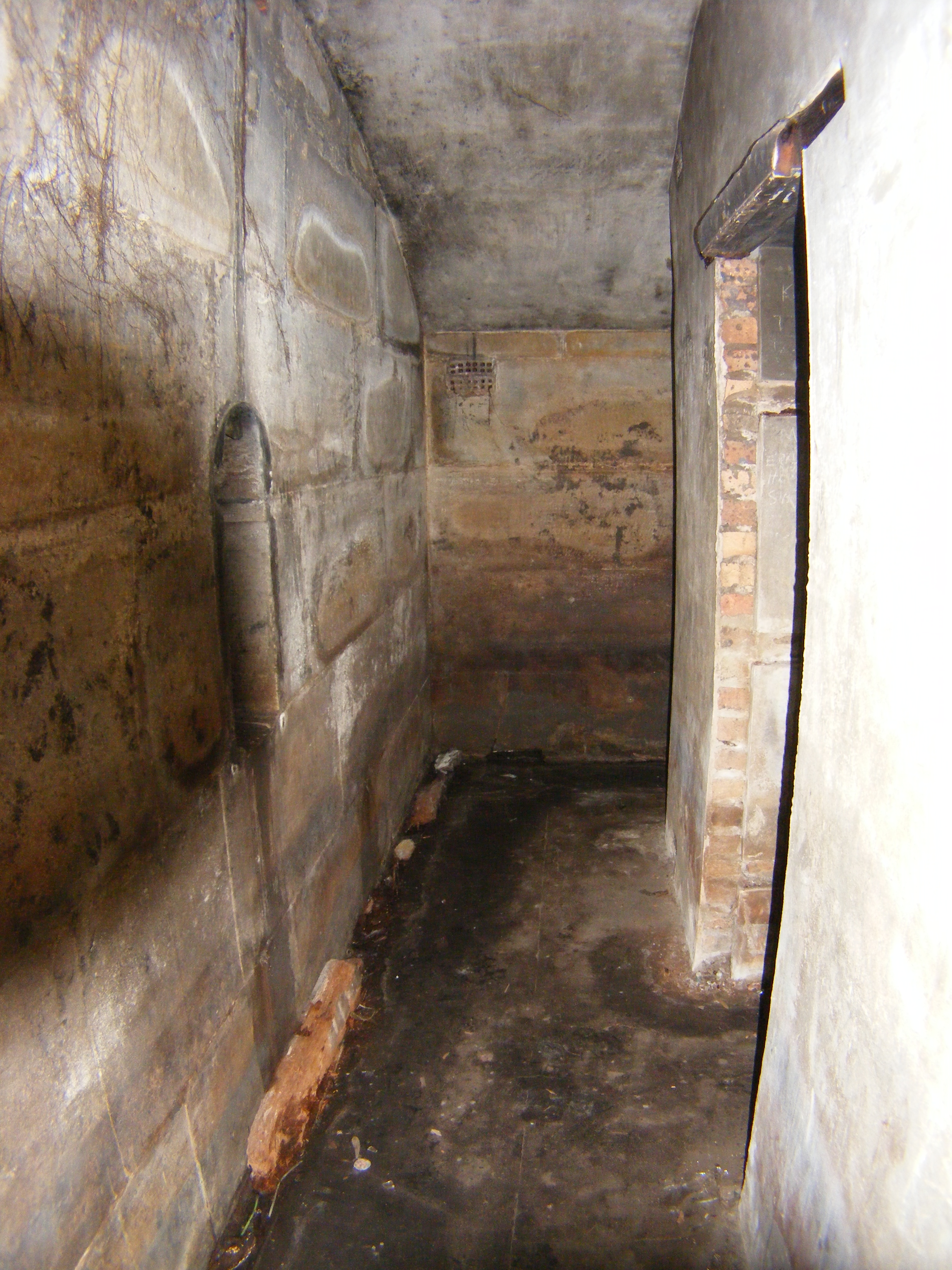
One of the barrack hallways with an entry point to the innermost chamber on the right hand side

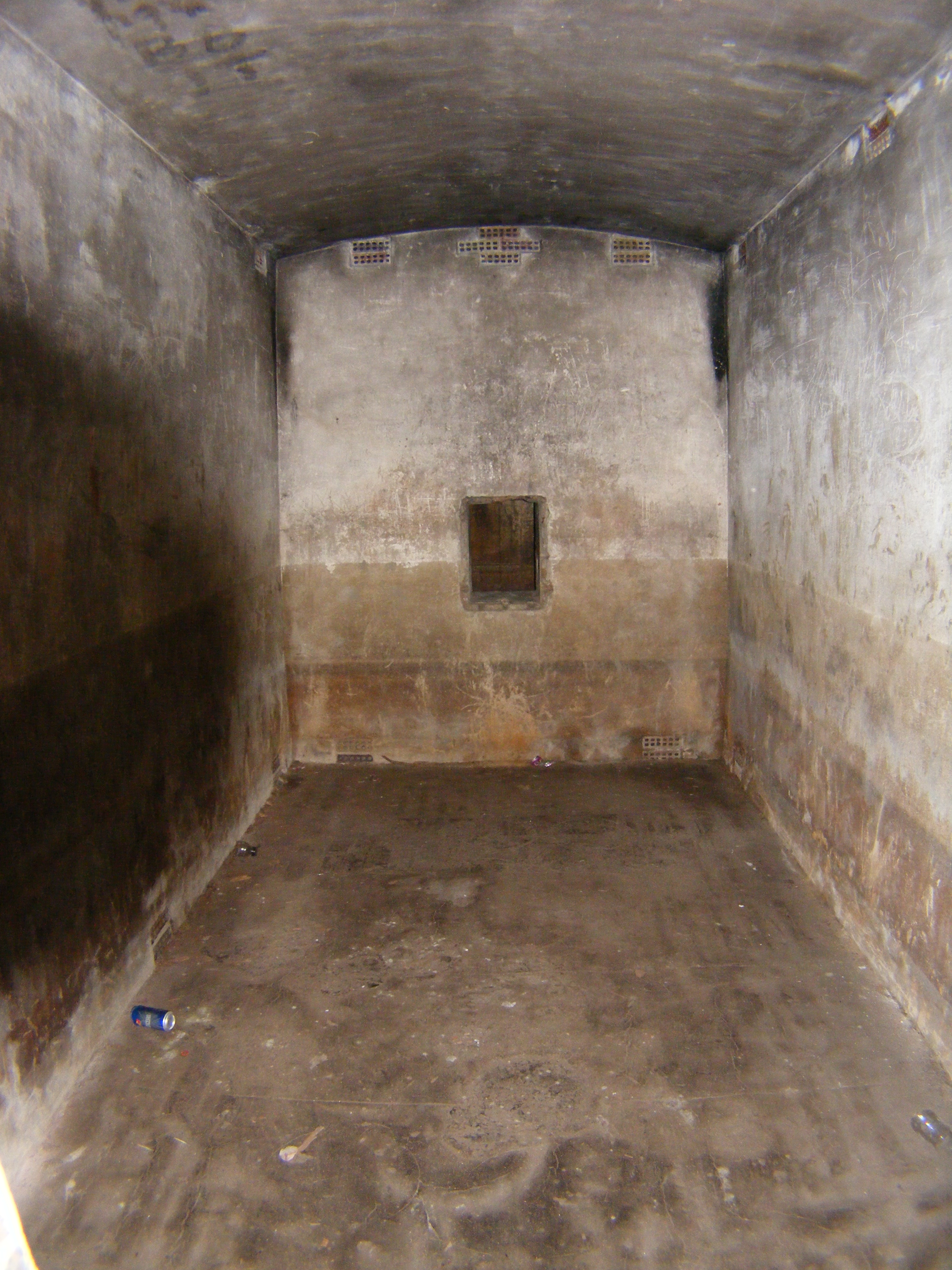
The innermost chamber of the barracks

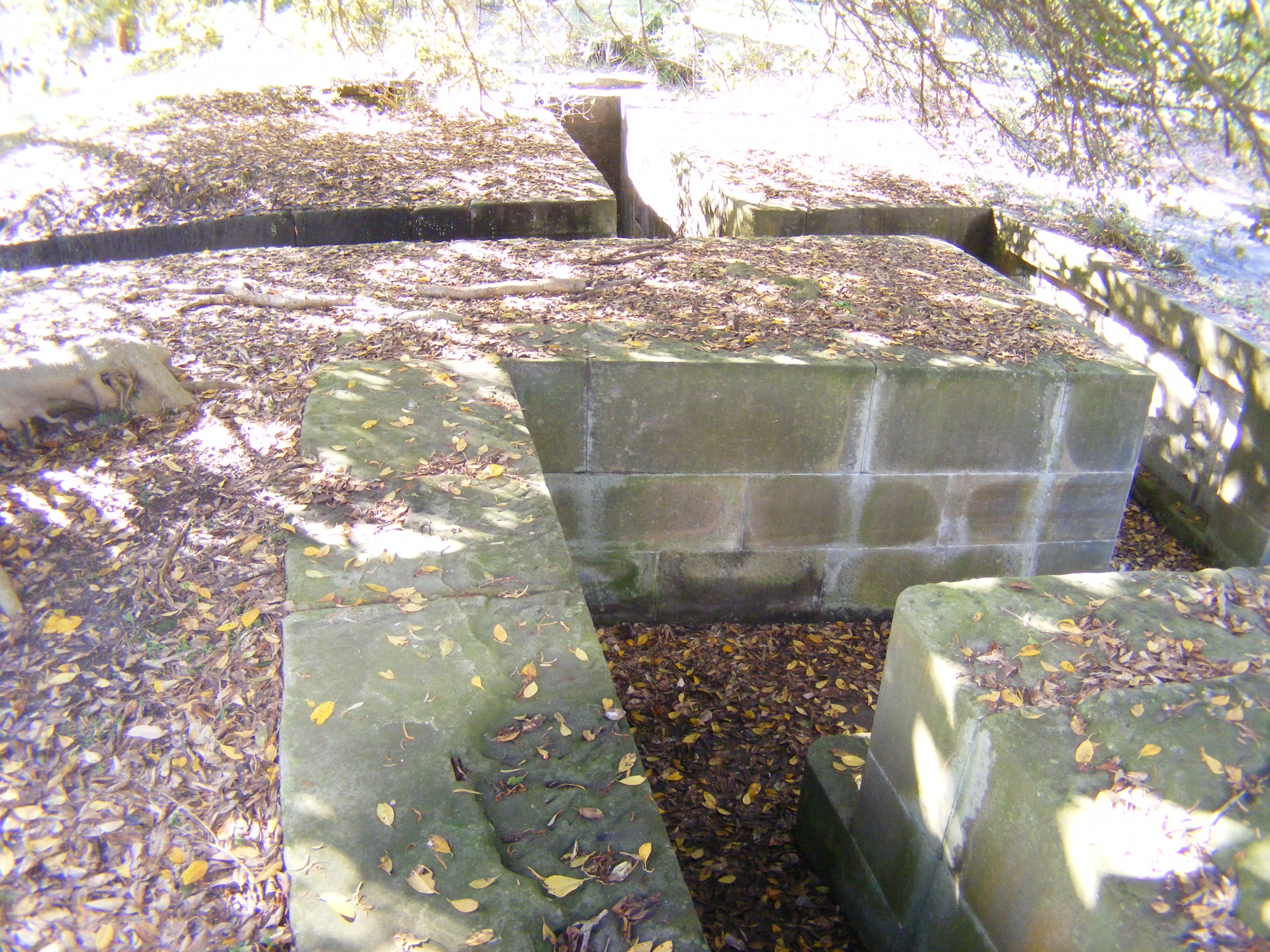
Trenches leading to gun emplacements and into the underground chambers on site

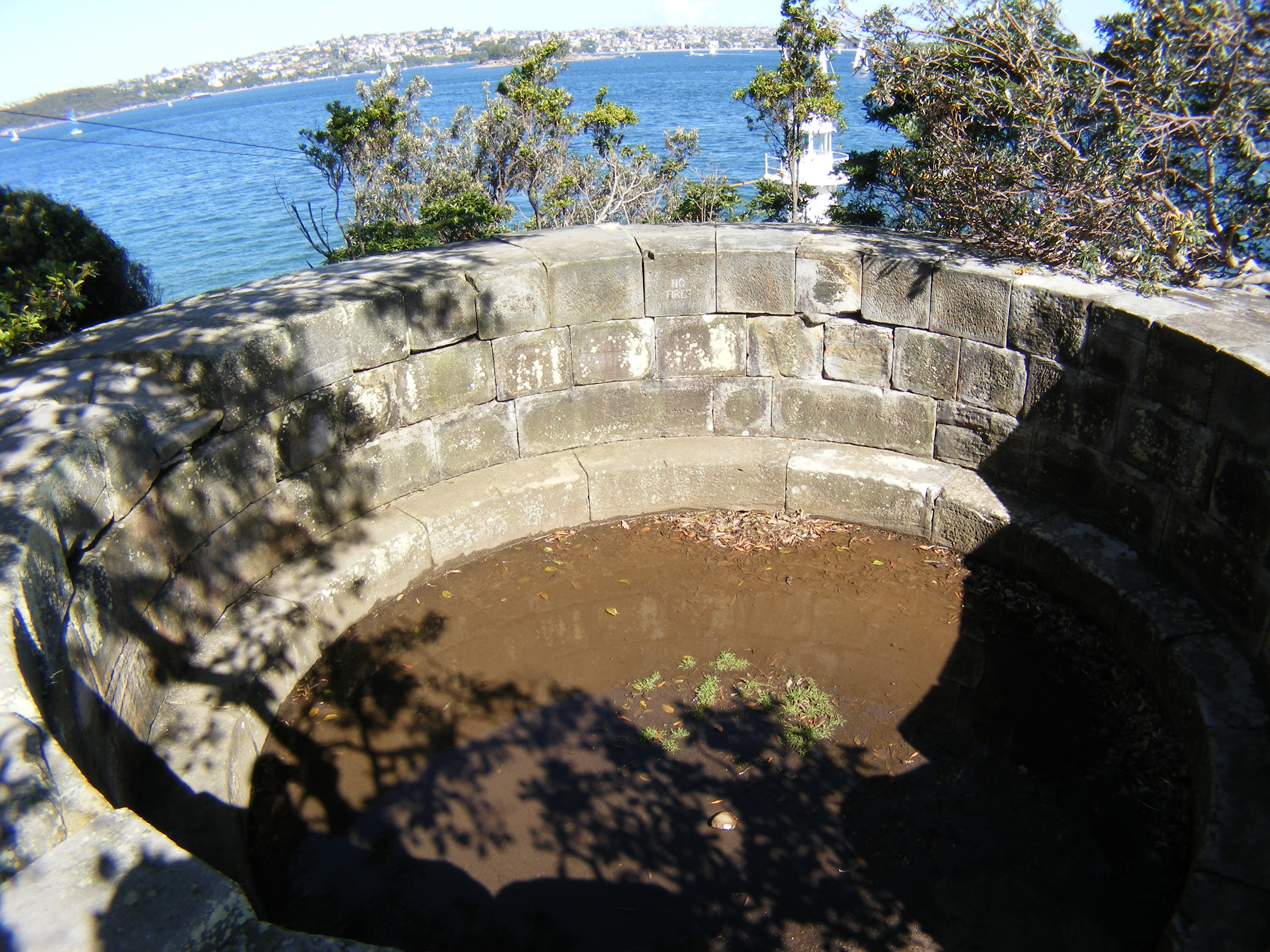
Large gun emplacement constructed 1840-42

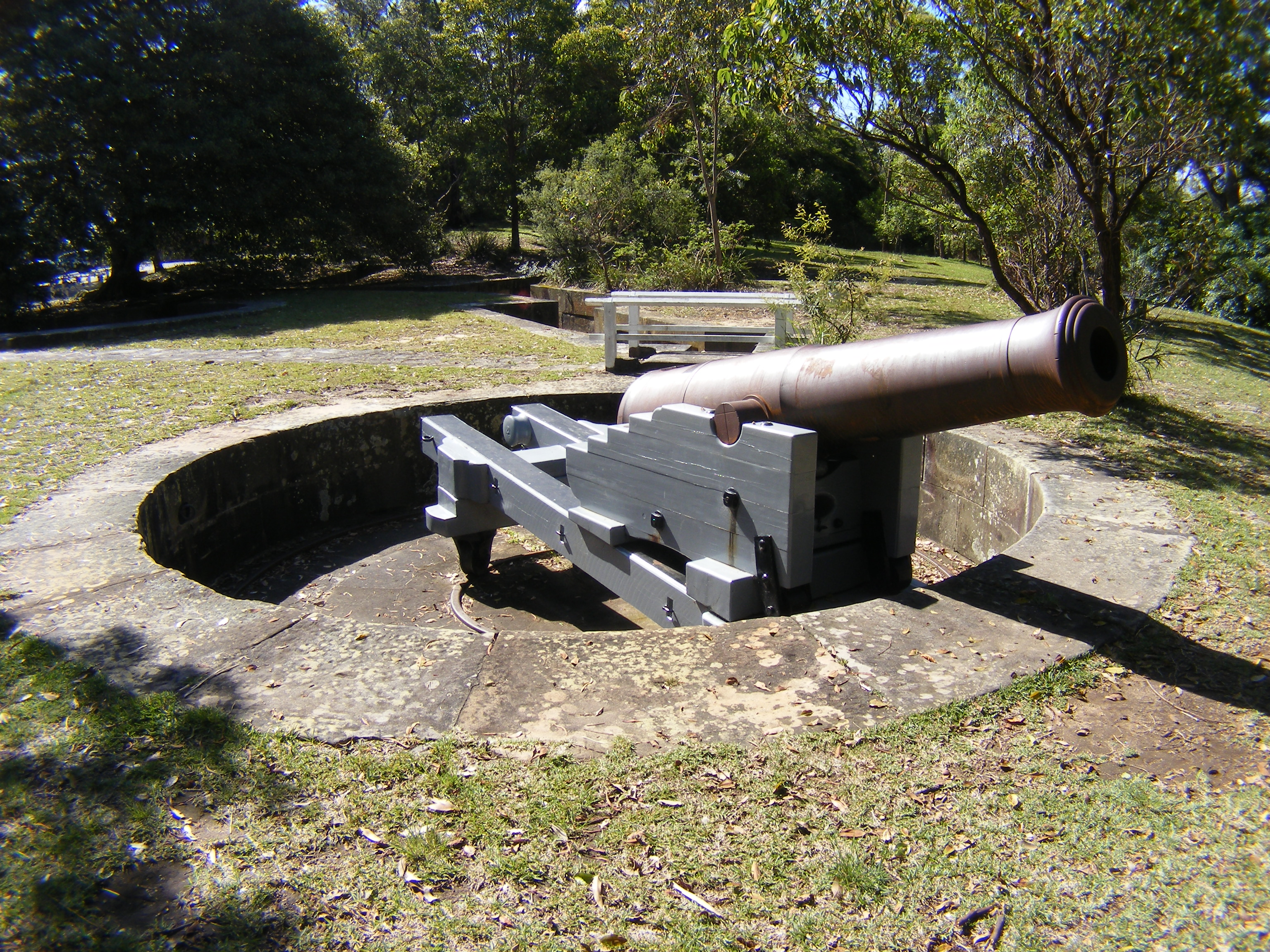
SBML 68-pounder gun and emplacement constructed 1871

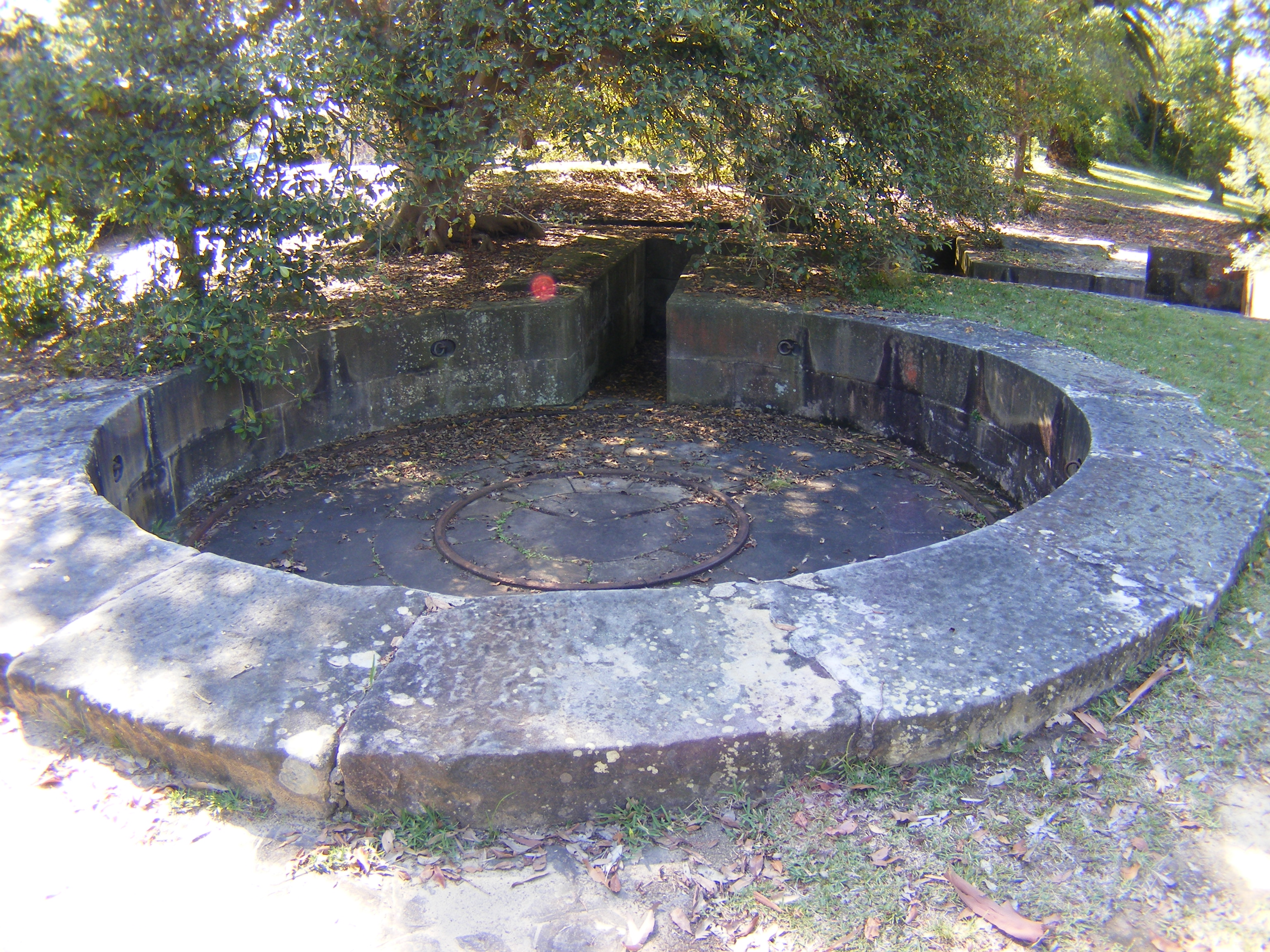
Empty gun emplacement constructed 1871

== See also ==
- List of Forts in Australia
- Bradleys Head
- Georges Head Battery
- Middle Head Fortifications
- Military history of Australia
