= Middle Head Fortifications =

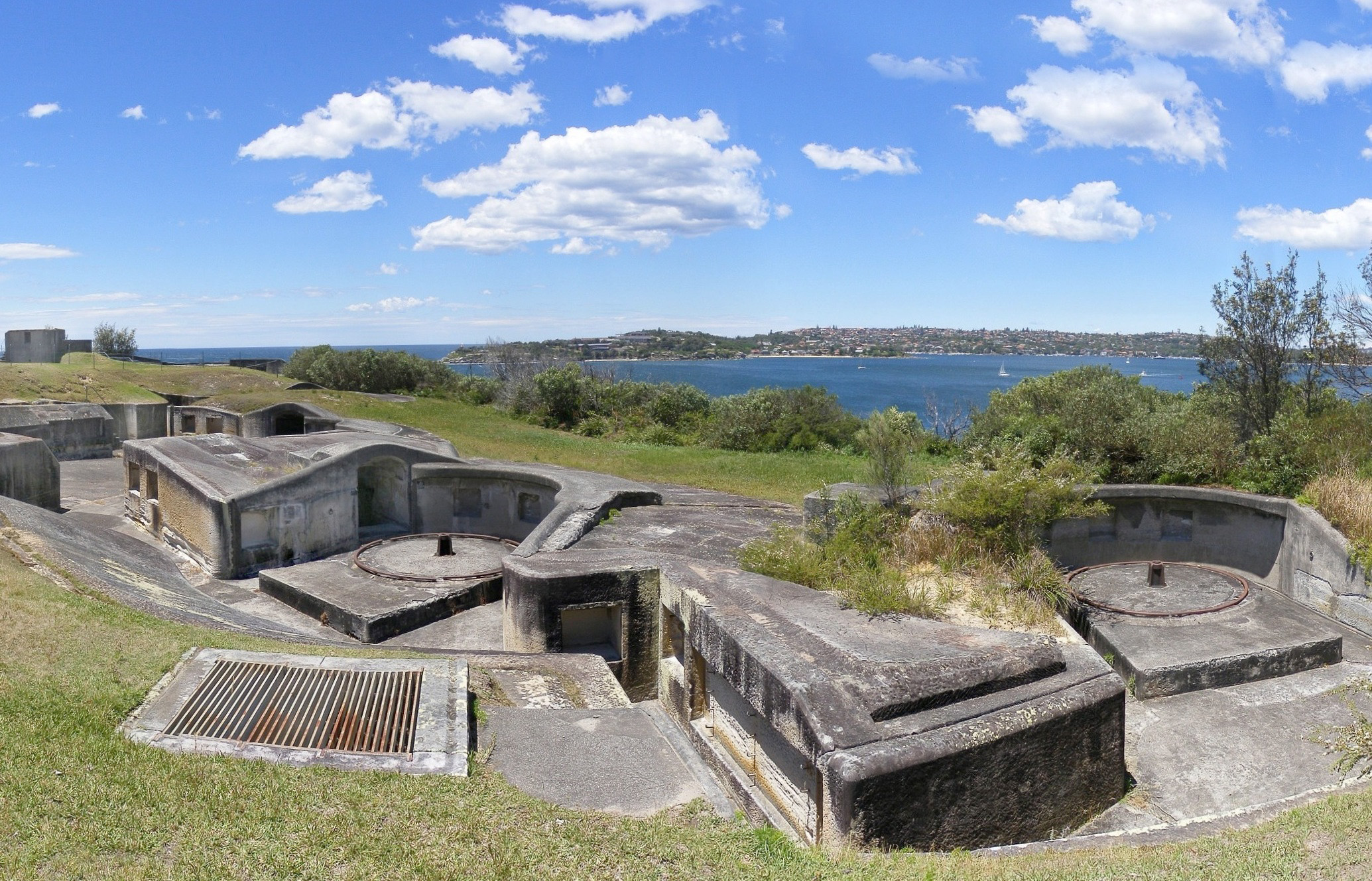
- Gun emplacements

- Location within inner Sydney
- 33°49′38″S 151°16′05″E
- Location: Middle Head Road, Middle Head, Mosman, Mosman Council, New South Wales, Australia

History
- Built: 1801–1942

Site notes
- Architect: James Barnet
- Owner: NSW Office of Environment and Heritage

Commonwealth Heritage List
- Official name: Chowder Bay Barracks Group, Chowder Bay Rd, Georges Heights, NSW, Australia
- Type: Listed place
- Designated: 22 June 2004
- Reference no.: 105254
- Class: Historic
- Place File No: 1/13/026/0008

New South Wales Heritage Register
- Official name: Middle Head Military Fortifications; Middle Head Fortifications; The Old Fort
- Type: State heritage (complex / group)
- Designated: 2 April 1999
- Reference no.: 999
- Type: Fortification
- Category: Defence

The Middle Head Fortifications is a heritage-listed former defence establishment and military fortifications and now public space located at Middle Head Road, Middle Head, Mosman in the Mosman Council local government area of New South Wales, Australia. It is also known as the Middle Head Military Fortifications or The Old Fort. The fortifications consist of the Outer Middle Head Battery located at the end of Old Fort Road, the Inner Middle Head Battery located at the end of Governors Road, and the Obelisk batteries reached by a path from the corner of Middle Head Road and Chowder Bay Road. The fortifications at Middle Head formed part of Sydney Harbour's defences. The property is owned by the Department of Planning and Environment. It was added to the New South Wales State Heritage Register on 2 April 1999.

== History ==
The first fort at Middle Head was built in 1801 and the last batteries were constructed in 1942. The majority of the fortifications were built between 1870 and 1911. The site contains the works of several periods and technologies, which remain in place for review today. Historically it dates from the time when defence was first moved away from Sydney Cove and towards The Heads.

There were three sets of fortifications built in Mosman and Middle Head in the 1870s, these were upgraded in the 1880s on the advice of British experts. These fortifications still exist and are now heritage listed, they are, the Lower Georges Heights Commanding Position, the Georges Head Battery and a smaller fort located on Bradleys Head, known as the Bradleys Head Fortification Complex.

The battery on Middle Head built in 1871 was designed by James Barnet, a colonial architect. The fort was built on a strategic location and received many additions until 1911. It formed part of a network of 'outer harbour' defences. They were designed to fire at enemy ships as they attempted entry through the Sydney Heads. The whole area is linked by an extensive network of tunnels, ancillary rooms, gunpowder magazine and a disappearing gun emplacement. The site has its own underground power room that is supported by iron columns. Rooms located below ground were used to train some of Australia's first troops who were sent to Vietnam in 'Code of Conduct' courses, which were lessons in how to withstand torture and interrogation, by simulating prisoner of war conditions.

In 1974, the Middle Head fortifications featured in the movie Stone.

In 1979, most of the area became national park and the military has moved on to more strategic locations. The army base on site which included the transport group and 30 Terminal Squadron, left Georges Height's in 1997. The Headquarters Training Command section relocated to the Victoria Barracks in 2002.

== The Officers Quarters ==
The Officers quarters is a Victorian Regency style building that was built on a rough stone base. It was designed by Colonial Architect James Barnet and is considered to be one of the most significant buildings at Middle Head. The site incorporates a defensive ditch or moat and includes a fortification wall. The house looking in the direction of Middle Harbour meant that it could be used for surveillance purposes as well.

One former resident was Major General Sir William Throsby Bridges KCB, CMG, the first commander of the First Australian Imperial Force and the commander of Australian forces in the Gallipoli Campaign. Throsby Bridges was killed by a sniper whilst leading the forces at Gallipoli. His warhorse Sandy was brought back to Australia, seeing out its days in Victoria.

Primarily used as a residence this building originally housed two officers separately, a senior and junior officer. During World War II this building served as a Red Cross Hospital and later as accommodation for the Australian Women's Army Service. The house continues to be used as a residence.

== Restoration ==
Extensive restoration work has been conducted by the Sydney Harbour Federation Trust which has revived many of the old buildings.

The sites facilities include:

- Former military hospital buildings
- Former Officers' mess
- Former barracks converted to the School of Pacific Administration
- Former 10 Terminal Transport Depot, later the Army School of Intelligence
- 30 Terminal Transport Depot
- Former Submarine Miners' Depot, later Army Maritime School
- Wharf, jetty
- Training facilities
- Fortifications systems
- Depots, barracks, mess halls
- Residential accommodation
- Ovals

== Heritage listing ==
Middle Head Military Fortifications was listed on the New South Wales State Heritage Register on 2 April 1999 and in 2004 the Chowder Bay Barracks Group, including the Georges Head Battery, was inscribed on the Commonwealth Heritage List.

== Gallery ==
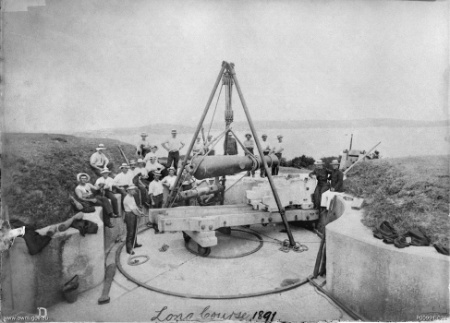
RML gun being removed in 1891

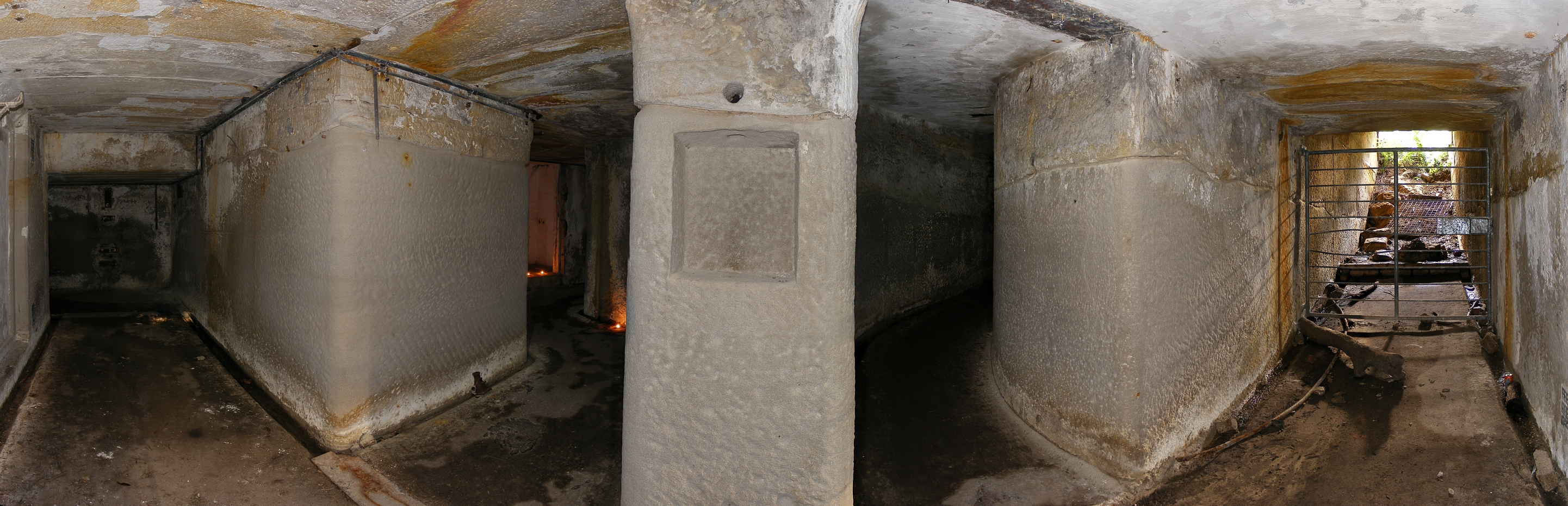
Inside the underground fortress tunnel network

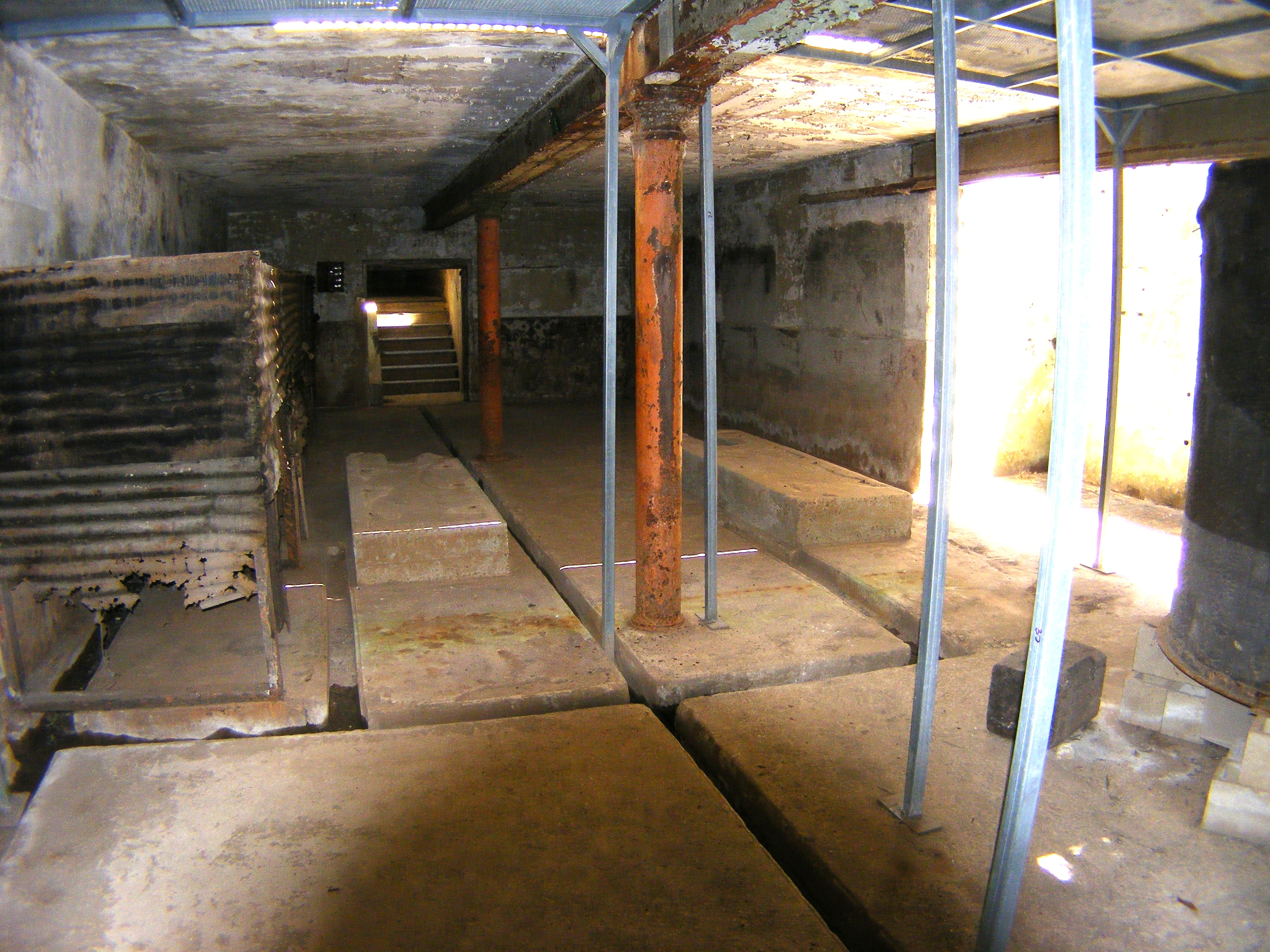

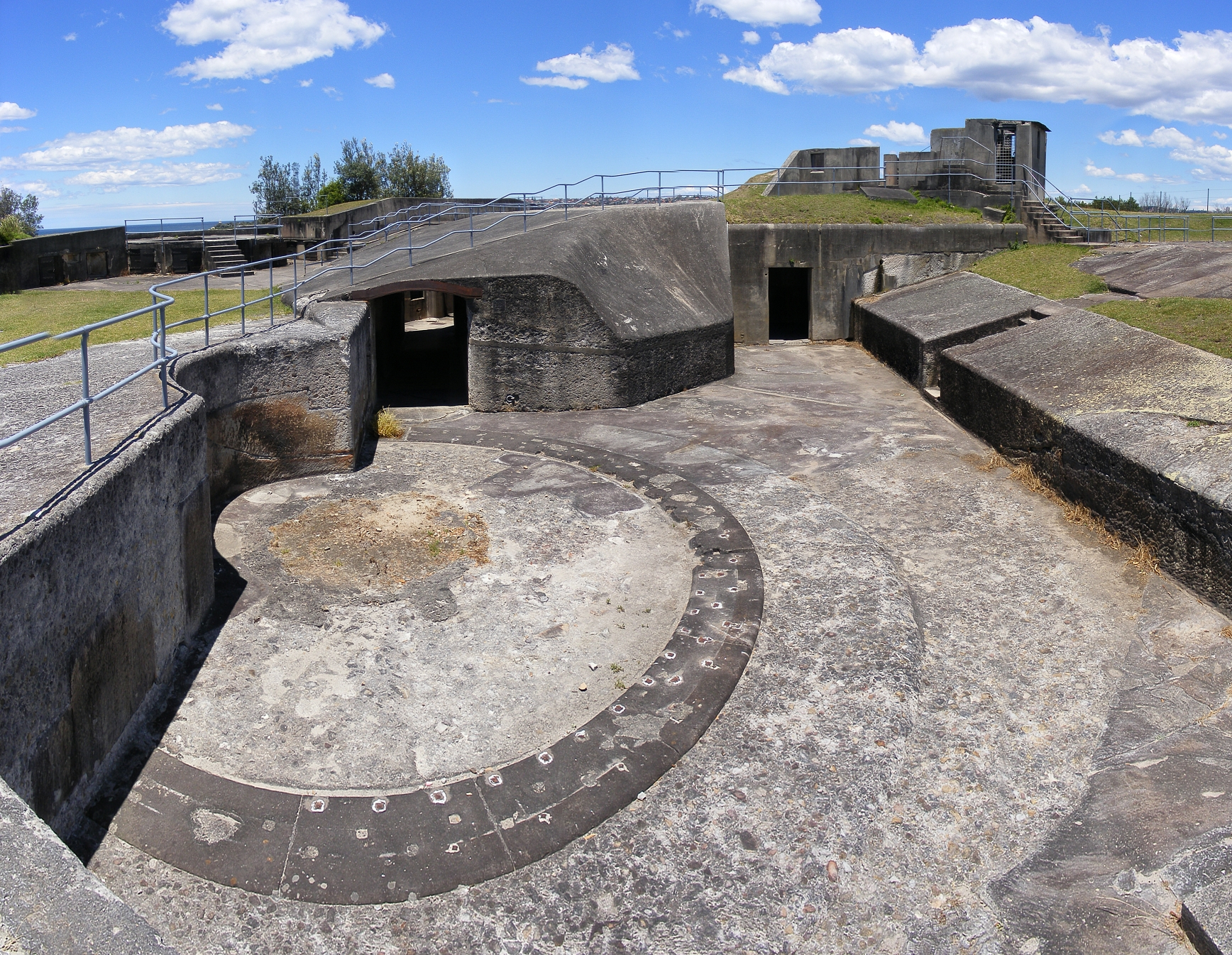
An underground power room supported by iron columns that was used to train some of Australia's first troops that were sent to Vietnam in 'Code of Conduct' courses with tigers cages pictured on the left and gun emplacements

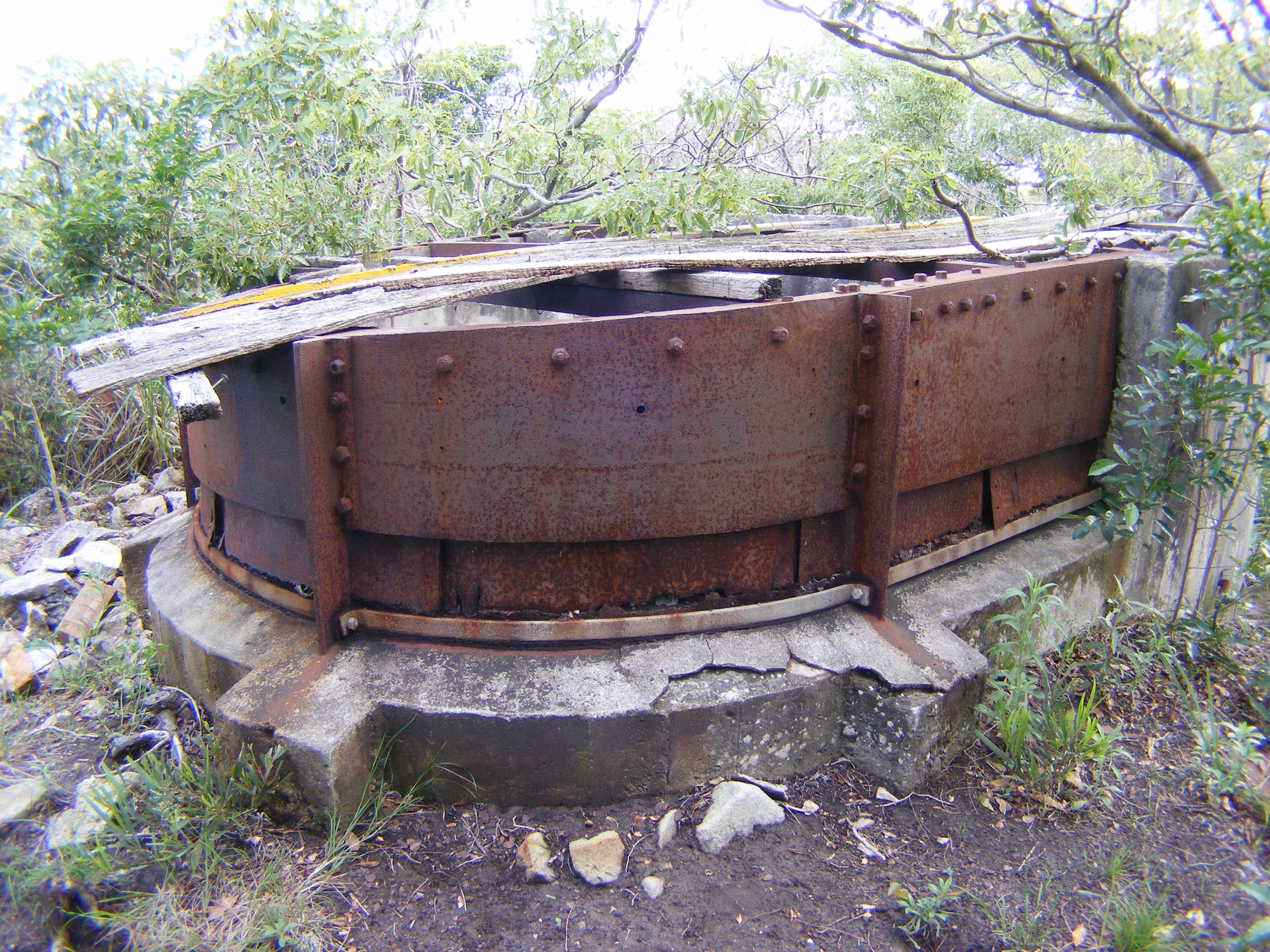

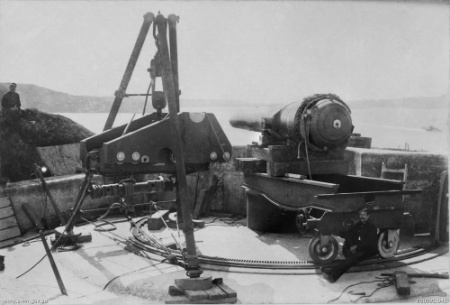
RML 10 inch gun being dismantled at the fortification in 1893 and the remains of a former depression range finding station

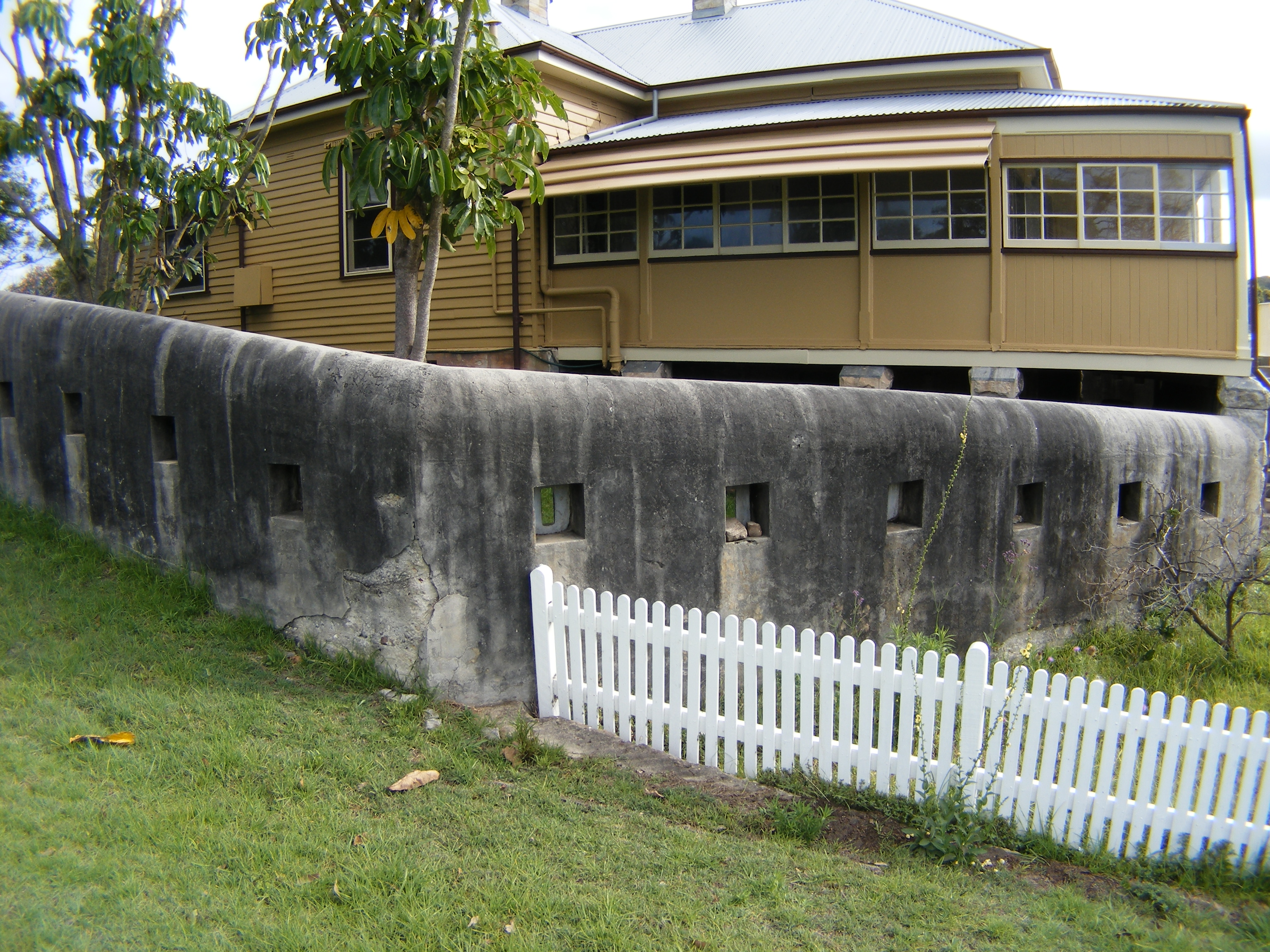
A side view of the officers quarters with fortified wall in view

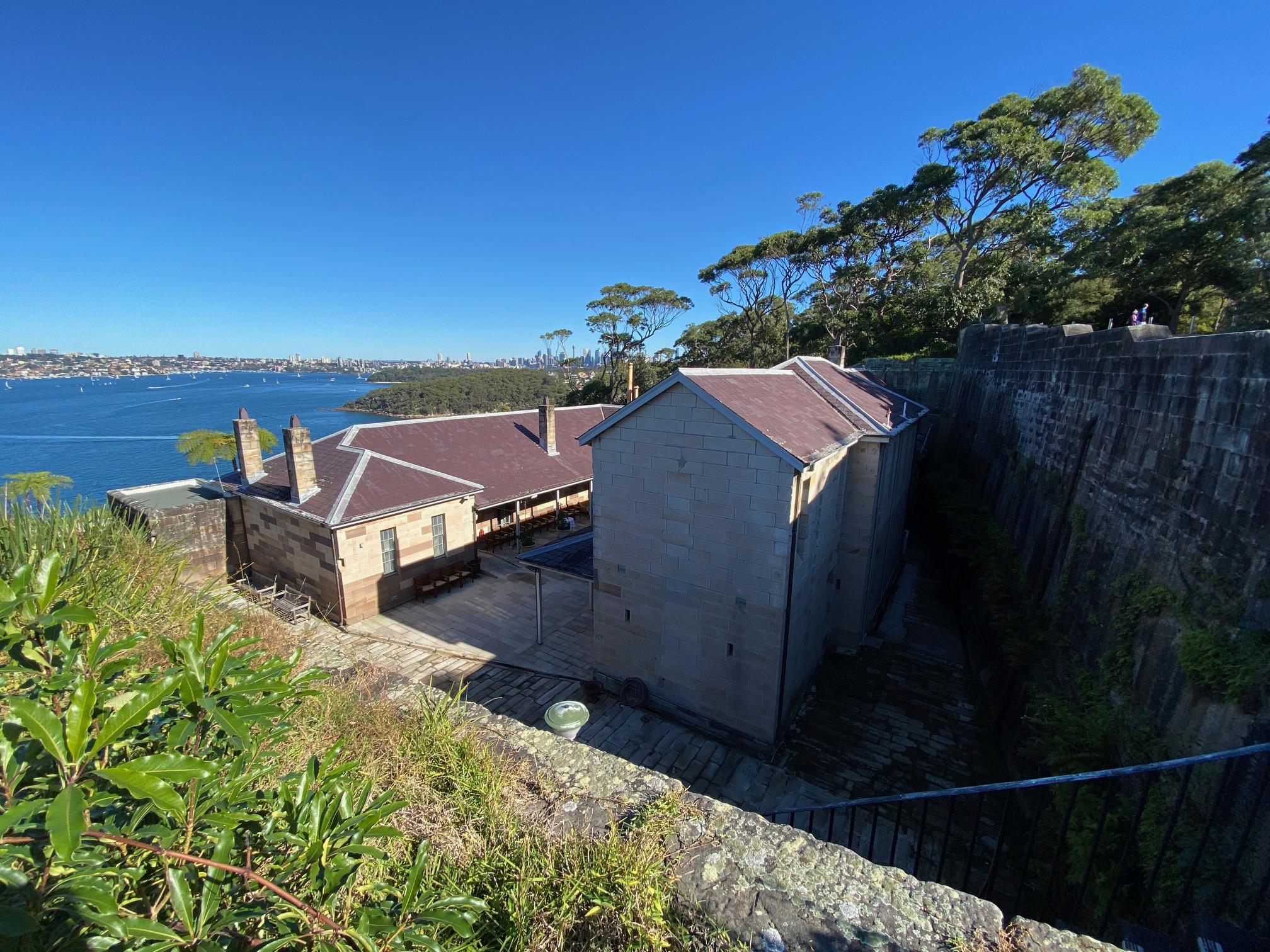
Gunners Barracks, Middle Head, Sydney

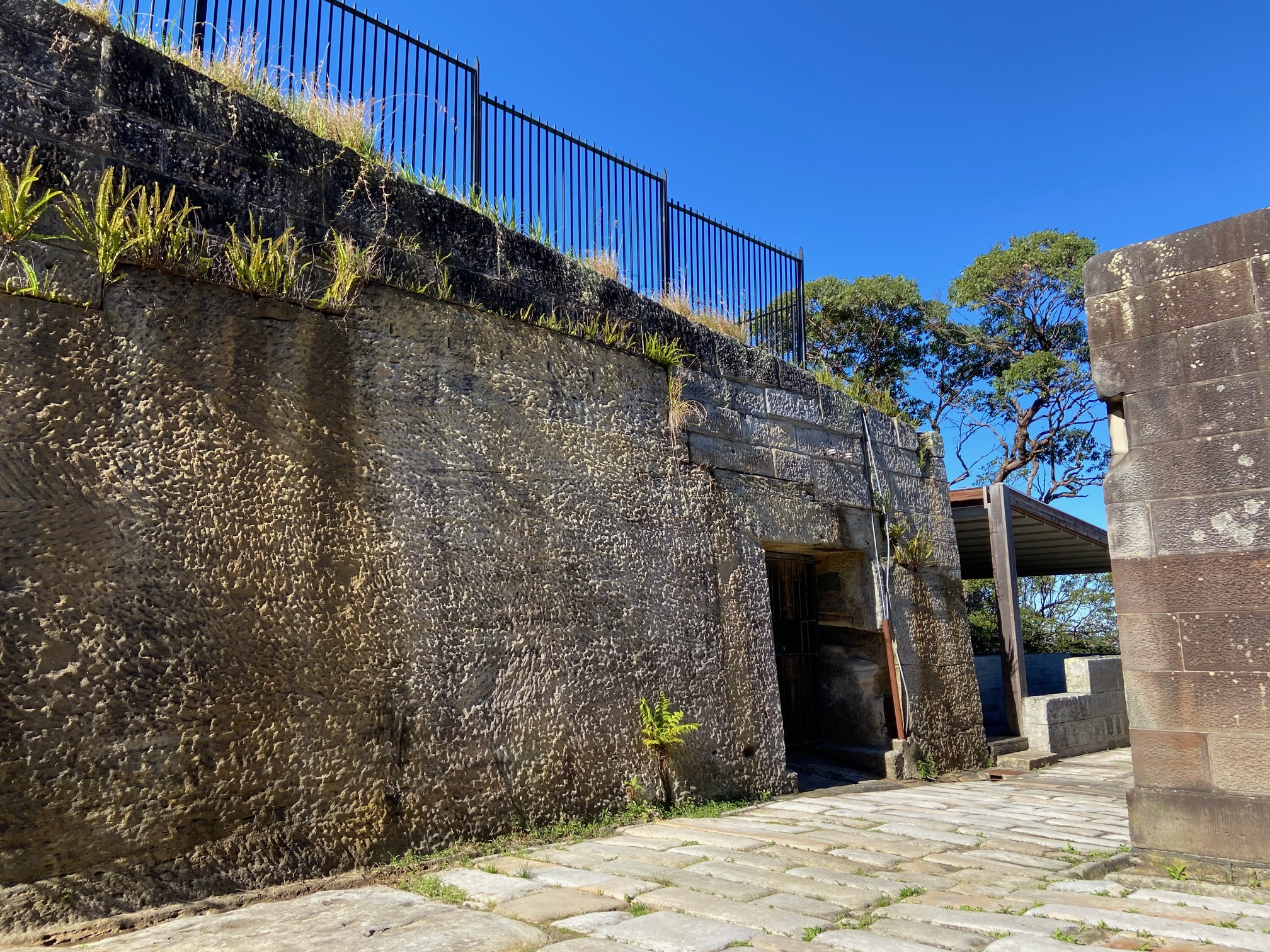
Gunners Barracks, tactically situated into the hillside so as not to be visible from the water. The barracks buildings were constructed from sandstone excavated onsite.

== See also ==
- Bradleys Head Fortification Complex
- Georges Head Battery
- Protected areas of New South Wales
- Military history of Australia
- Garden Island Tunnel System
