= Sydney Heads =

Headlands around Sydney Harbour

Sydney Heads North Head, South Head, Middle Head, and the Heads
- Headlands
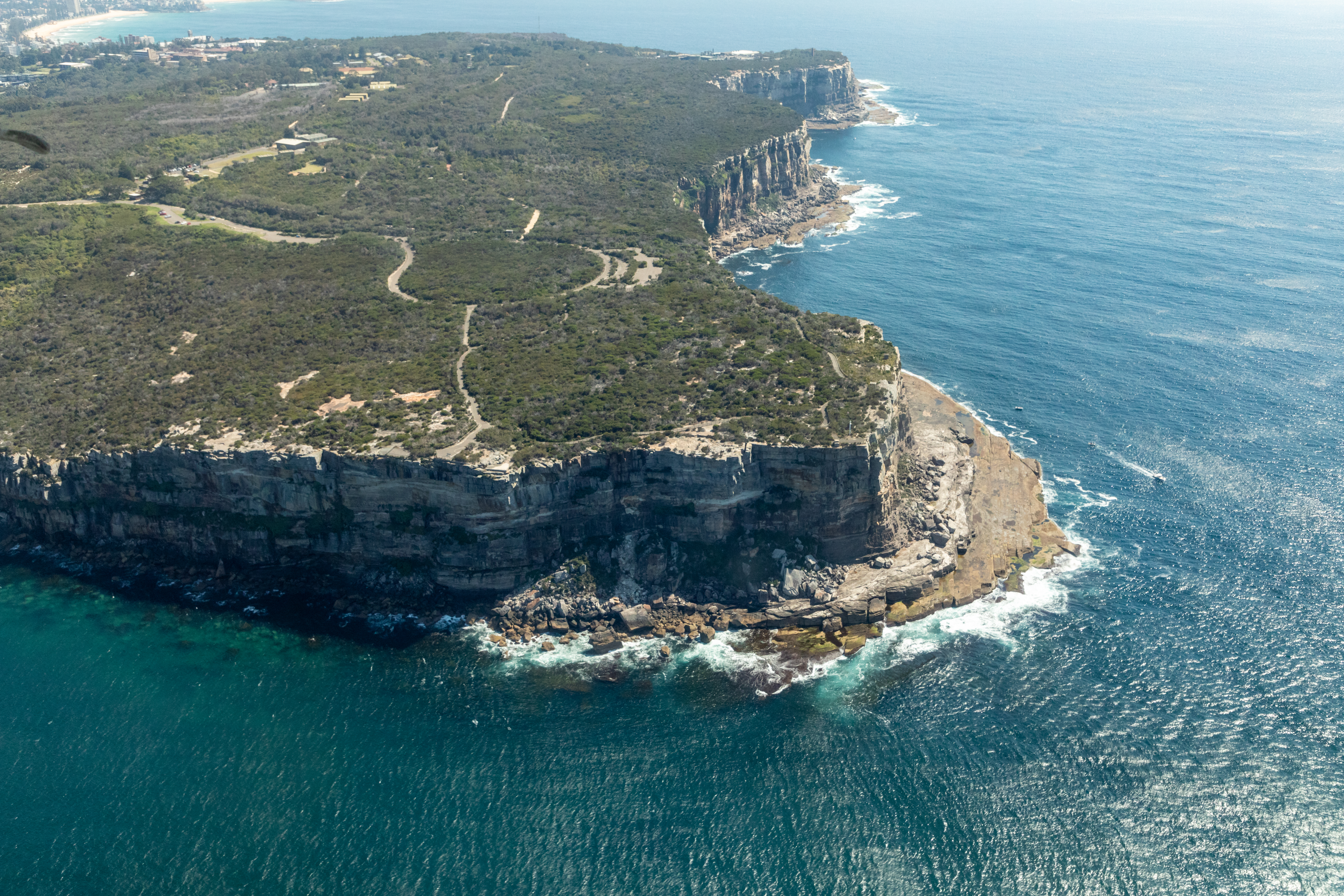
- North Head
- Interactive map of Sydney Heads
- Coordinates: 33°50′12″S 151°16′52″E
- Location: Port Jackson

The Sydney Heads (also simply known as the Heads) are a series of headlands that form the 2 km (1.2 mi) wide entrance to Sydney Harbour in Sydney, New South Wales, Australia. North Head and Quarantine Head are to the north; South Head and Dunbar Head are to the south; and Middle Head, Georges Head, and Chowder Head are to the west and within the harbour. The Heads are contained within the Sydney Harbour National Park.

Some features located on the heads are heritage-listed on the Australian National Heritage List; such as the Hornby Lighthouse, located on South Head, Australia's third-oldest lighthouse; Macquarie Lighthouse, Australia's first lighthouse, located 3 kilometres (1.9 mi) to the south on Dunbar Head; and the former Quarantine Station on North Head.

== North Head ==
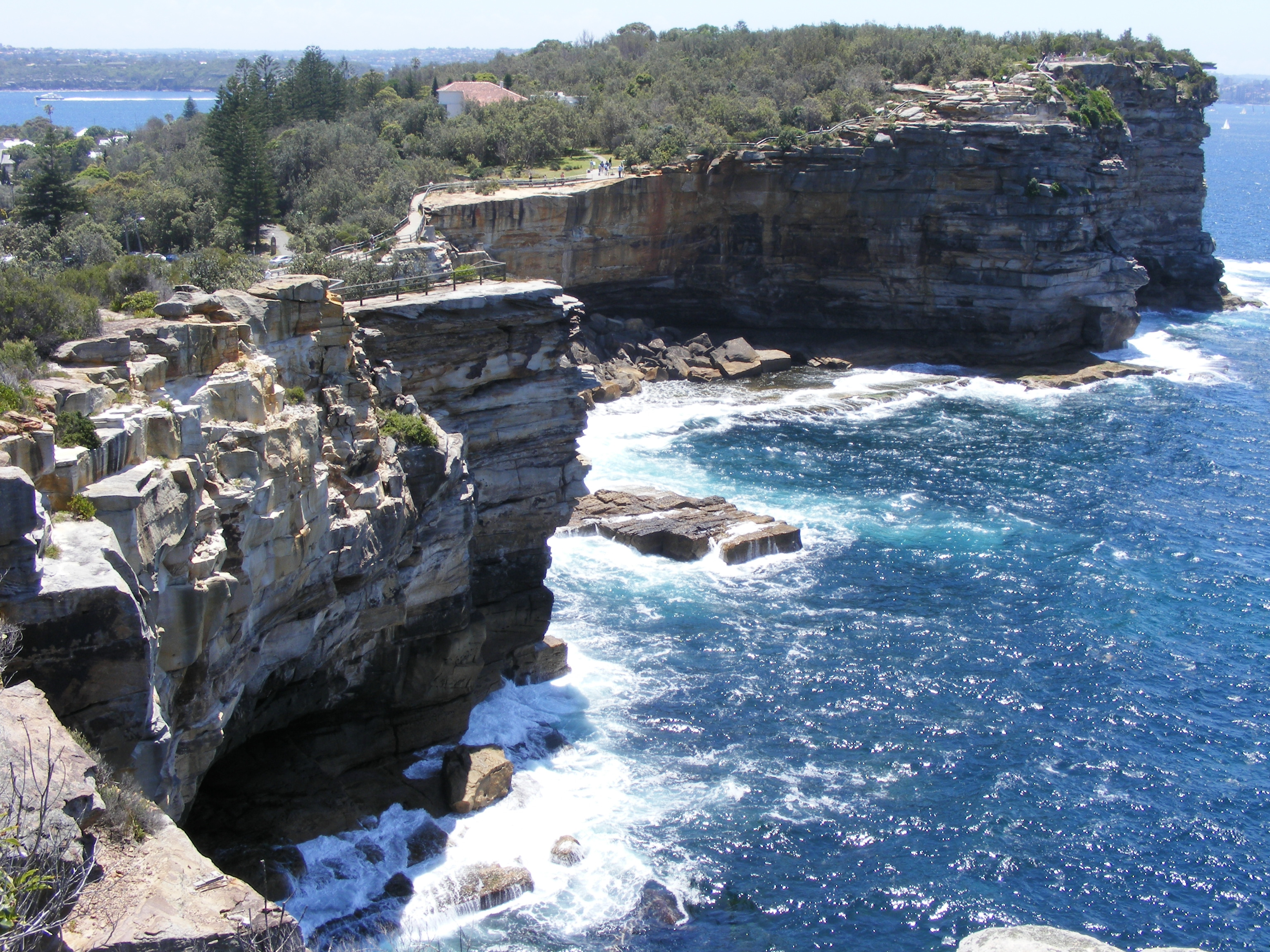
South Head

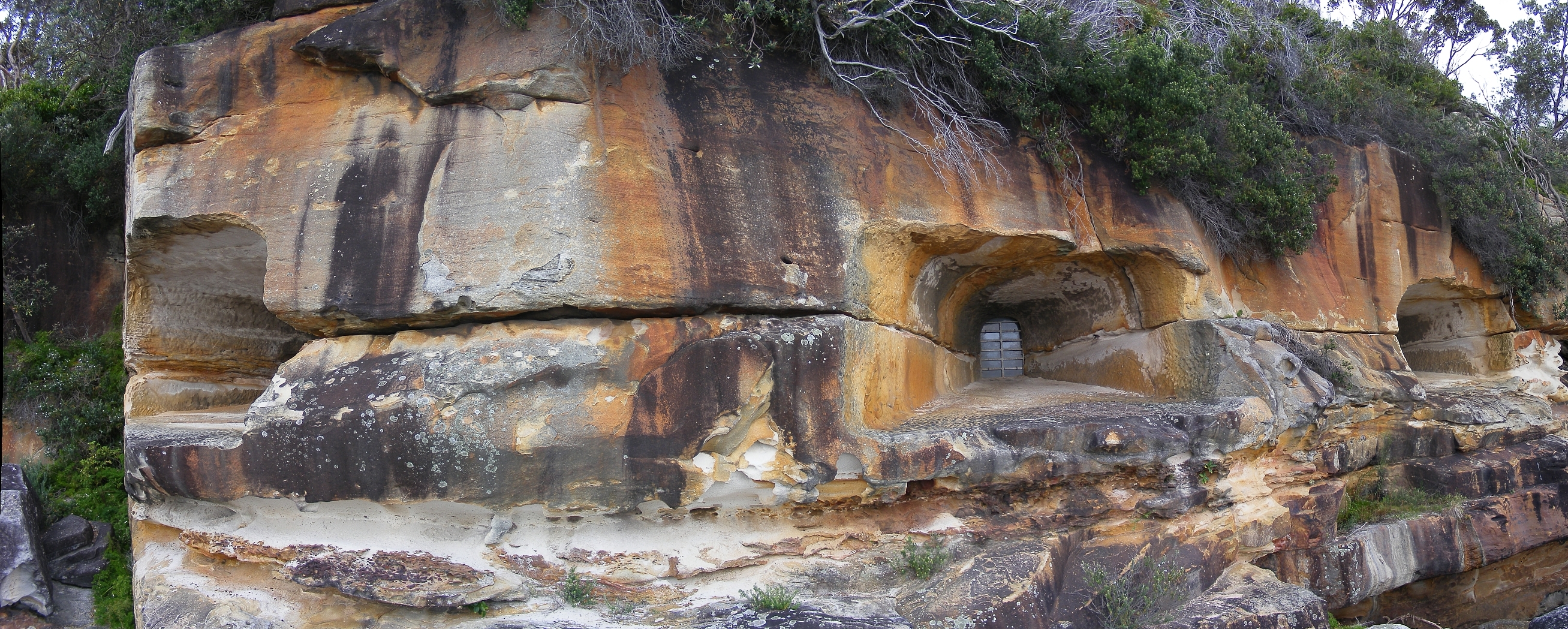
The Beehive Casemate was carved into the cliff face at Obelisk Bay on Sydney Harbour in 1871.

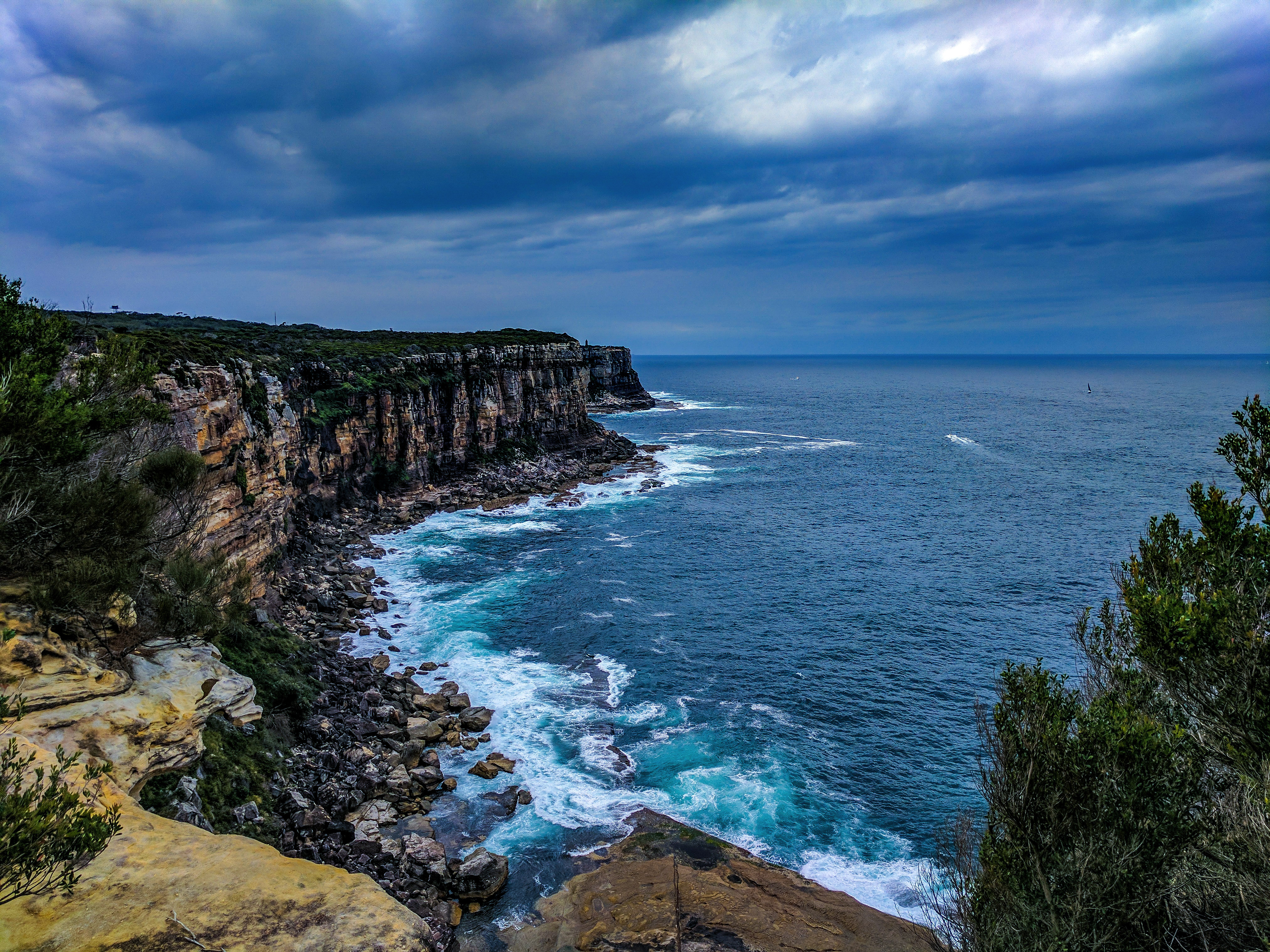
Cliffs lying towards the Pacific Ocean

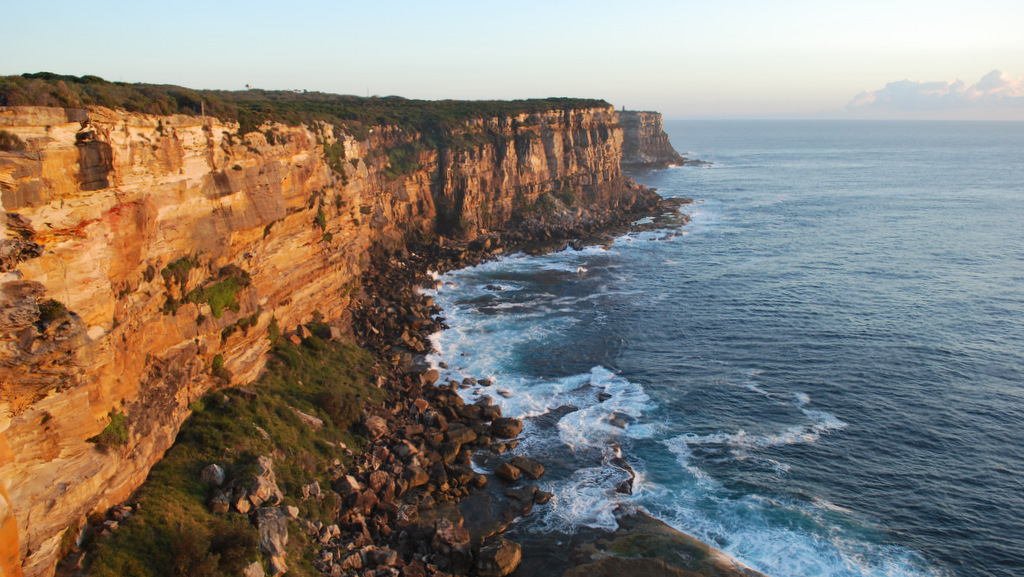
Sandstone cliff view

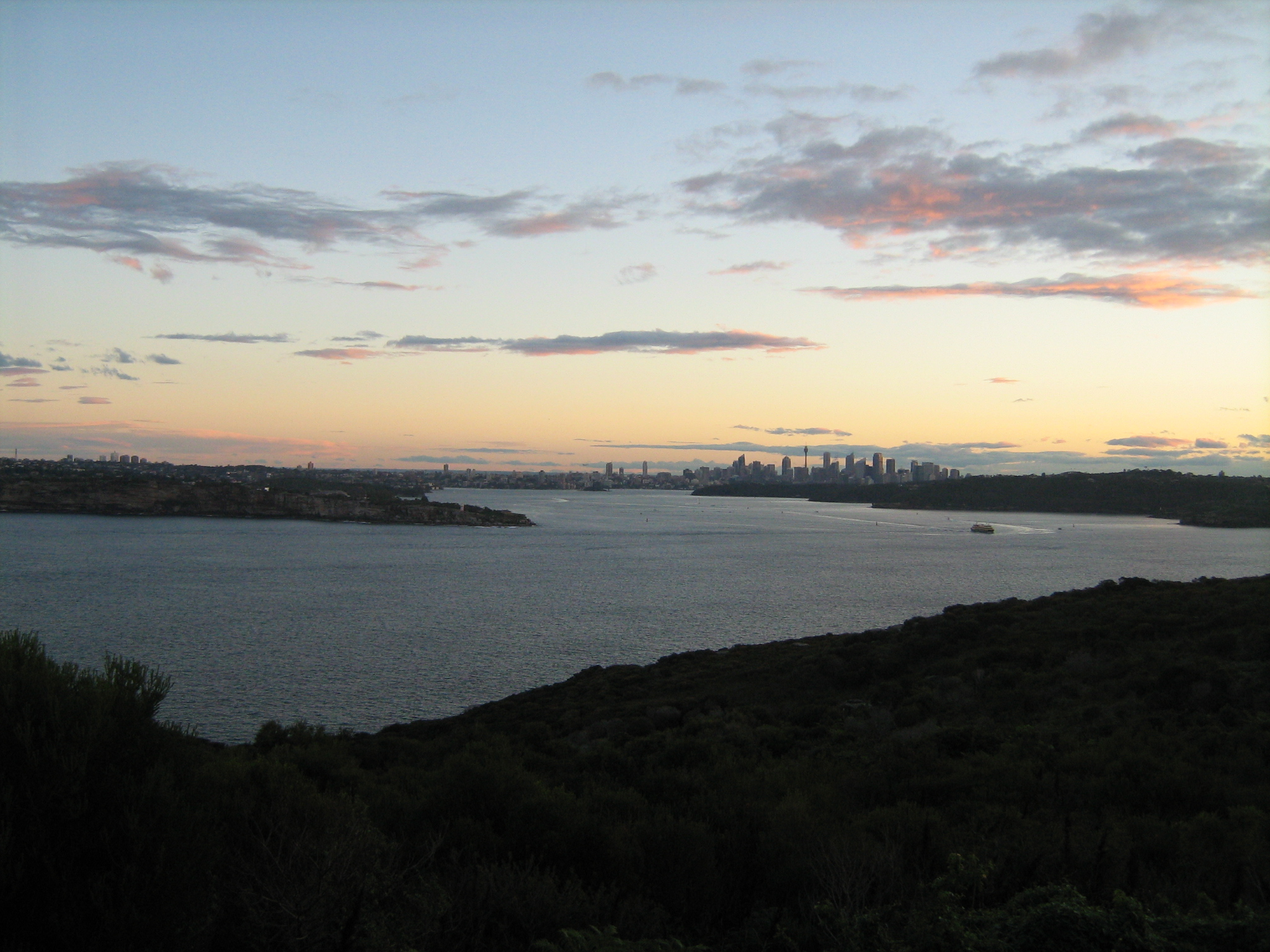
Sydney CBD view

North Head is a headland south-east of the suburb of Manly. It is part of Sydney Harbour National Park. The headland is a promontory of sandstone and is 3.85 square kilometres (1.49 sq mi) in area.

=== Sydney Quarantine station ===
The heritage-listed former Quarantine Station is located on North Head and is one of the few facilities that operated in each state of Australia from the mid-to-late-1800s until the 1980s. From 1828, Spring Cove, on the western side of North Head, was used to quarantine new arrivals to Sydney to minimise the spread of communicable diseases such as cholera, smallpox and whooping cough, amongst other communicable diseases. In 1832, the whole area of North Head was set aside for a quarantine station. A permanent quarantine facility was set up in 1837 and continued to operate until 1984. The buildings and site was added to the New South Wales State Heritage Register on 2 April 1999, the entire 277-hectare (680-acre) North Head site to the Australian National Heritage List on 12 May 2006, and now forms part of the Sydney Harbour National Park.

The site contains the remnants of Colonial New South Wales period buildings and equipment which were the best available means of combating major contagious diseases and hygiene-related conditions brought to the colony by ship. Soon after Federation the Commonwealth Government initiated a major building and infrastructure program which also remains largely intact today. This program included similar, but smaller, quarantine stations around Australian ports, of which North Head is the only remaining example. This site dealt with major shipping-related epidemic outbreaks which took place up until the 1940s. As such, the quarantine complex represents one of the most complete collection of buildings, equipment and a setting showing how life was lived among the struggles and successes in public health of Australia's past.

After 1945 the requirements for quarantine changed to small air-travel family groups serving periods of observation due to a lack of required inoculations. To these groups the site provided a scenic haven in a rustic historic setting. Many of the inscriptions on the local sandstone outcrops record the names and reasons why previous colonial and latter occupants found themselves in such a place. The buildings remain much as they had been in a former age and provided an opportunity for air-travel 'patients' to become acquainted with a unique collection of historic ephemera. In 1970 the then Officer-in-Charge at the station, Herbert Lavaring, was awarded a Queens Birthday Honors Award (BEM) for his efforts in keeping the historic site preserved while also creating a practical, enriching environment for patients and the public to enjoy. The steam-powered laundry and fumigation autoclaves are a unique collection of industrial technology from the past; they provide an insight into the technology required to deal with combating hygiene-related and other readily communicable diseases in an age before antibiotics and vaccinations.

In 1975, Vietnamese refugees were housed there, and in 1975 and 1976, Cyclone Tracy victims from Darwin, Northern Territory were also housed there. The station was finally closed in 1984 and the management of the site passed to the NSW National Parks & Wildlife Service. The facility is now a tourist facility and part of the former Quarantine Station may be leased for accommodation.

The nearby Inner North Head clifftops have many inscriptions from the quarantine period as well as the remnants of 1940s coastal defenses in the form of two gun sites, a range-sighting post, four ammunition storage bunkers and a fortified outhouse. This location has been the site of erosion and geo-technical instability. It may be subject to natural rockfalls as the erosion process continues.

=== Defence facilities ===
From 1934, defence facilities were installed on the headland but were wound down in 1945. From 1953, there was a School of Artillery, which used the former defence facilities. The harbour reserve was established in 1979. The School of Artillery relocated to Puckapunyal army base in Victoria in 1998, but an artillery museum remained on the headland. In 2001, the site was passed to the Sydney Harbour Federation Trust for management. In 2010 the artillery collection was moved to The Army Museum Bandiana in Bandiana, Victoria; the Trust plans to establish an exhibition on the defence of Sydney on the site. There are still remains of the gun emplacements and artificial tunnels used by the army, many of which can be seen by the public or on guided tours.

=== Australian Institute of Police Management ===
Also located on North Head is the Australian Institute of Police Management, housed in a secure compound which has been the 'Seamen's Quarters' of the quarantine station, a place where sailors with acquired STIs were treated and securely confined behind high sandstone walls (prior to the development of modern antibiotics).

== South Head ==
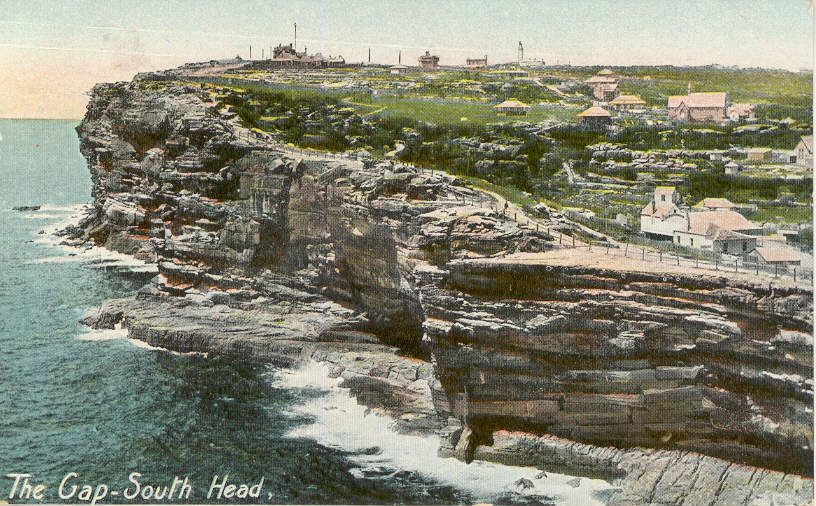
Historic postcard of South Head

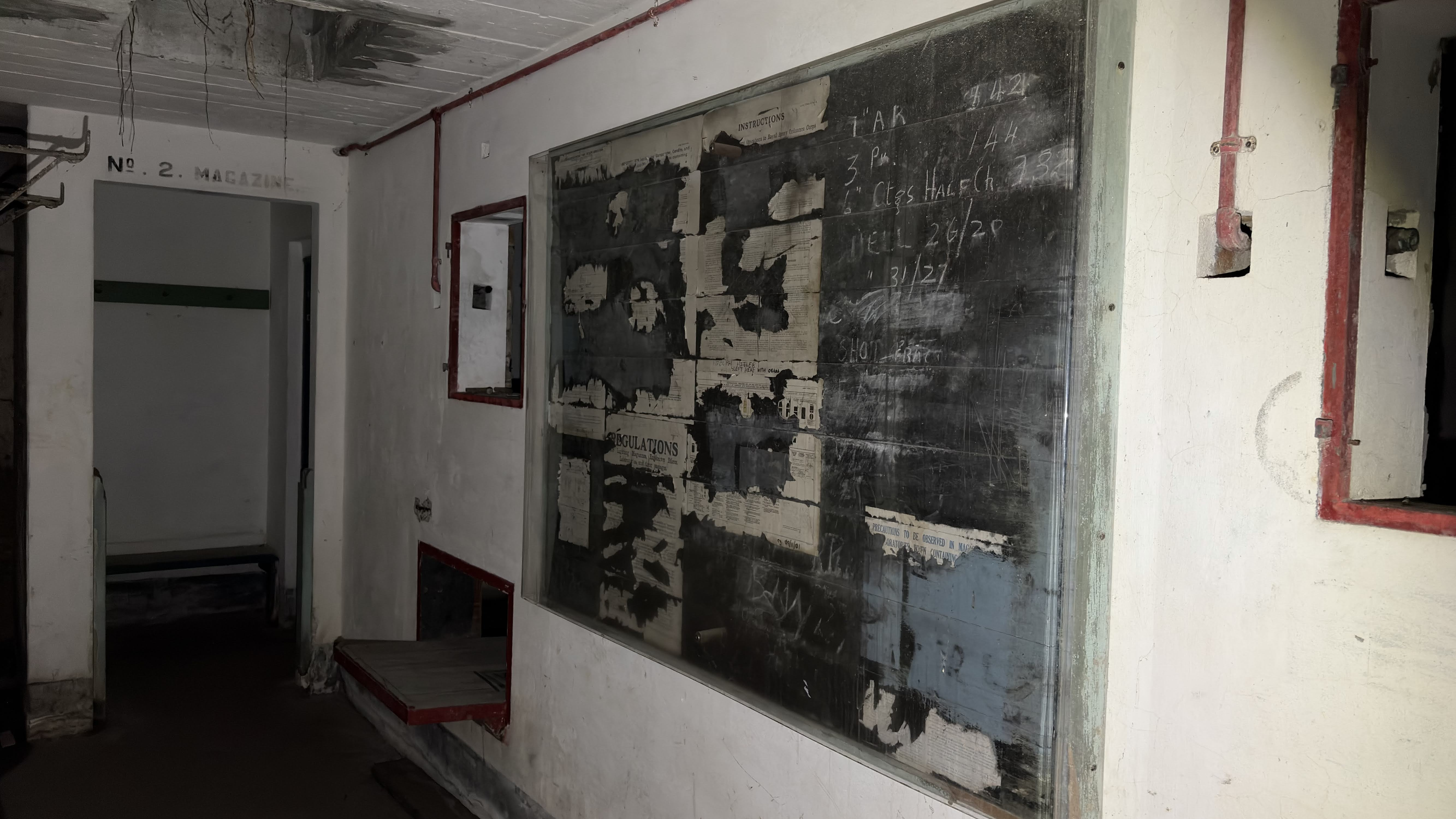
A WWII-era noticeboard in the abandoned tunnels under the № 2 Magazine at South Head.

South Head is a headland, part of Sydney Harbour National Park, to the north of the suburb of Watsons Bay.

A twenty-minute foreshore walk on the South Head Heritage Trail offers views of Middle Head, Manly, North Head and the Tasman Sea. Starting at Camp Cove Beach, an 1870s cobblestone path leads first to Lady Bay (also known as Lady Jane) Beach, one of three in Sydney where nude bathing is lawful. It then loops around the headland, passing Hornby Lighthouse, its lightkeepers' cottages, and several gun emplacements from the end of the 19th century.

HMAS Watson, the Royal Australian Navy training base, is also located at South Head.

== Middle Head ==
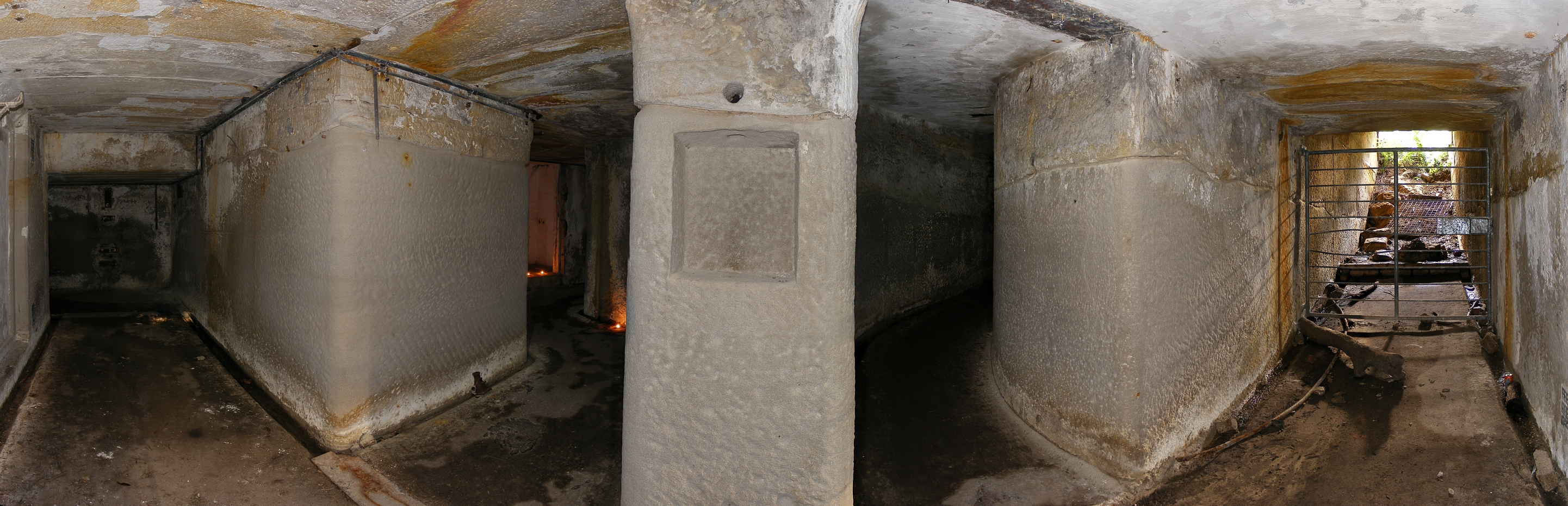
An underground fortress tunnel network situated on Middle Head, Mosman; part of the Middle Head Fortifications tunnel system

Middle Head is a headland between North Head and South Head, beside Middle Harbour. It is part of Sydney Harbour National Park.

Middle Head has an extensive network of defence fortifications and tunnels, including the Middle Head Fortifications, the Georges Head Battery and the Lower Georges Heights Commanding Position and other forts located around Sydney Harbour. The fortifications feature "Tiger Cages", where the military trained soldiers by simulating prisoner of war conditions in Vietnam.

HMAS Penguin is located at Middle Harbour.

== Heritage listings ==
Middle Head has a number of heritage-listed sites, including:

- Middle Head Road: Middle Head Fortifications

== See also ==
- Geography of Sydney
- Bradleys Head
- Clark Island
- Cockatoo Island
- Dobroyd Head
- Goat Island
- Rodd Island
- Shark Island
