= Wedding Cake (disambiguation) =

A wedding cake is a cake served at a wedding reception.

Wedding Cake may also refer to:

In architecture

- Wedding-cake style, buildings with many tiers giving the appearance of a wedding cake
- Wedding Cake House (Kennebunk, Maine), a much-photographed house
- Eastern Channel Pile Light and Western Channel Pile Light, lighthouses in Sydney Harbour
- Monument to Vittorio Emanuele II in Rome
- Amex House, American Express's European HQ in Brighton, England
- No. 1 Croydon, an office block in Croydon, south London

In other

- Wedding Cake Island off Sydney, Australia
- Amazing Wedding Cakes, a US TV series on cake decorating
- "Wedding Cake Island", a song on the Bird Noises album
- Mount Taipingot in the Mariana Islands
- "The Wedding Cake", a 1969 song by Connie Francis
