= Eastern Channel Pile Light =

Lighthouse in Sydney, Australia

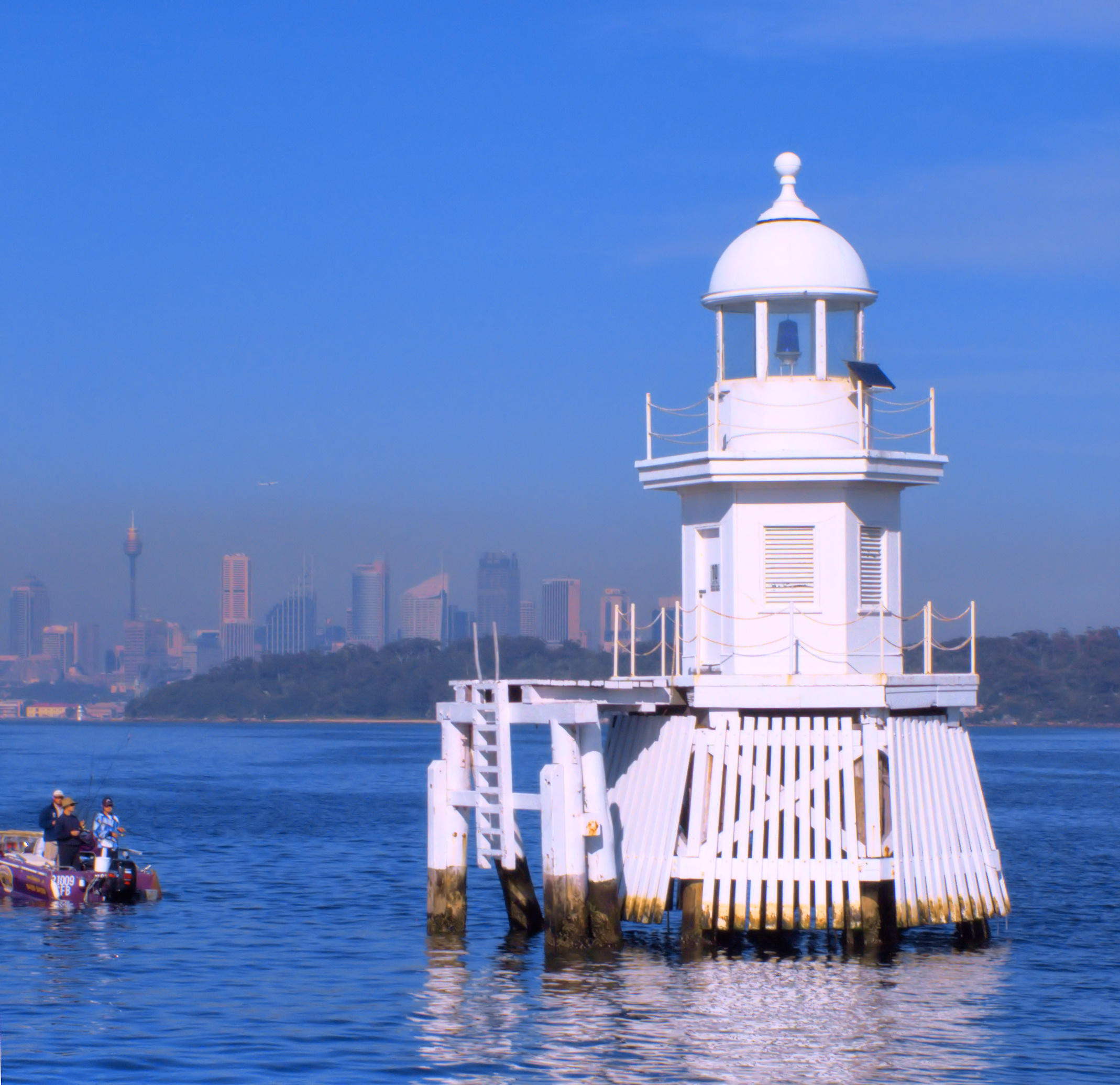
- Eastern Channel Pile Light
- Location: Sydney Harbour, New South Wales, Australia
- Coordinates: 33°50′30.47″S 151°16′18.52″E

Tower
- Constructed: 1908
- Foundation: piles
- Construction: concrete tower
- Height: 36 feet (11 m)
- Shape: octagonal prism lantern with two galleries and lantern
- Markings: white tower and lantern
- Operator: Port Authority of New South Wales

Light
- First lit: 1924
- Focal height: 31 feet (9.4 m)
- Range: 9 nautical miles (17 km)
- Characteristic: Oc G 3s.

The Eastern Channel Pile Light, also known as the East Wedding Cake due to its shape, is an active pile lighthouse located on Sydney Harbour, New South Wales, Australia, off Laings Point, Vaucluse. It marks the eastern end of the Sow and Pigs Reef.

== History ==
Eastern Channel Pile Light was established in 1924 together with Western Channel Pile Light. It is constructed from concrete bottom (originally known as the "gas house") with a copper top and a wooden stakes skirt. It was originally gas powered (probably a carbide lamp), and was later converted to solar power.

== Site operation ==
The light is operated by the Port Authority of New South Wales. It is accessible only by boat, and is closed to the public.
