= Moreton Bay Pile Light =

Former lighthouse in southern Queensland, Australia

Moreton Bay Pile Light (first light)
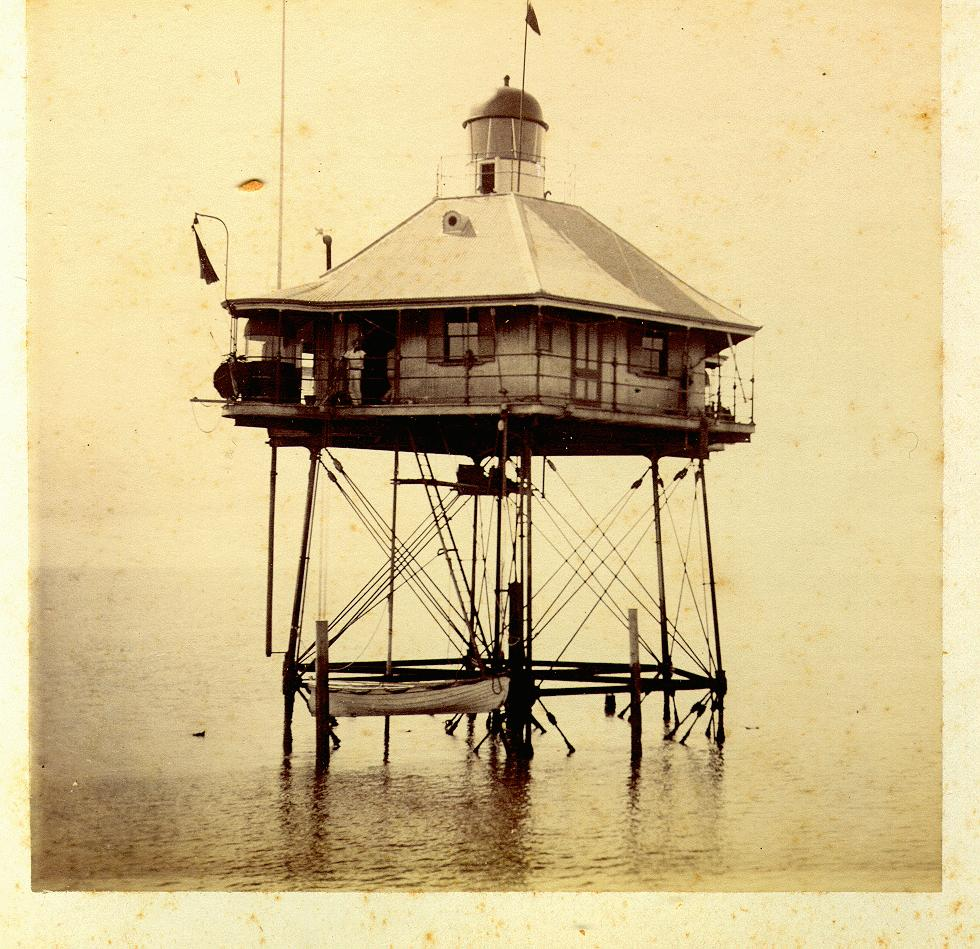
- The first Moreton Bay Pile Light ca. 1880
- Location: Moreton Bay; Queensland; Australia
- Coordinates: 27°19′28″S 153°10′12″E

Tower
- Constructed: 1884 (first); 1913 (second); 1952 (third)
- Foundation: steel piles
- Construction: wrought and cast iron
- Automated: 1952
- Shape: hexagonal frustum keeper's house with the lantern on the roof

Light
- Deactivated: 1913 (first); 1952 (second); 1966 (third)
- Focal height: 44 feet (13 m) (first); 22 feet (6.7 m) (third)
- Lens: 4th order dioptric
- Characteristic: Oc W 12s. (first and second); Fl WR 3s (third)

Moreton Bay Pile Light was a pile lighthouse positioned at the mouth of Brisbane River, in Moreton Bay, Queensland, Australia, marking the entrance to the port of Brisbane. The light's early history was closely related to the dredging of the Brisbane River. It was established in 1884 as a result of a new channel that was cut, and relocated in 1913 due to another change in the channels. The structure was badly damaged by a barge in 1945 and finally destroyed when hit by a tanker in 1949. An automated light operated on the ruins until 1966–1967 when it was removed.

== The first light ==
Dredging of the first channel through the Brisbane River and into the Brisbane Port began in 1862. Though the path was originally planned by Lieutenant George Poynter Heath, RN, who was then appointed marine surveyor and was later to be appointed the portmaster for Queensland, the path was later changed as the superintendent of the dredge, Thomas Francis, located what he believed to be a better path. After much debate and a select committee of the Queensland Legislative Assembly, it was decided to continue with the path suggested by Francis. The dredging of the channel was completed in 1866 and it was known as the Francis Channel. However, Heath did not give up on his original path, and by 1882 work had begun dredging a path according to Heath's original path and by 1883 the new channel was operational.

As the new channel was cut, a light was required to replace the 40-year-old lightship Rose, which was not suitable to be used at the exposed end of the new channel. The light was erected at 27°19′28″S 153°10′12″E together with signal and telegraph station by government staff. The structure was designed by Heath. It was hexagonal in form, containing six rooms of equal dimensions housing three persons, and had a total height of 98 feet (30 m). The seven piles supporting the structure, one at each point and one at the middle, were made of wrought iron, 5.5 inches (140 mm) diameter, with 4 inches (100 mm) screws. They were screwed 24 feet (7.3 m) in the mud, in water which was 16 feet (4.9 m) at low tide and 23 feet (7.0 m) at high tide.

The operation of the lighthouse was delayed by bad weather. It was first used on 31 May 1884. The installation of the telegraph line to Brisbane was delayed even longer and it was only installed on 8 August. The apparatus was a 4th order dioptric lens and it was displayed at 44 feet (13 m) above high-water mark, at the top of the structure. The light characteristic shown was occulting for two seconds every 12 seconds during flood tide and fixed during the ebb. It was also sectored, showing white light when the ships are in the direction for the deep water channel and red otherwise, and had an intensified sector using reflected light from the unused direction.

In addition to the task of pointing ships into the channel, the lighthouse also signaled ships about the state of the tide. During the day this was performed using two day signals installed on two corners of the structure, while during the night two 6th order dioptric lights showing different colors coded the state of the tide. The different colours were changed manually, by lowering glass cylinders over the lanterns, which could be done from inside the structure. Records of the tide were also kept automatically by floats in tubes which graphed the tide level. The graphs were replaced every month and were sent to Greenwich where they were kept.

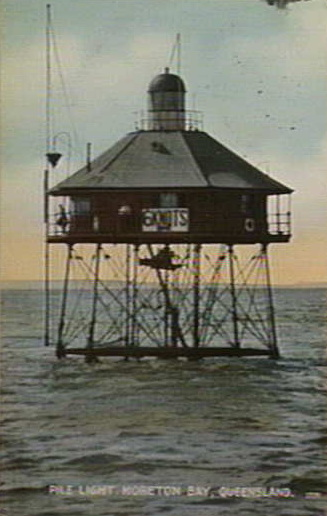
The second Moreton Bay Pile Light ca. 1913

== The second light ==
=== Establishment ===
A recommendation to improve the channel was made by Lindon Bates in 1901. Bates recommended a new path, the cutting of which commenced in 1908 and was finished on 1 October 1912. With this new cutting the pile light had to be moved to a new position. Anticipating the need, tenders for the construction of the superstructure were published in January 1912 and were accepted by March of that year. On February 11, 1913, the old lighthouse was discontinued, though a small light was attached to the remaining platform which was eventually destroyed in the 1960s.

The new light was constructed at 27°18′45″S 153°12′40″E and exhibited on 27 June 1913. Construction of this new light proved to be a whole different story than the first one due to the soft mud. During testing, an 82-foot (25 m) long test pile sank 20 feet (6.1 m) into the mud by its own weight. The reinforced concrete foundation piles were driven 41 feet (12 m) into the mud, and the structure was bolted to them. 5,000 long tons (5,100 t) of sand were also dumped on the area. The lens was transferred from the old lighthouse and the new light kept the characteristic as well, occulting for two seconds every 12 seconds during flood tide and fixed otherwise. It also kept the sectoring and the intensification, as well as the tidal signals.

=== Damage and destruction ===
On 3 March 1945, the pile light was badly damaged when hit by a US refrigerated barge towed by a tug. The lighthouse keepers remained on duty, and the lighthouse was soon repaired, though some damage remained. On 17 October 1949, the lighthouse was rammed by the 15,000-ton British tanker Wave Protector and destroyed. The three light keepers were thrown overboard and rescued by a lifeboat from the Wave Protector.

== The third light ==
After the destruction of the second pile light a third one was constructed in late 1952. The third lighthouse was constructed on the site of the destroyed second lighthouse, and used some of the steel piles from the old lighthouse as foundation. Its light was fully automated and unmanned. The light source was an acetylene gas lamp. The light was shown at an elevation of 22 feet (6.7 m) and the characteristic shown was one flash every three seconds, originally white at 335°-91° and red otherwise (Fl. W.R. 3s), though this soon changed to white at 155°-271° and red otherwise. The structure was finally removed in 1966–1967 by the barge Hammerhead.

== See also ==
- List of lighthouses in Australia
