= Pile lighthouse =

Type of lighthouse

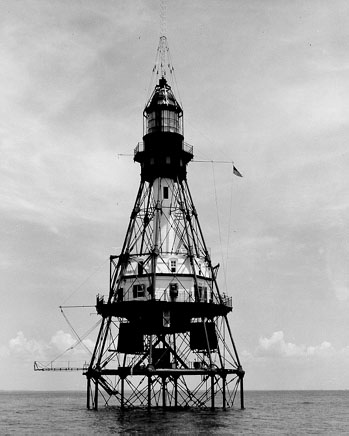
The Fowey Rocks Light

A pile lighthouse is a type of lighthouse found in Australia, the United Kingdom and United States. In the United States they are found primarily in Florida, including on open reefs adjacent to the Florida Keys.

The pile lighthouses on the reefs in Florida are tall skeletal towers, with living and working quarters set high above the reach of storm waves. Some of the lights were converted screw-pile lighthouses, while others were built on piles driven directly into the sea bed.

== List of pile lights ==
=== Australia ===
- South Channel Pile Light, Victoria
- Moreton Bay Pile Light
- Eastern Channel Pile Light, Western Channel Pile Light
- Shark Island Light

=== Florida, United States ===
- Alligator Reef Light
- Carysfort Reef Light
- Fowey Rocks Light
- Sombrero Key Light
- American Shoal Light
- Sand Key Light

=== Scotland, United Kingdom ===
- Larick Beacon, also known as Tayport Pile Lighthouse

=== England, United Kingdom ===
- Burnham-on-Sea Low Lighthouse the 9 legged light
