= Western Channel Pile Light =

Lighthouse in Sydney, Australia

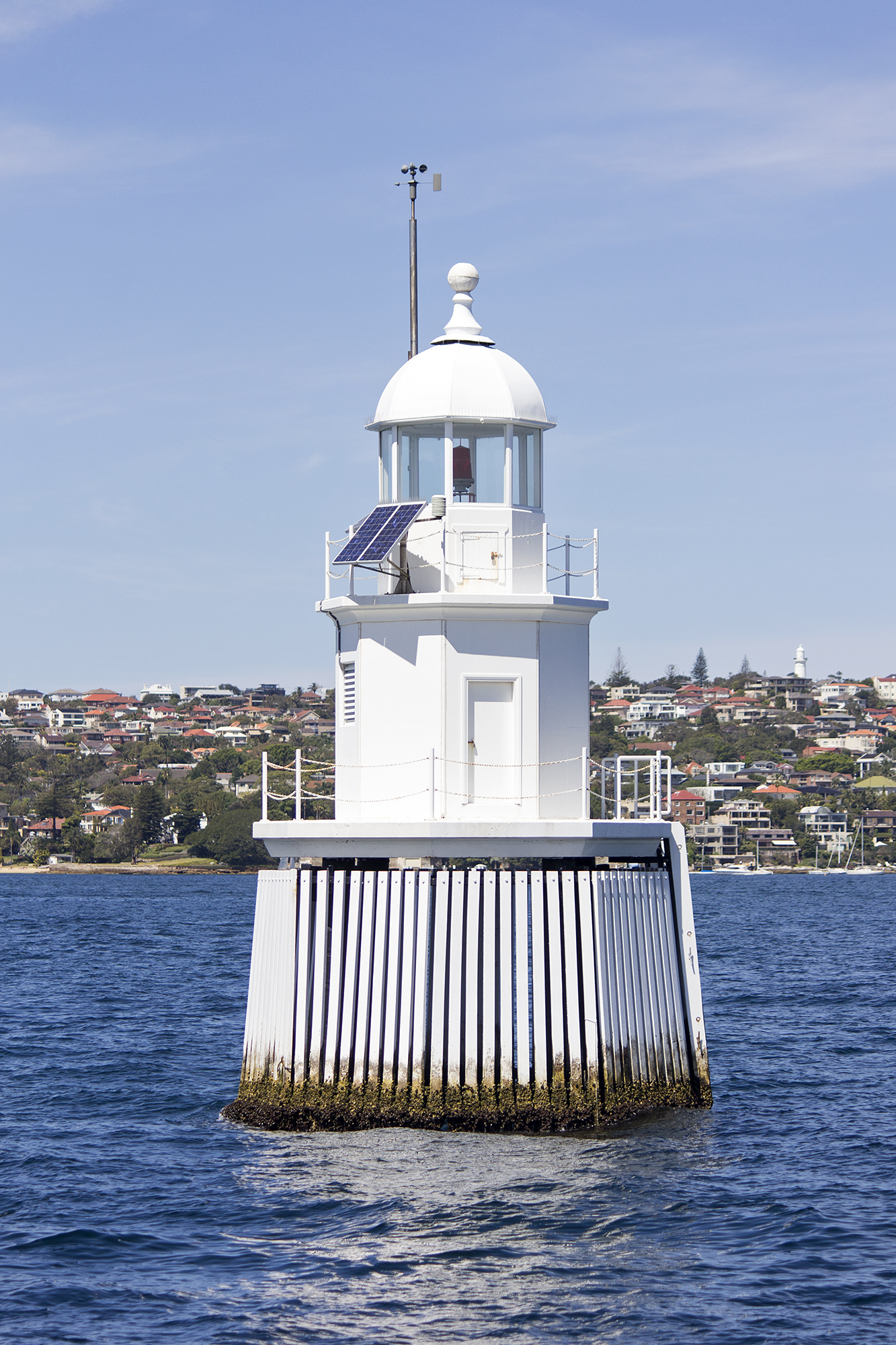
- Western Channel Pile Light in 2013
- Location: Sydney Harbour, New South Wales, Australia
- Coordinates: 33°50′S 151°16′E

Tower
- Constructed: 1908 (first); 1924 (second)
- Foundation: 12 piles
- Construction: concrete (tower)
- Height: 8 m (26 ft)
- Shape: octagonal tower with double balcony and lantern
- Markings: White
- Power source: solar power
- Operator: Port Authority of New South Wales

Light
- First lit: 2008 (rebuilt)
- Deactivated: 2006–2008
- Focal height: 8 m (26 ft)
- Range: 5 nmi (9.3 km; 5.8 mi)
- Characteristic: Oc R 3s

The Western Channel Pile Light, also known as the West Wedding Cake due to its shape, is an active pile lighthouse located on Sydney Harbour, New South Wales, Australia, off Georges Head, Mosman. It marks the western end of the Sow and Pigs Reef. It collapsed in December 2006 and was reconstructed and restored to operation in December 2008.

== History ==
Western Channel Pile Light was completed in 1924, replacing a marker buoy, together with Eastern Channel Pile Light. It was constructed from concrete bottom (originally known as the "gas house"), supported by twelve piles, with a copper top and a wooden stakes skirt. It was originally gas powered (probably a carbide lamp), and was later converted to solar power.

In 1996 a 10 metres (33 ft) stainless steel mast, serving as a weather station, was installed on the structure, providing information about weather conditions in the harbour.

The lighthouse was due for replacement in 2007, and a budget was set, but on 12 December 2006 it collapsed, as one or two of the supporting piles broke. Sydney Ports Corporation employed Waterways Constructions to reconstruct the lighthouse. The new tower was designed to look as similar as possible to its predecessor, using the salvaged and renovated lantern house, and a new lower section. Reconstruction completed and the light returned to operation on 18 December 2008.

== Site operation ==
The light is operated by the Port Authority of New South Wales. It is accessible only by boat, and is closed to the public.
