= Port Jackson =

Body of water in Sydney, New South Wales, Australia

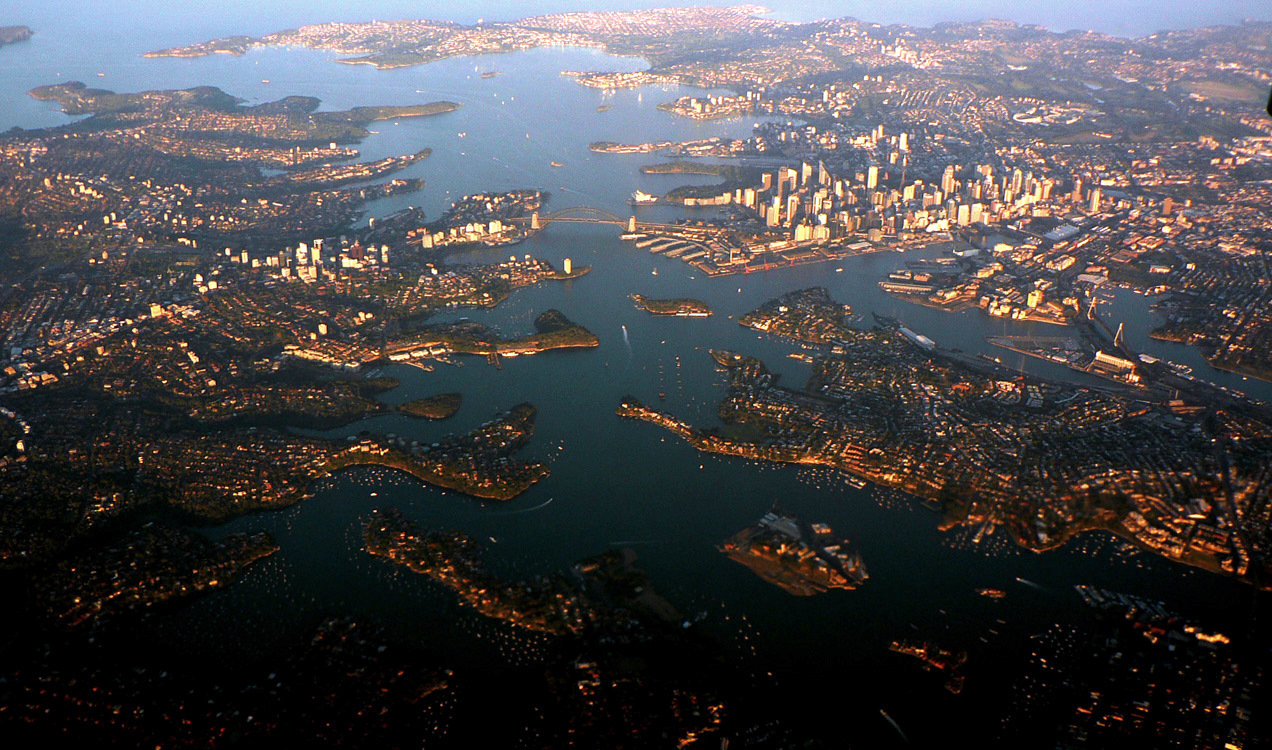
- Port Jackson seen from the air in 2006

- Location within east Sydney
- Location: Sydney, New South Wales, Australia
- Coordinates: 33°51′30″S 151°14′00″E
- River sources: Parramatta, Lane Cove, Middle Harbour
- Ocean/sea sources: Tasman Sea of the South Pacific Ocean
- Basin countries: Australia
- Islands: Clark, Shark, Goat, Fort Denison
- Settlements: Sydney

Port Jackson, commonly known as Sydney Harbour, is a natural harbour on the east coast of Australia, around which the city of Sydney is situated. It consists of the waters of Sydney Harbour, Middle Harbour, North Harbour, and the Lane Cove and Parramatta rivers. The harbour is an inlet of the Tasman Sea, which in turn is part of the South Pacific Ocean. It is the location of significant landmarks such as the Sydney Opera House and Sydney Harbour Bridge. As the location of the first permanent European settlement on the Australian mainland, Port Jackson has played a key role in the history of Sydney, as well as its social and economic development.

Port Jackson, in the early days of the colony, was also used as a shorthand for Sydney and its environs. Thus, many botanists, see, e.g., Robert Brown's Prodromus Florae Novae Hollandiae et Insulae Van Diemen, described their specimens as having been collected at Port Jackson.

Many recreational events are based on or around the harbour itself, particularly Sydney New Year's Eve celebrations. The harbour is also the starting point of the Sydney to Hobart Yacht Race.

The waterways of Port Jackson are managed by Transport for NSW. Sydney Harbour National Park protects a number of islands and foreshore areas, swimming spots, bushwalking tracks and picnic areas. The harbour is a global hotspot for marine and estuarine diversity.

== History ==
Sydney Cove, Port Jackson in the County of Cumberland – from a drawing made by Francis Fowkes in 1788

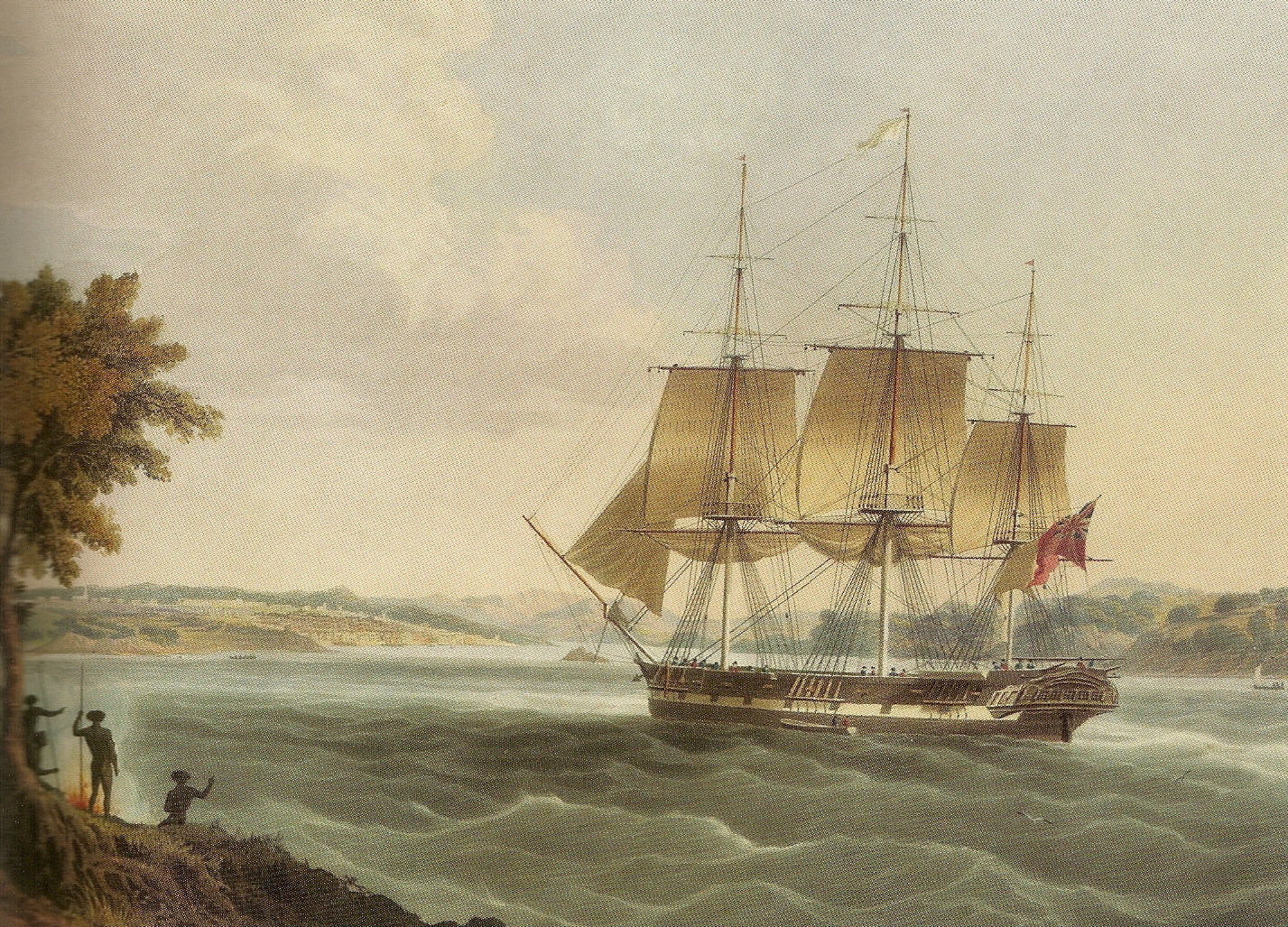
This 1830 painting shows the Mellish entering the harbour. Ships importing resources from India played a vital role in establishing Sydney.

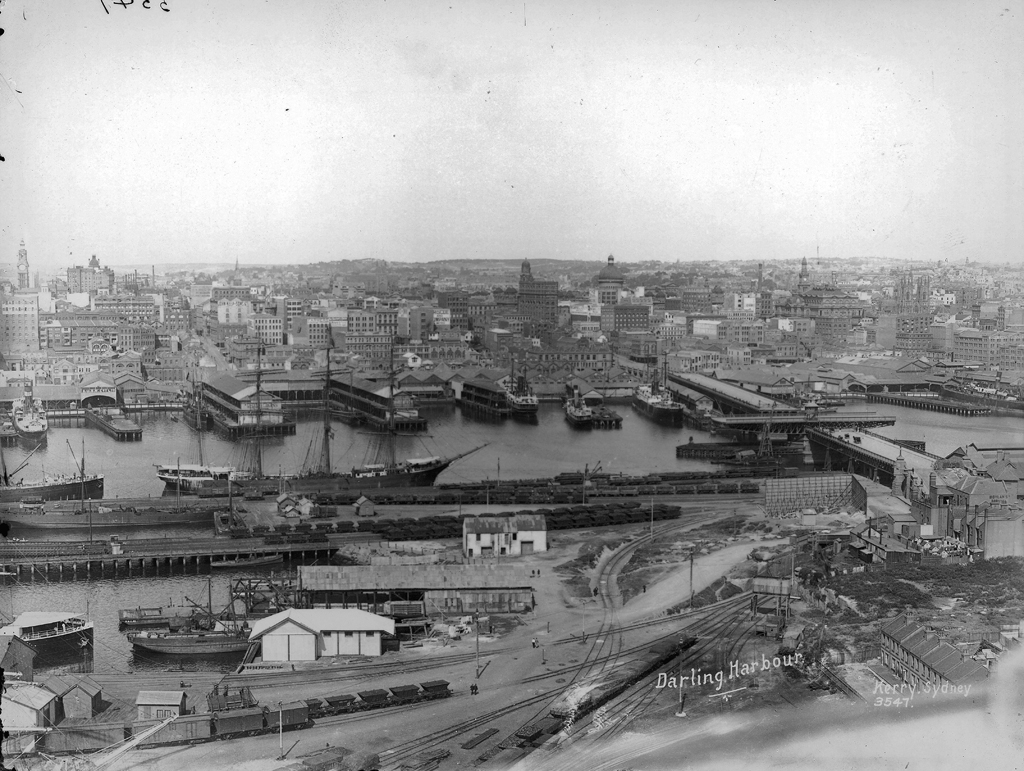
Clipper ships in Darling Harbour in 1900

At the time of the European arrival and colonisation, the land around Port Jackson was inhabited by the Eora clans, including the Gadigal, Cammeraygal, and Wangal. The Gadigal inhabited the land stretching along the south side of Port Jackson from what is now South Head, in an arc west to the present Darling Harbour. The Cammeraygal lived on the northern side of the harbour. The area along the southern banks of the Parramatta River to Rose Hill belonged to the Wangal. The Eora inhabited Port Jackson (Sydney Harbour), south to the Georges River and west to Parramatta.

=== Cook's naming of Port Jackson ===
The first recorded European discovery of Sydney Harbour was by Lieutenant James Cook in 1770. Cook named the inlet after Sir George Jackson, one of the Lords Commissioners of the British Admiralty, and Judge Advocate of the Fleet. As the Endeavour sailed past the entrance at Sydney Heads, Cook wrote in his journal "at noon we were...about 2 or 3 miles from the land and abrest of a bay or harbour within there appeared to be a safe anchorage which I called Port Jackson."

=== First Fleet ===
Eighteen years later, Port Jackson saw the arrival of the First Fleet. On 21 January 1788, after arriving at Botany Bay, Governor Arthur Phillip took a longboat and two cutters up the coast to sound the entrance and examine Cook's Port Jackson. Phillip first stayed overnight at Camp Cove, just inside the South Head, then moved up the harbour, landing at Sydney Cove and then Manly Cove, before returning to Botany Bay on the afternoon of 24 January. Phillip returned to Sydney Cove in HM Armed Tender Supply on 26 January 1788, where he established the first colony in Australia, later to become the city of Sydney. In his first dispatch from the colony back to England, Governor Phillip noted that:

We got into Port Jackson early in the Afternoon, and had the satisfaction of finding the finest Harbour in the World, in which a thousand Sail of the line may ride in the most perfect security...I fixed on the one [cove] that had the best spring of Water, and in which the Ships can Anchor so close to the Shore, that at a very small expence...

— Governor Arthur Phillip, 15 May 1788.

Port Jackson was described as a "capacious harbour, equal, if not superior to any yet known in the world", that "sheltered anchorage for the ships" and provided "a suitable landing place on rocks on the western side of the cove, relatively level land at the head of the cove, and a run of fresh water", in addition to it being "capable of affording security to a much larger fleet than would probably ever seek for shelter or security in it." Royal Navy officer David Blackburn also described it as a "fine Harbour as Any in the World, with water for any Number of the Largest ships."

=== Later events ===
The Great White Fleet, the United States Navy battle fleet, arrived in Port Jackson in August 1908 by order of U.S. President Theodore Roosevelt. From 1938, seaplanes landed in Sydney Harbour on Rose Bay, making this Sydney's first international airport.

=== Attack on Sydney Harbour ===
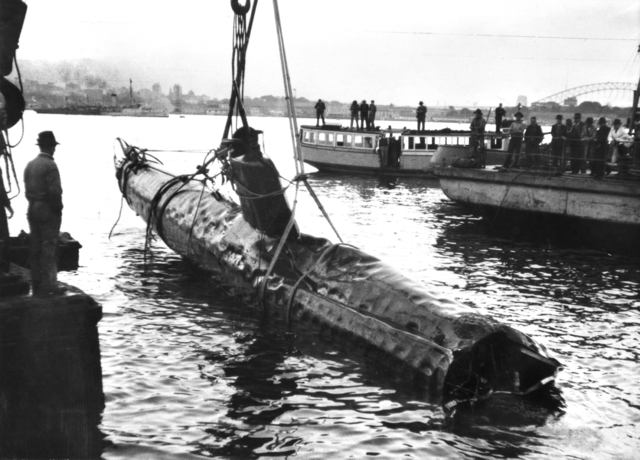
A Japanese Kō-hyōteki class midget submarine M-21 being raised from Taylor's Bay on 1 June 1942

In 1942, to protect Sydney Harbour from a submarine attack, the Sydney Harbour anti-submarine boom net was constructed. It spanned the harbour from Green (Laings) Point, Watsons Bay to the battery at Georges Head, on the other side of the harbour. On the night of 31 May 1942, three Japanese midget submarines entered the harbour, one of which became entangled in the western end of the boom net's central section. Unable to free their submarine, the crew detonated charges, killing themselves in the process. A second midget submarine came to grief in Taylor's Bay, the two crew committing suicide. The third submarine fired two torpedoes at USS Chicago (both missed) before leaving the harbour. In November 2006, this submarine was found off Sydney's Northern Beaches.

The anti-submarine boom net was demolished soon after World War II, and all that remains are the foundations of the old boom net winch house, which can be viewed on Green (Laings) Point, Watsons Bay. Today, the Australian War Memorial has on display a composite of the two midget submarines salvaged from Sydney Harbour. The conning tower of one of the midget submarines is on display at the RAN Heritage Centre, Garden Island, Sydney.

=== Fortifications ===
Fort Denison is a former penal site and defensive facility occupying a small island located north-east of the Royal Botanic Garden in Sydney Harbour.

There are fortifications at Sydney Heads and elsewhere, some of which are now heritage listed. The earliest date from the 1830s, and were designed to defend Sydney from seaborn attack or convict uprisings. There are four historical fortifications located between Taronga Zoo and Middle Head, Mosman, they are: the Middle Head Fortifications, the Georges Head Battery, the Lower Georges Heights Commanding Position and a small fort located on Bradleys Head, known as the Bradleys Head Fortification Complex. The forts were built from sandstone quarried on site and consist of various tunnels, underground rooms, open batteries and casemated batteries, shell rooms, gunpowder magazines, barracks and trenches.

== Geography ==
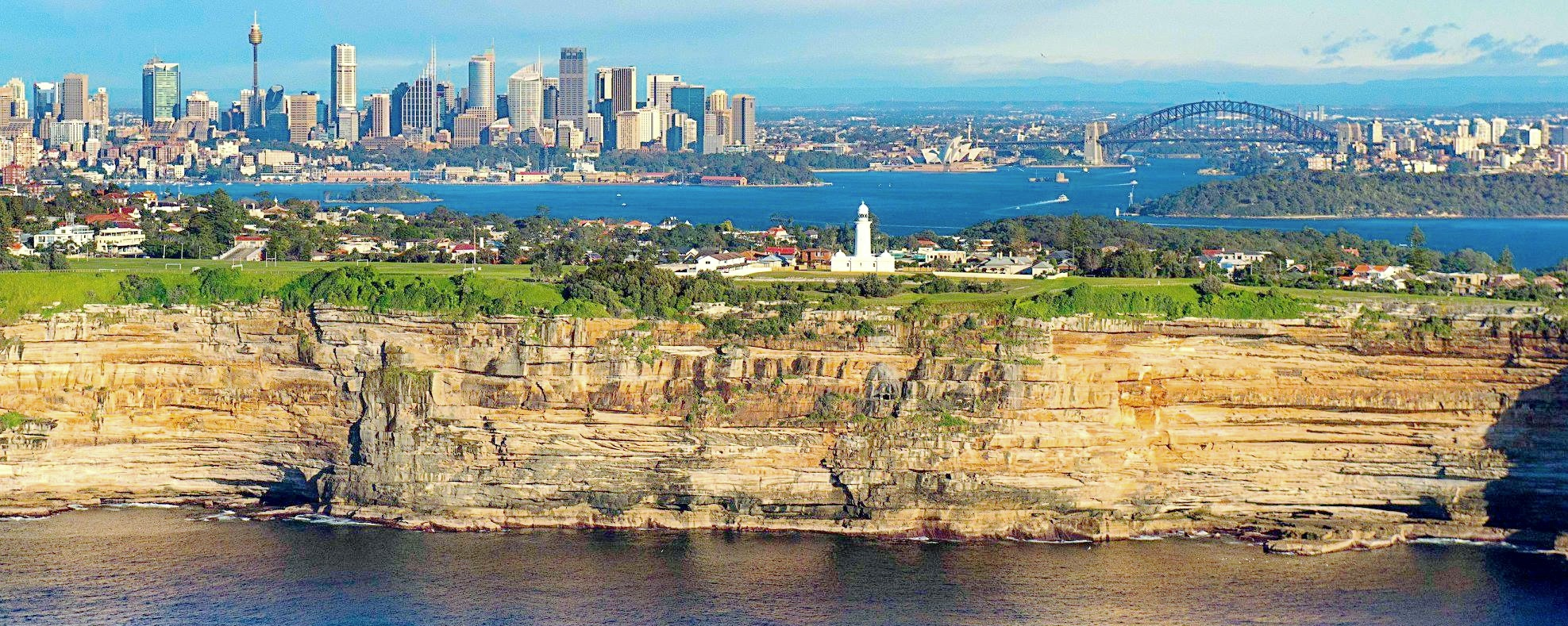
The Harbour as seen aloft from the Tasman Sea

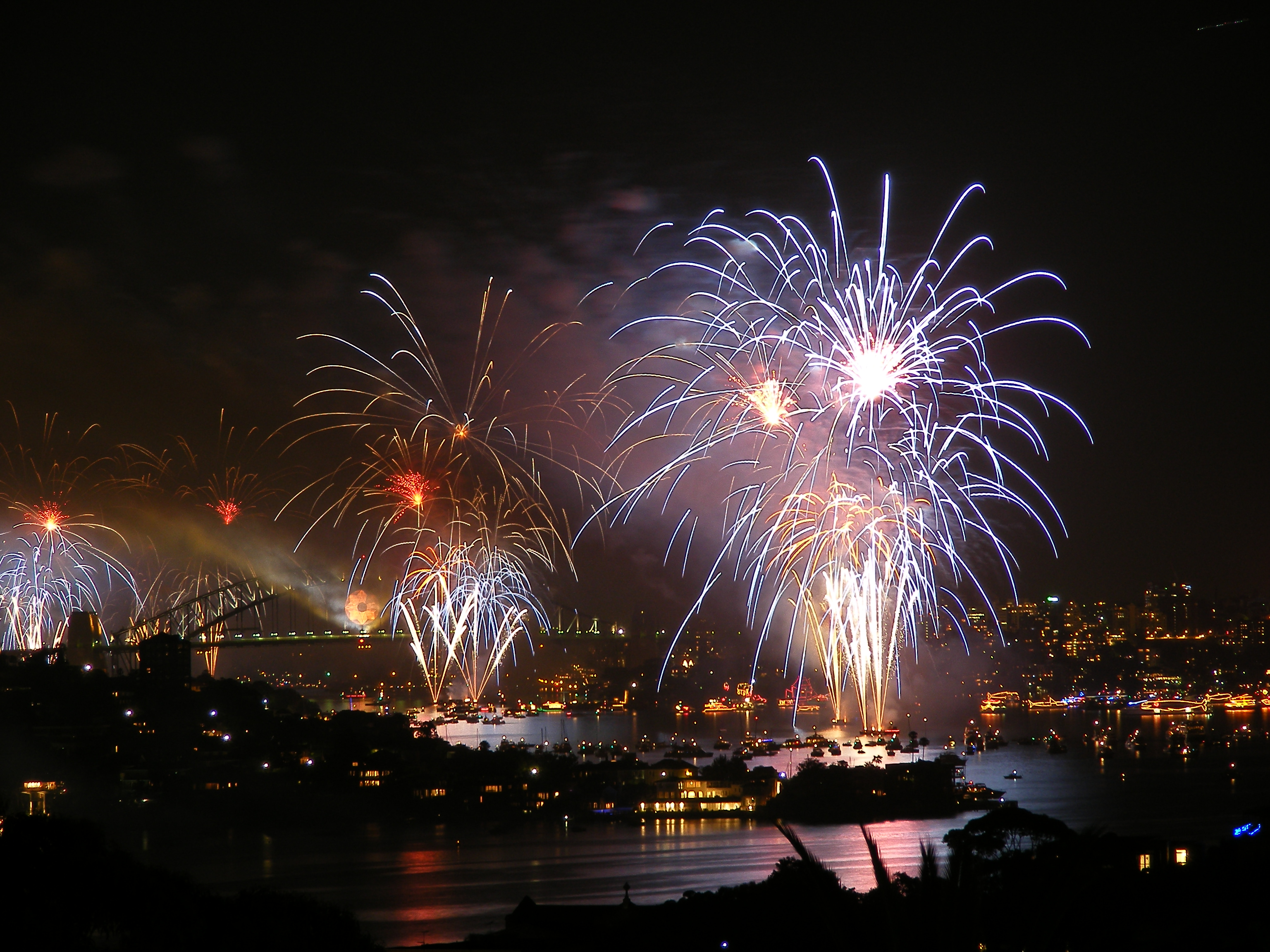
The harbour is the focal point for the Sydney New Year's Eve celebrations.

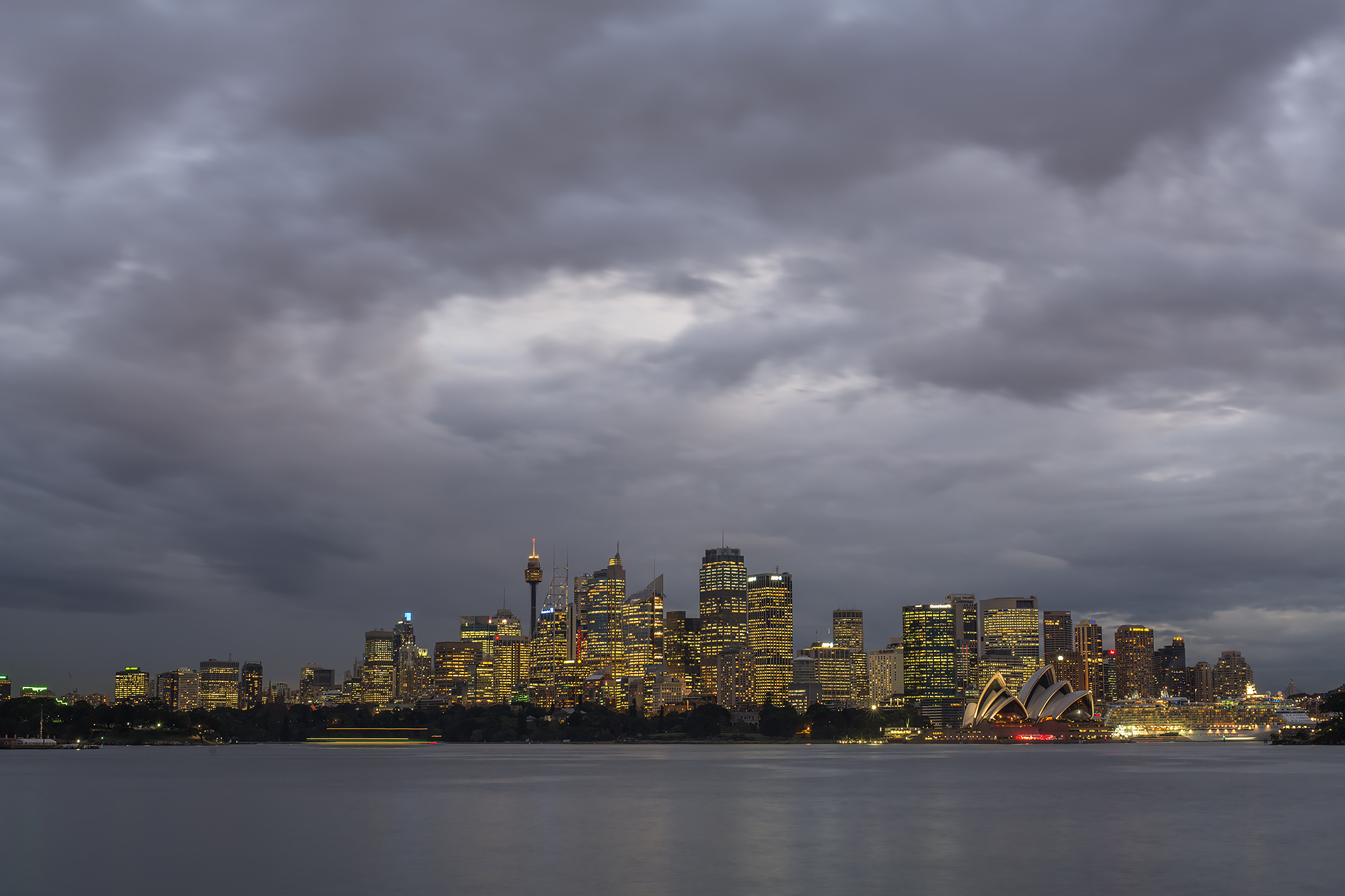
The Sydney central business district skyline viewed from the harbour

Geologically, Port Jackson is a drowned river valley, or ria. It is 19 km long with an area of 55 km^{2}. The estuary's volume at high tide is 562 million cubic metres. The perimeter of the estuary is 317 kilometres.

According to the Geographical Names Board of New South Wales, Port Jackson is "a harbour which comprises all the waters within an imaginary line joining North Head and South Head. Within this harbour lies North Harbour, Middle Harbour and Sydney Harbour."

Port Jackson extends westward from the single entrance known as Sydney Heads (North and South Heads) and encompasses all tidal waters within North Harbour, Middle Harbour, Sydney Harbour, Darling Harbour, Parramatta River and Lane Cove River.

The harbour is heavily embayed. The bays on the south side tend to be wide and rounded, whereas those on the north side are generally narrow inlets. Many of these bays include beaches. The Sydney central business district extends from Circular Quay.

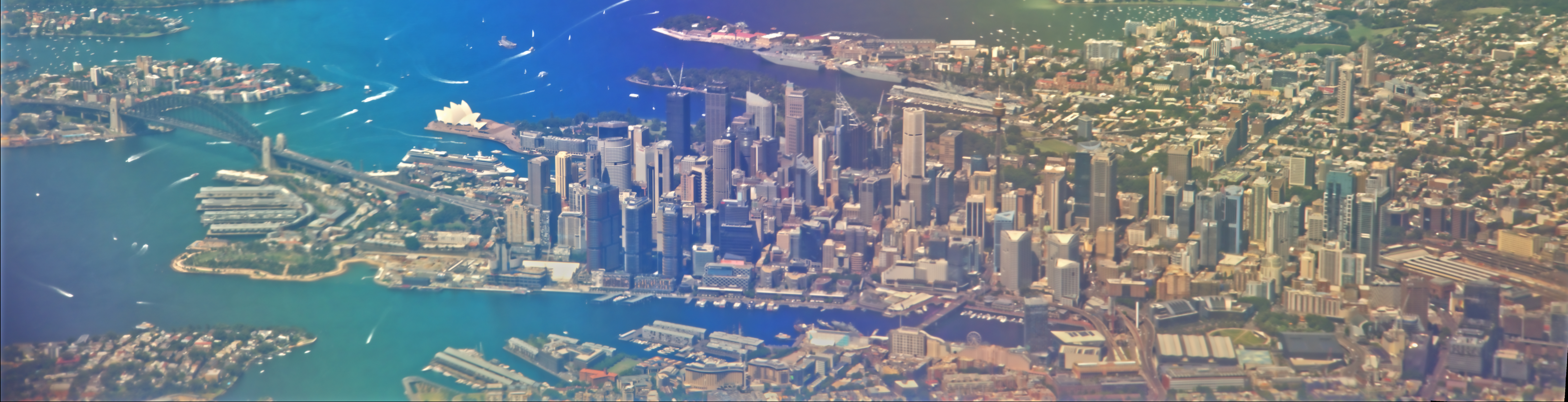
An aerial panorama of Sydney Harbour and Darling Harbour on 4 January 2019

=== Headlands and peninsulas ===
East to west, north side:

- North Head
- Dobroyd Head
- Middle Head
- Georges Head
- Bradleys Head
- Cremorne Point
- Kurraba Point
- Kirribilli
- McMahons Point
- Balls Head
- Berry Island

East to west, south side

- South Head
- Point Piper
- Darling Point
- Potts Point
- Bennelong Point
- Dawes Point
- Millers Point
- Pyrmont
- Balmain

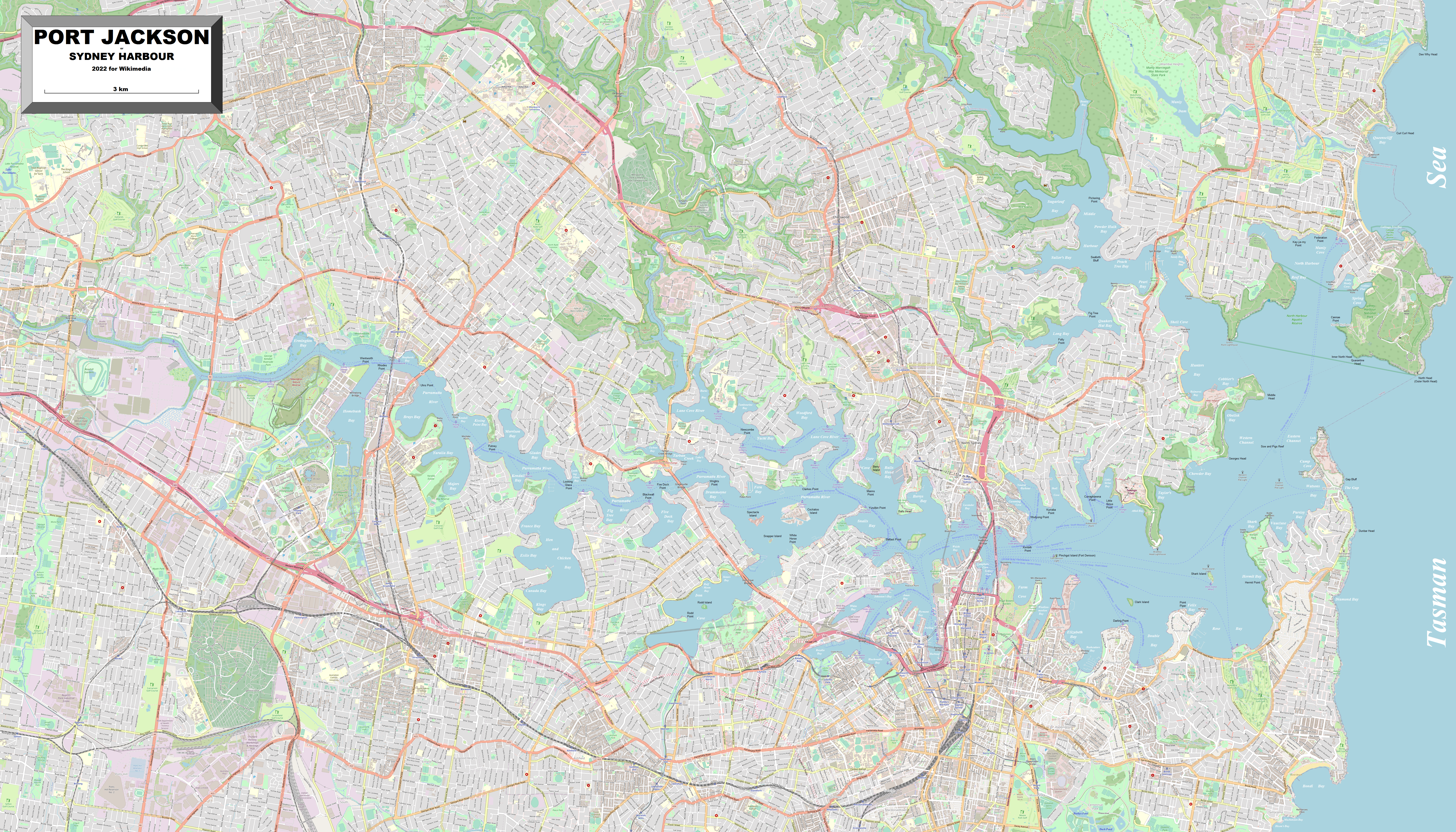
Detailed map of Port Jackson

=== Islands ===
There are several islands within the harbour, including Shark Island, Clark Island, Fort Denison, Goat Island, Cockatoo Island, Spectacle Island, Snapper Island and Rodd Island. Some other former islands, including Garden Island, Glebe Island and Berry Island, have been linked to the shore by land reclamation, though their names often still contain the word "island". Two other former islands, Bennelong Island and Darling Island, are similarly now linked to the mainland, but rarely mentioned as islands. The former Dawes Island was joined to another small island to create Spectacle Island. Exposed at low tide is Sow and Pigs Reef, a well-known navigation obstacle near the main shipping lane.

=== Tributaries and waterways ===
- Tank Stream was a freshwater course emptying into Sydney Cove. Today it is little more than a stormwater drain but originally it was the fresh water supply for the fledgling colony of New South Wales. It originated from a swamp to the west of present-day Hyde Park and at high tide entered Sydney Cove at the intersection of Bridge and Pitt Streets.
- Middle Harbour is the northern arm of Port Jackson. It begins as a small creek (Middle Harbour Creek) at St Ives. It joins the main waterway between two headlands, Middle Head and Grotto Point Reserve, west of Sydney Heads.
- Parramatta River is the western arm of Port Jackson. The river begins at the confluence of Toongabbie Creek and Darling Mills Creek west of Parramatta and joins the main waterway between Greenwich Point, Greenwich, and Robinsons Point, Birchgrove.
- Lane Cove River rises near Thornleigh and flows generally south for about 15 kilometres (9.3 mi). Its catchment area is approximately 95.4 square kilometres (36.8 sq mi).
- Tarban Creek, a northern tributary of the Parramatta River, enters Port Jackson at Hunters Hill.
- Johnstons Creek rises in Stanmore and flows in a generally northward direction, passing through the inner-western suburbs of Forest Lodge, Annandale and Glebe. The creek passes beneath the stands of the now demolished Harold Park Paceway prior to emptying into Rozelle Bay at Bicentennial Park, Glebe. Orphan School Creek is a tributary.
- Duck River is a perennial stream and southern tributary of the Parramatta River.

=== Climate ===
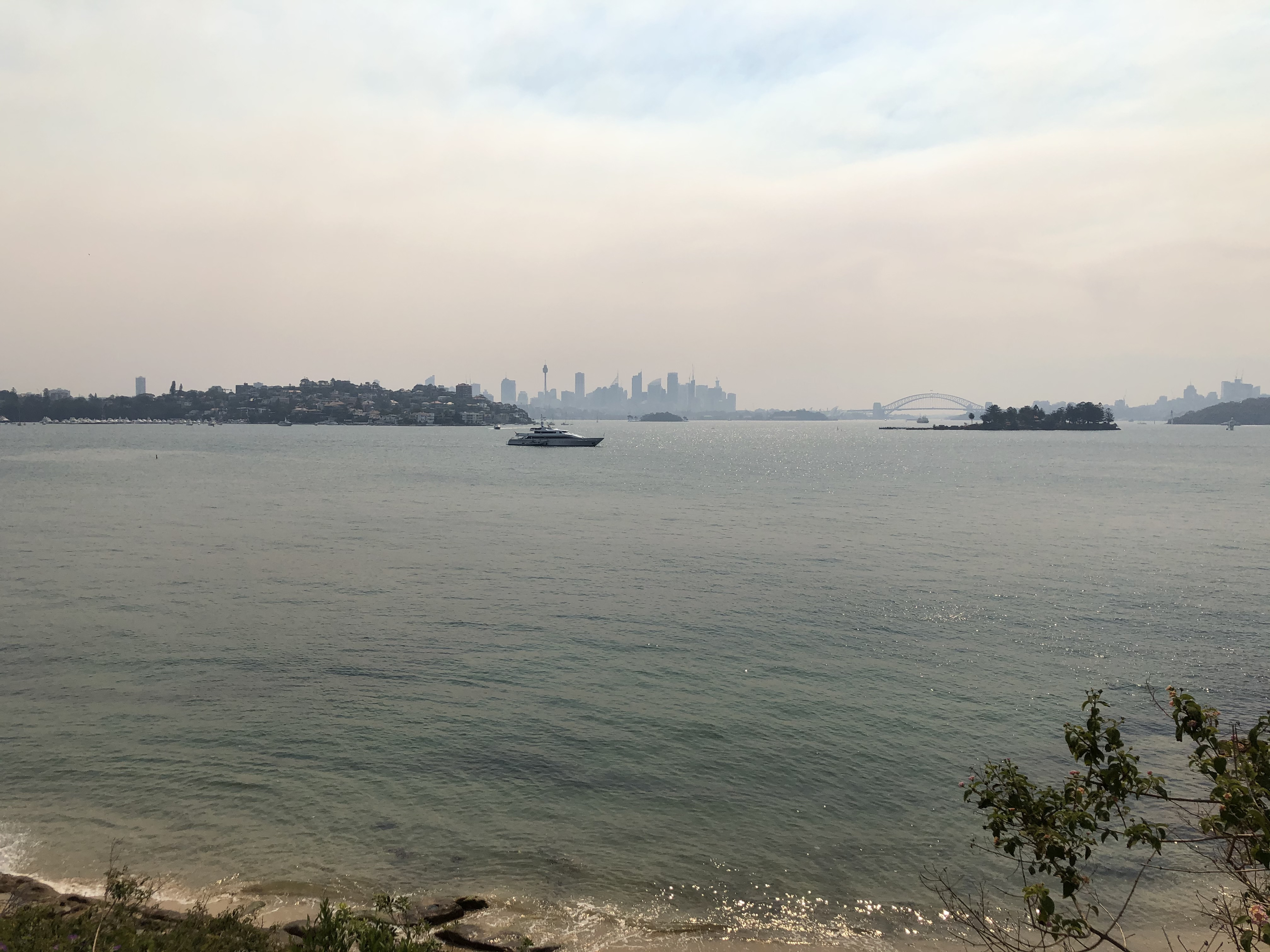
Port Jackson shrouded in bushfire smoke during Black Summer

Port Jackson has a humid subtropical climate (Köppen: Cfa) with warm, somewhat humid summers and mild to cool winters, with moderate rainfall spread throughout the year. Due to its exposed proximity to the Tasman Sea, it is slightly cooler, wetter and windier than Observatory Hill to the west. In addition to featuring the lowest maximum summer temperatures in the Sydney region (averaging just 24.4 °C (75.9 °F)), Port Jackson is also least affected by extreme heat due to frequent sea breezes. Conversely, winter nights are among the warmest in Sydney, and rarely dip below 8.0 °C (46.4 °F), although fog often occurs and may be disruptive.

Port Jackson's weather station is located within a lighthouse just south of Georges Head at Georges Heights in Mosman and is adjacent to the suburbs of Vaucluse, Point Piper and Watsons Bay, which are on Port Jackson's east side towards the Pacific Ocean. Sydney Cove, a bay in Port Jackson's west side that includes Circular Quay, is more proximate to the Observatory Hill weather station, and therefore the climate data below does not apply to that vicinity.

Climate data for Sydney Harbour (Western Channel Pile Light)
Month	Jan	Feb	Mar	Apr	May	Jun	Jul	Aug	Sep	Oct	Nov	Dec	Year
Record high °C (°F)	42.2 (108.0)	39.4 (102.9)	38.2 (100.8)	32.4 (90.3)	27.0 (80.6)	24.1 (75.4)	25.2 (77.4)	28.7 (83.7)	34.1 (93.4)	35.8 (96.4)	40.8 (105.4)	38.5 (101.3)	42.2 (108.0)
Mean daily maximum °C (°F)	24.8 (76.6)	24.8 (76.6)	23.9 (75.0)	22.4 (72.3)	20.0 (68.0)	17.8 (64.0)	17.3 (63.1)	17.9 (64.2)	19.8 (67.6)	21.2 (70.2)	22.2 (72.0)	23.6 (74.5)	21.3 (70.3)
Daily mean °C (°F)	22.6 (72.7)	22.7 (72.9)	21.6 (70.9)	19.6 (67.3)	16.8 (62.2)	14.7 (58.5)	13.9 (57.0)	14.5 (58.1)	16.6 (61.9)	18.3 (64.9)	19.7 (67.5)	21.3 (70.3)	18.5 (65.3)
Mean daily minimum °C (°F)	20.4 (68.7)	20.6 (69.1)	19.3 (66.7)	16.8 (62.2)	13.5 (56.3)	11.6 (52.9)	10.5 (50.9)	11.1 (52.0)	13.4 (56.1)	15.4 (59.7)	17.2 (63.0)	18.9 (66.0)	15.7 (60.3)
Record low °C (°F)	14.8 (58.6)	14.7 (58.5)	13.2 (55.8)	10.7 (51.3)	8.9 (48.0)	5.0 (41.0)	6.1 (43.0)	6.2 (43.2)	7.0 (44.6)	8.8 (47.8)	11.0 (51.8)	12.1 (53.8)	5.0 (41.0)
Average precipitation mm (inches)	97.6 (3.84)	120.6 (4.75)	120.7 (4.75)	136.4 (5.37)	122.5 (4.82)	138.4 (5.45)	96.1 (3.78)	81.3 (3.20)	70.9 (2.79)	73.7 (2.90)	89.2 (3.51)	78.4 (3.09)	1,215.8 (47.87)
Average precipitation days (≥ 1 mm)	8.3	8.4	9.3	10.1	9.1	9.4	7.5	8.1	7.9	8.5	8.4	8.2	103.2
Source 1: Bureau of Meteorology (temperatures, 1996–present)
Source 2: Bureau of Meteorology, Rose Bay (rainfall, 1928–present) Manly Town Hall (rain days, 1914–1963)

== Infrastructure ==
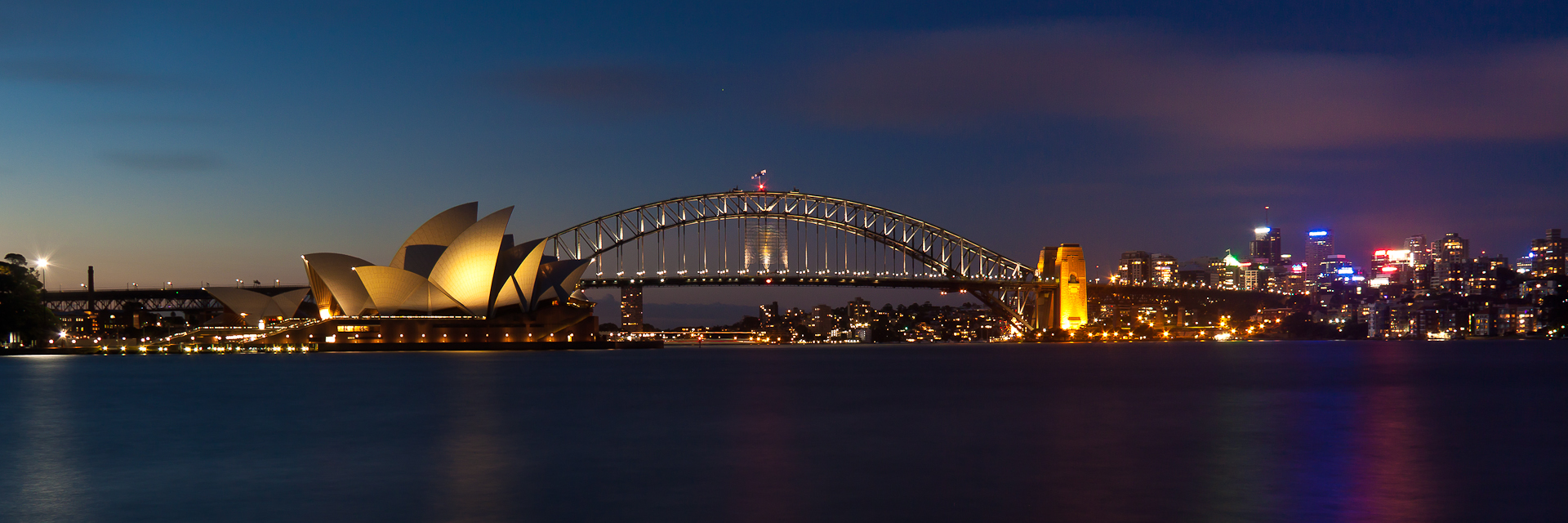
Sydney Harbour at night, with the Opera House and Harbour Bridge

=== Bridges ===
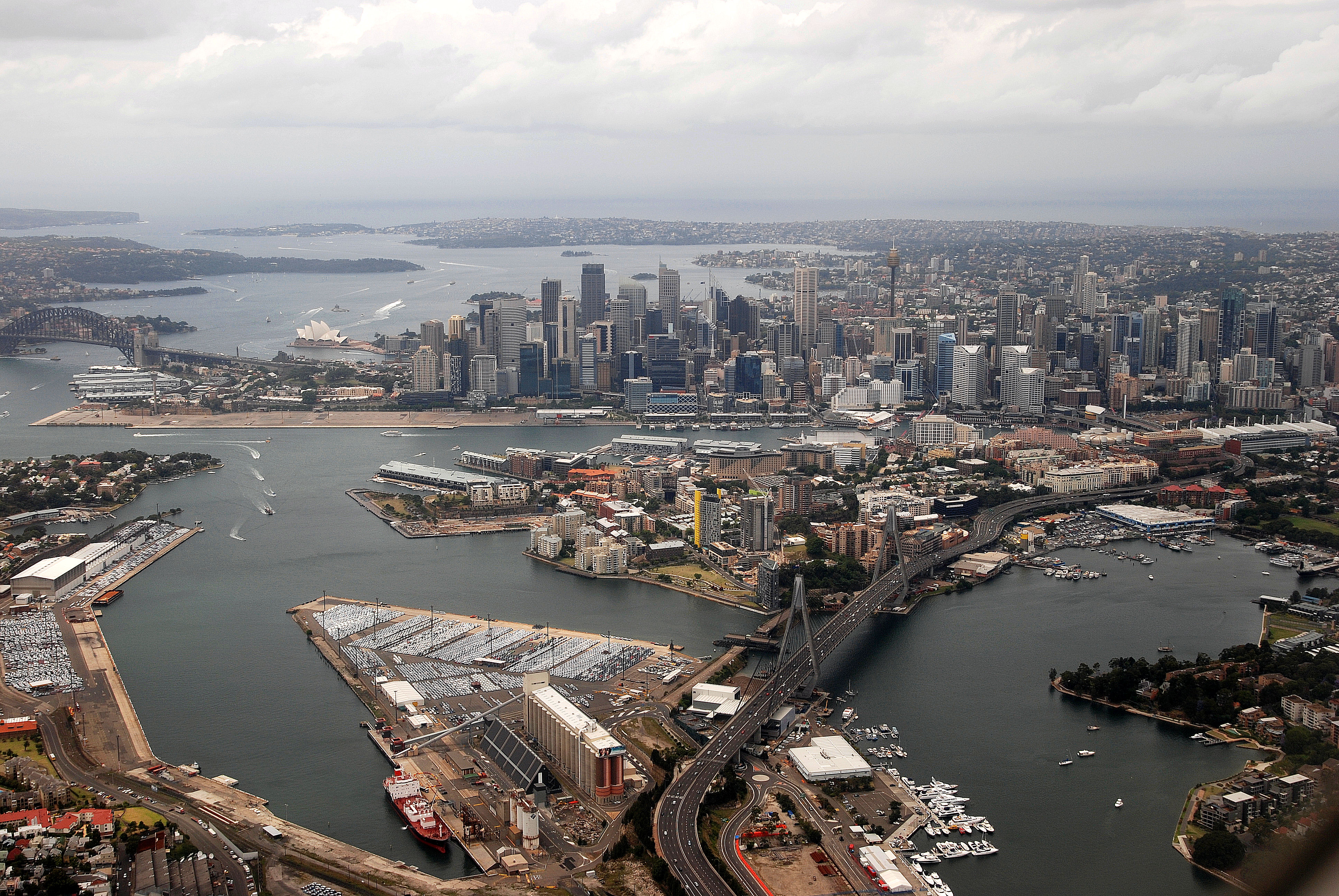
The Anzac Bridge is on the righthand side with Glebe Island and White Bay on the lefthand side. Sydney Harbour Bridge and the CBD is in the background.

Port Jackson is bridged from north to south by the Sydney Harbour Bridge, the Gladesville Bridge, the Ryde Bridge, and the Silverwater Bridge.

Other bridges spanning Port Jackson waterways are Pyrmont Bridge spanning Darling Harbour; the Anzac Bridge (formerly known as the Glebe Island Bridge), spanning Blackwattle Bay; the Iron Cove Bridge spanning Iron Cove; the Spit Bridge spanning Middle Harbour; the Roseville Bridge spanning Middle Harbour; the Tarban Creek Bridge spanning Tarban Creek.

The original Meadowbank Railway Bridge carried the Main Northern railway line, now reduced to pedestrian traffic only. The replacement John Whitton Bridge carries two railway tracks with piers suitable for four tracks.

There is a double track light rail bridge on the Parramatta Light Rail crossing the Parramatta River near Camellia.

Bennelong Bridge over Homebush Bay connects Wentworth Point and Rhodes.

=== Punts ===
- Mortlake Ferry

=== Weir ===
A weir between Queens Avenue and Charles Street, Parramatta, called Charles Street Weir, separates the saltwater and tidal waters to the east from the freshwater and non-tidal waters to the west. The weir is marked right near the western (left) edge of the detailed map above.

=== Tunnels ===
A road tunnel, the Sydney Harbour Tunnel passing underneath the Harbour to the east of the bridge was opened in August 1992.

In 2005, 2010 and in 2014, the NSW Government proposed a rail tunnel be constructed to the west of the Sydney Harbour Bridge. Construction of a pair of rail tunnels to the west of the Sydney Harbour Bridge, as part of the Sydney Metro project, was approved in January 2017 while the Harbour tunnelling was completed in March 2020. The line opened on 19 August 2024.

The Western Harbour Tunnel is planned to offer another motor vehicle tunnel in 2026.

=== Cruise ship terminals ===
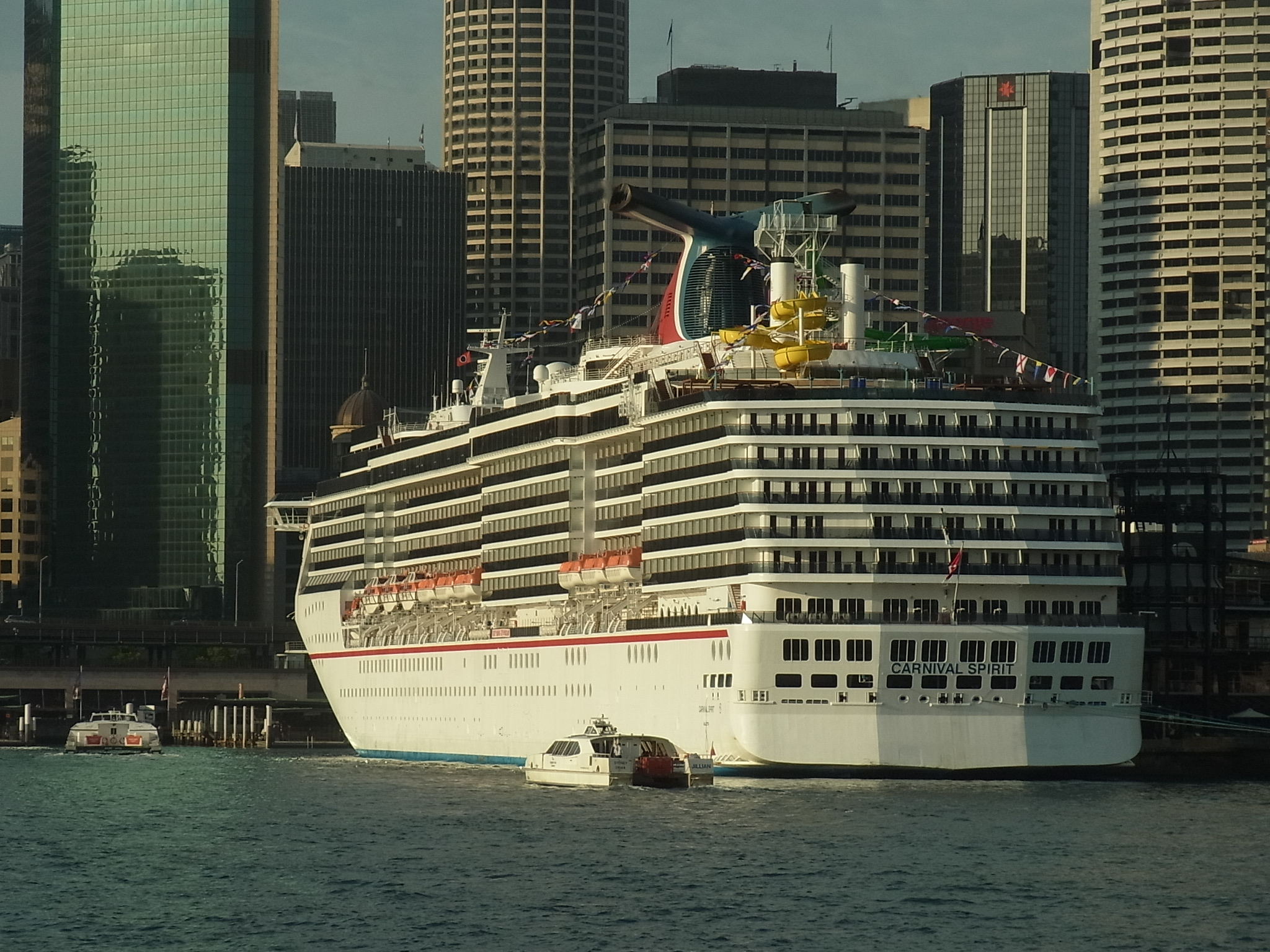
Carnival Spirit cruise ship in Sydney Cove in 2013

Permanent cruise ship terminals are located at the Overseas Passenger Terminal at Circular Quay, Sydney Cove and at the White Bay Cruise Terminal at White Bay. White Bay's evolution to a cruise terminal came with the closure of Darling Harbour terminal to make way for the Barangaroo development.

=== Other port facilities ===
White Bay and adjacent Glebe Island have been working ports since the mid-1800s, handling just about everything from timber and paper, coal, sugar and cement to cars and containers. The NSW Government identified both as vital to the City's economy and in March 2013 announced its commitment to maintaining both as working ports as it frees up neighbouring bays for public access. Glebe Island is Sydney's last remaining deepwater port able to supply the City's ongoing demand for dry bulk goods such as sugar, gypsum and cement.

Most of Sydney's port infrastructure has moved south to Botany Bay since the construction of the first container terminals there in the late 1960s and early 1970s.

=== Military installations ===
Former:

- Dawes Point Battery (1791)
- Fort Macquarie (1798)
- Middle Head Fortifications (1801)
- Fort Phillip (1804)
- Goat Island (1826)
- Bradleys Head Fortification Complex (1840)
- Admiralty House (1856)
- Fort Denison (1857)
- Georges Head Battery (1871)
- Steel Point Battery (1874)
- North Fort (1936)
- Sydney Harbour anti-submarine boom net (1942)
- HMAS Platypus (1967)

Current:

- HMAS Kuttabul
- HMAS Penguin
- HMAS Waterhen
- HMAS Watson

== Maritime transport ==
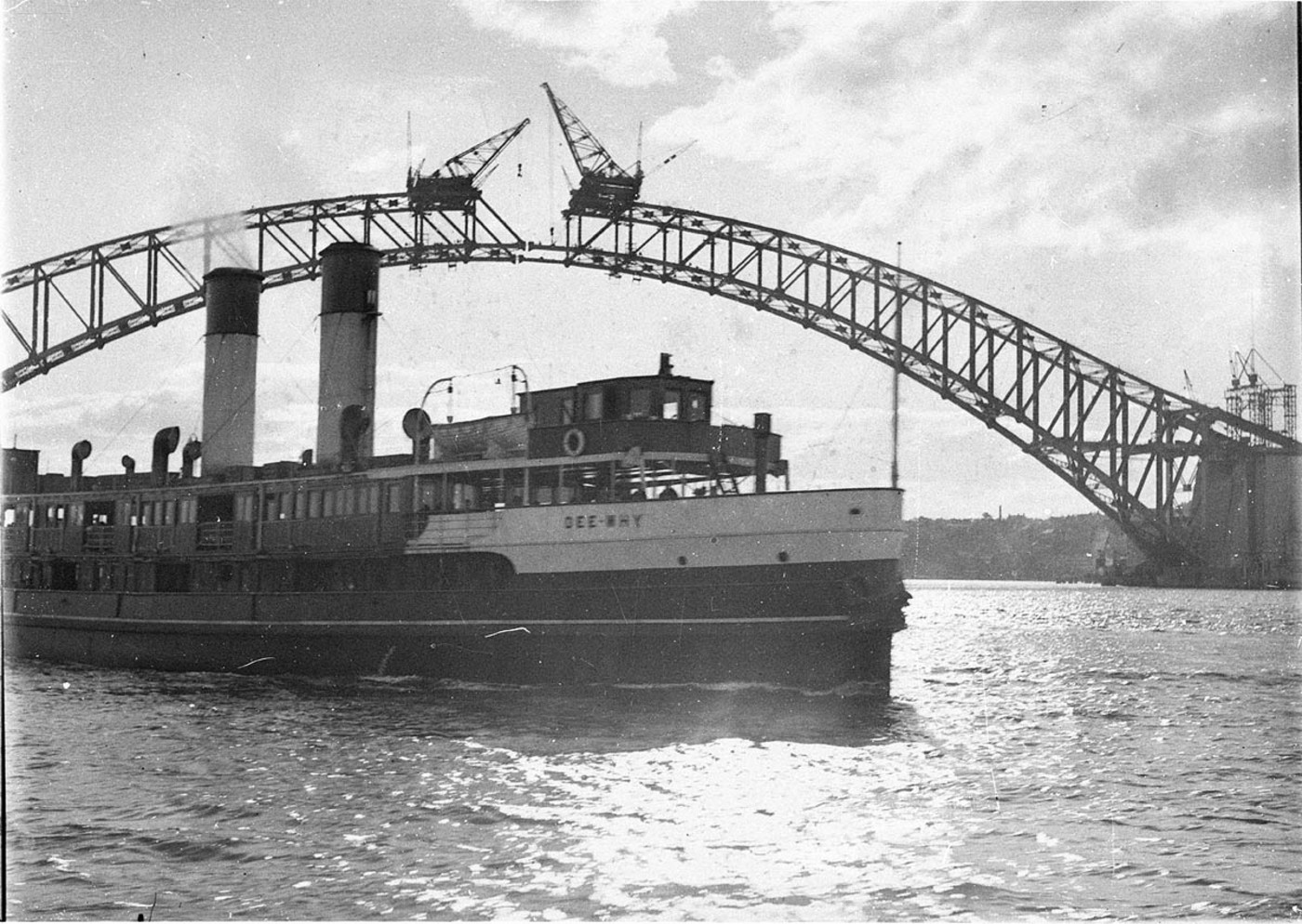
SS Dee Why in 1930

Sydney Ferries operate services from Circular Quay to Cockatoo Island, Double Bay, Manly, Mosman, Neutral Bay, Parramatta, Pyrmont Bay, Taronga Zoo and Watsons Bay.

Water taxi and water limousine operators offer transport not restricted by timetables or specific routes, and can also provide a service to or from private wharfs and houses on the waterfront. Sightseeing harbour cruises are operated daily from Circular Quay. Whale watching excursions are also operated from Port Jackson.

The Mortlake Ferry, also known as the Putney Punt, crosses the Parramatta River, connecting Mortlake and Putney.

== Maritime heritage ==
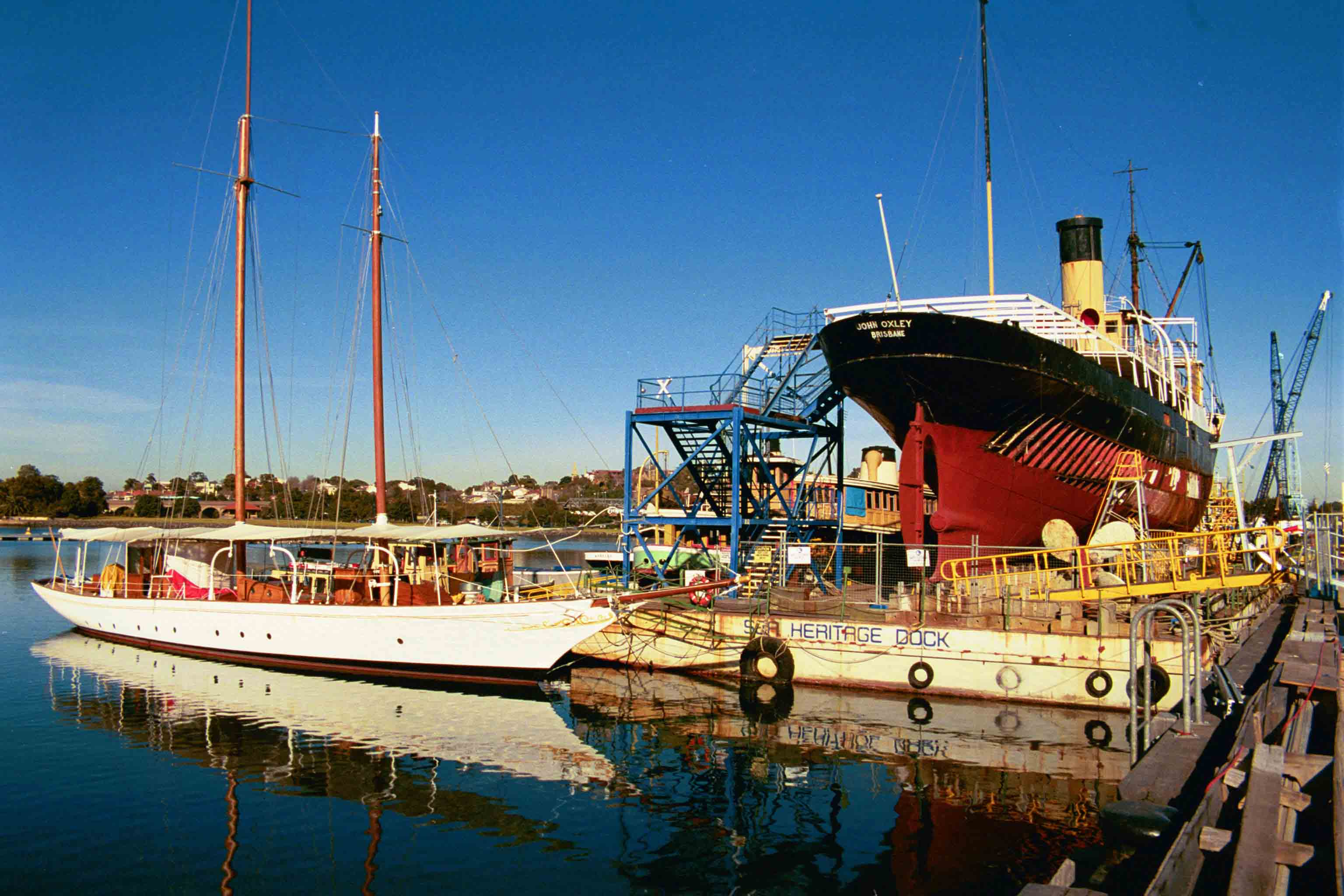
Sydney Heritage Fleet, Rozelle Bay

Australian National Maritime Museum, at Darling Harbour, has themed exhibitions ranging from Indigenous lore and European seafaring to aquatic sport and maritime defence.

Sydney Heritage Fleet is a largely volunteer organisation dedicated to the restoration and operation of heritage vessels. The barque James Craig of the SHF sails regularly from Port Jackson.

RAN Heritage Centre at Garden Island has many exhibits, artefacts and documents relating to the history of the Royal Australian Navy.

Port Jackson is associated with the voyages of Richard Siddins.

== Ecology ==
The Sydney Institute of Marine Science (SIMS) has done a great deal of work focused on habitat restoration and restoring the biodiversity of the harbour, including a major program called the Sydney Harbour Research Program around 2012, led by Emma Johnston. Project Restore is an ongoing large-scale project by SIMS and its partner universities that aims to restore different habitat types at the same time, to restore seascapes in Sydney Harbour. It encompasses four projects already under way, including the "Living Seawalls" project, which entails covering parts of the harbour seawalls with specially designed tiles that mimic natural microhabitats – with crevices and other features that more closely resemble natural rocks. Project Restore is partly funded by the NSW Government.

== Heritage listings ==
Port Jackson has a number of heritage-listed sites, including:

- Fort Denison
- Goat Island
- SS South Steyne
- Bradleys Head: Bradleys Head Light Tower

== Derivative unit of measure ==
A Sydharb is a unit of volume used in Australia for water, especially in dams and harbours. One sydharb (or sydarb), also called a Sydney Harbour, is the amount of water in the Sydney Harbour (Port Jackson): approximately 500 gigalitres (410,000 acre⋅ft).

== Image gallery ==
1890 nautical chart of Port Jackson

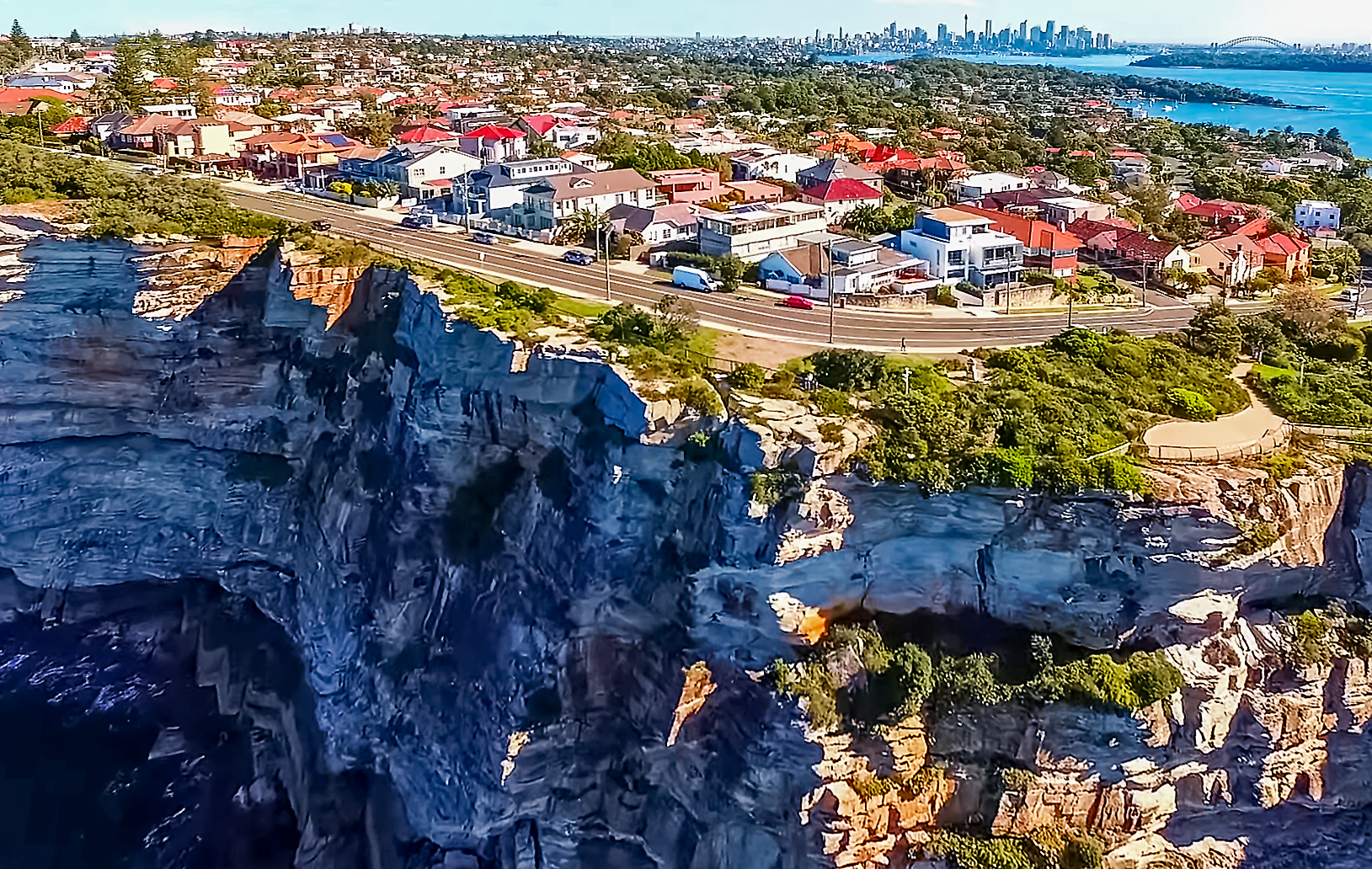
Sydney Harbour in distance as seen aloft from Tasman Sea, overlooking the clifftop suburb of Vaucluse

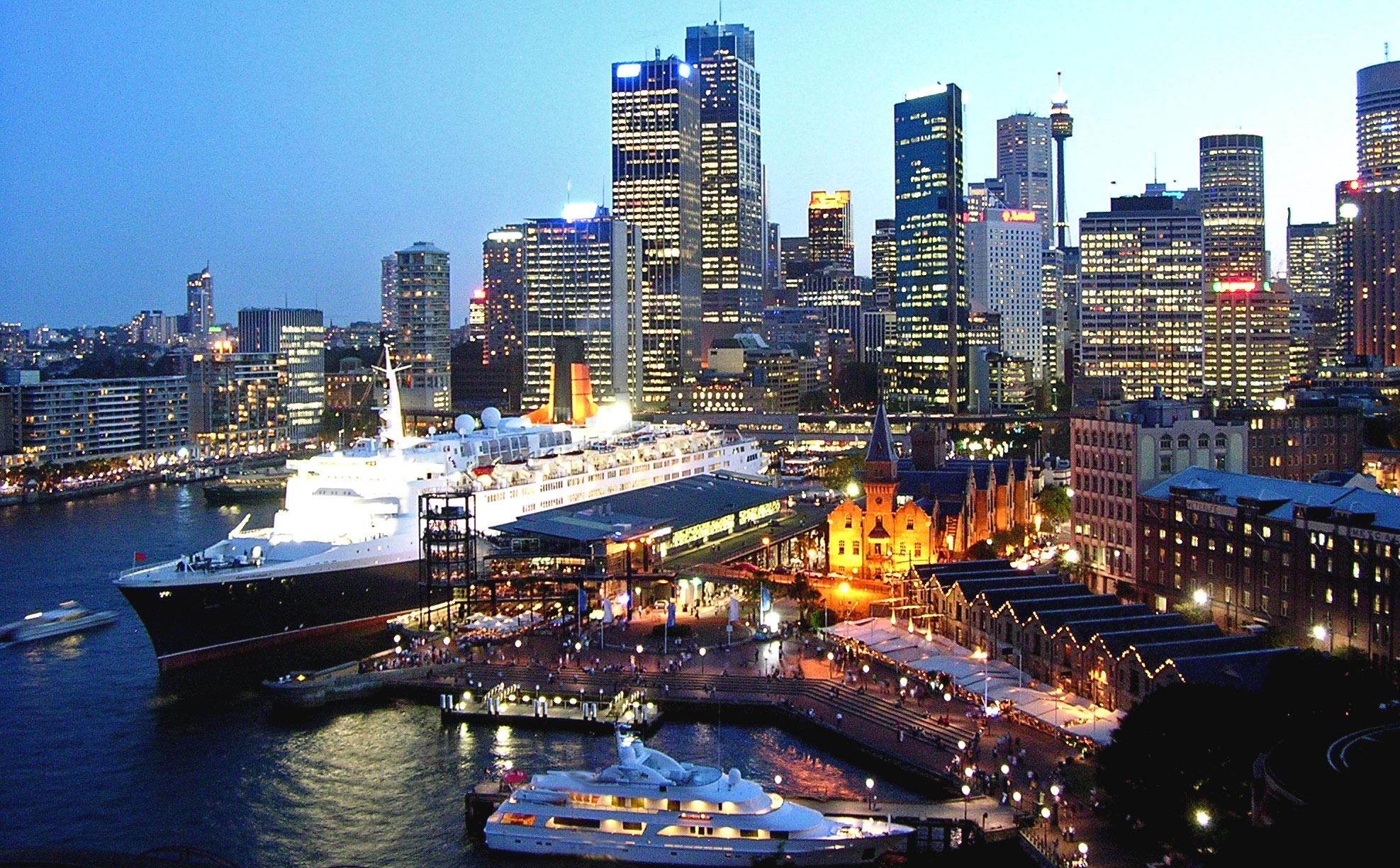
The Queen Elizabeth 2 docked at Sydney Harbour, looking towards Circular Quay and the Sydney CBD

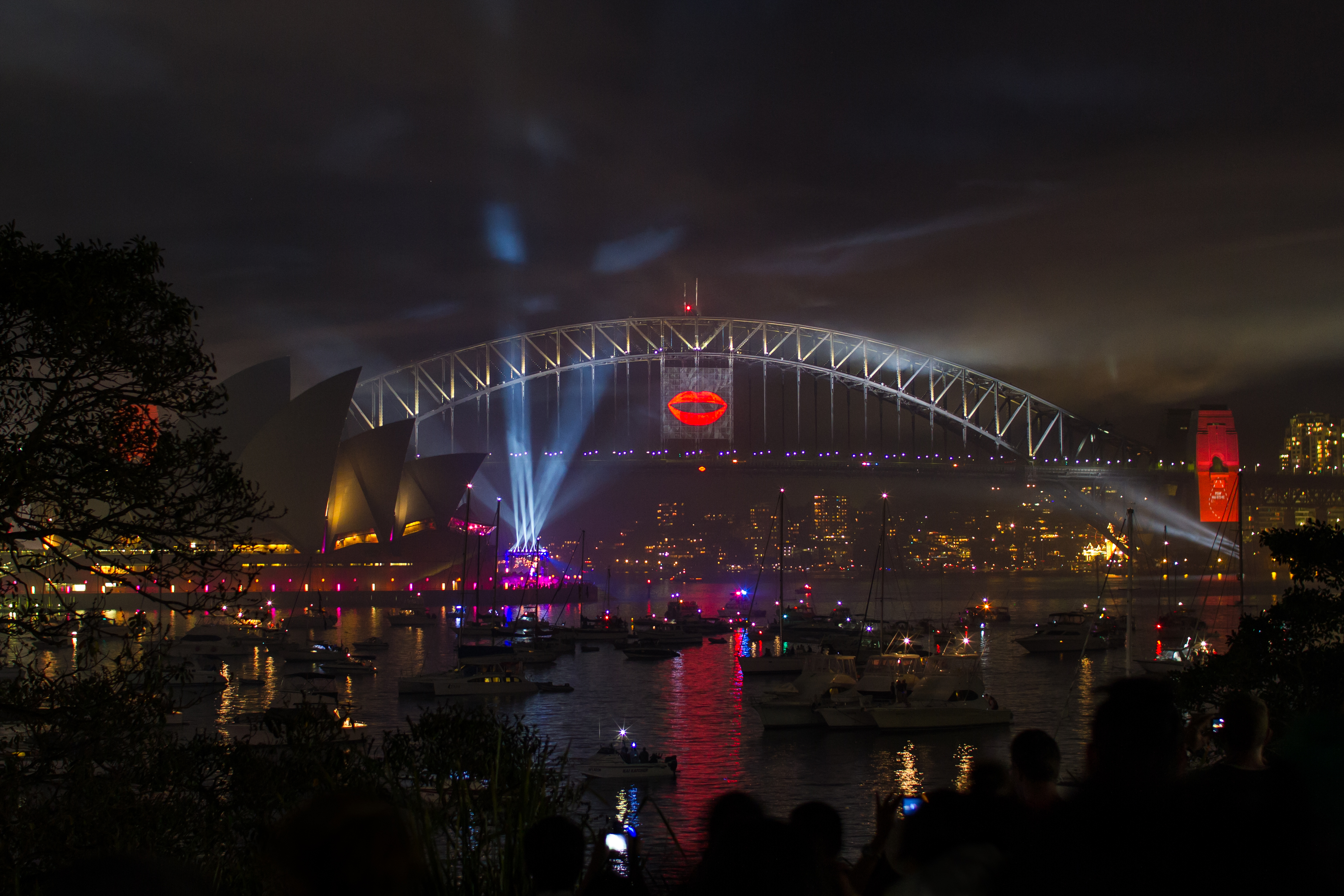
Sydney Harbour on New Year's Eve

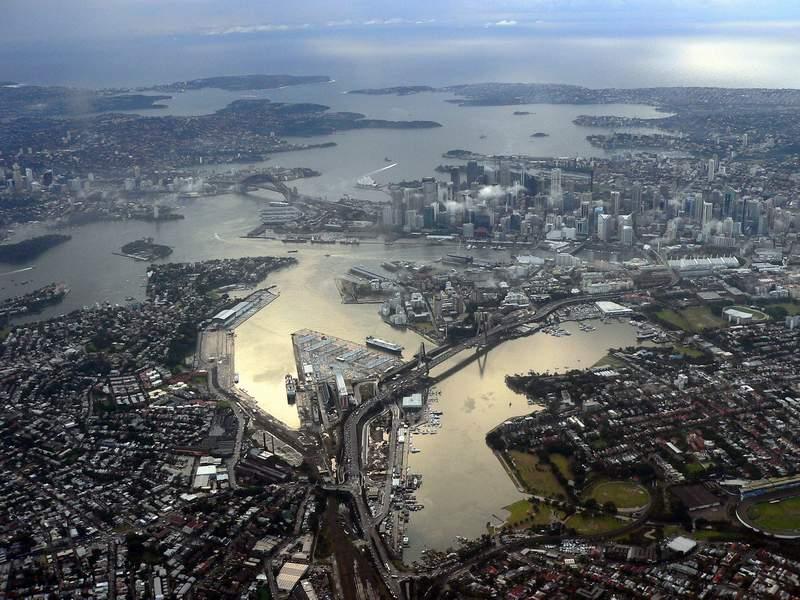
View of Port Jackson and Sydney's CBD

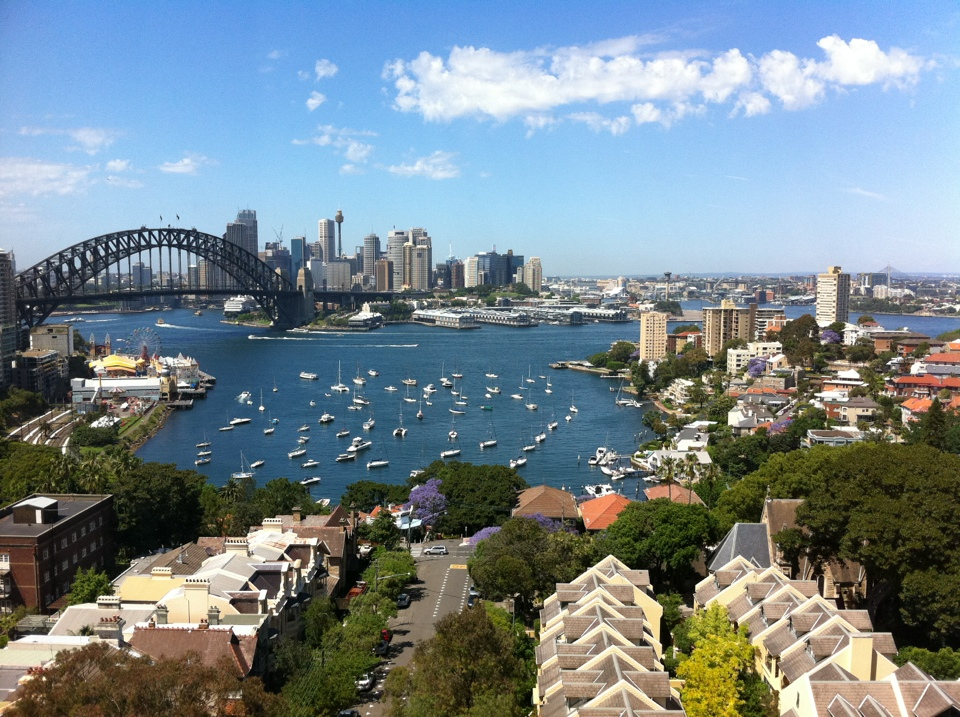
Sydney Harbour

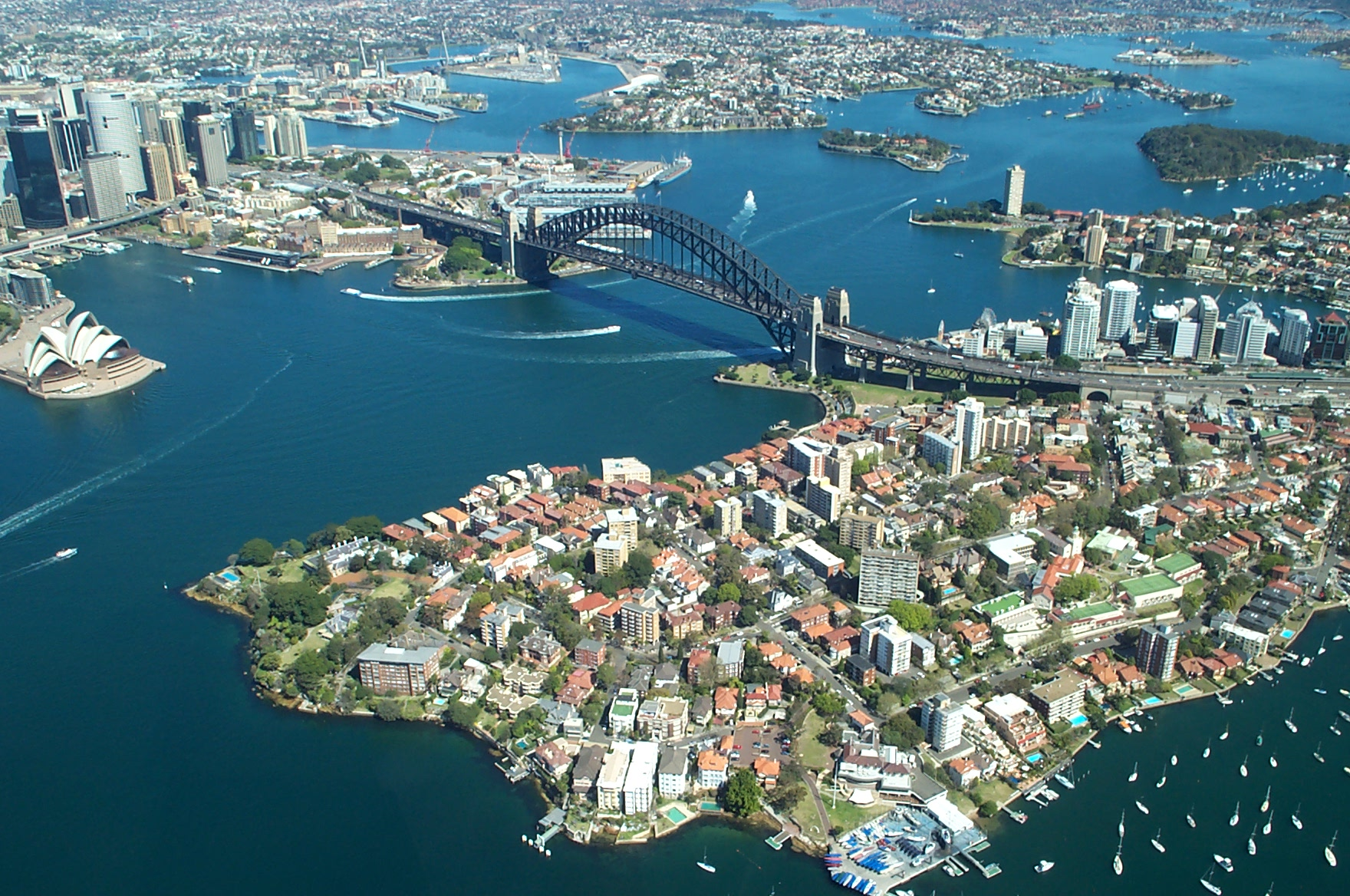
Sydney Harbour and Port Jackson displaying aerial views of the Sydney Harbour Bridge and the Sydney Opera House. The CBD is located to the far left of the photo.

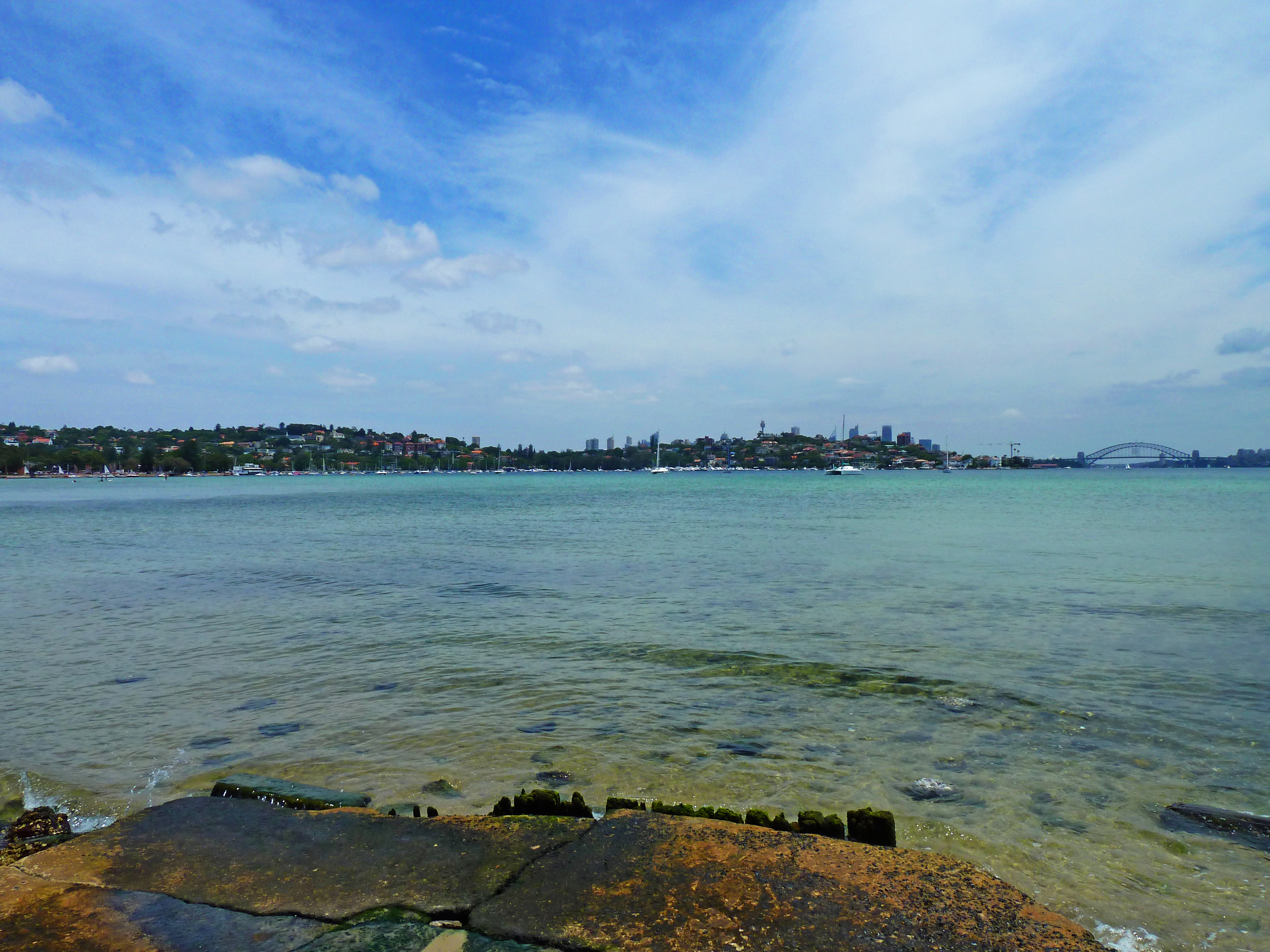
Port Jackson, as seen from Rose Bay

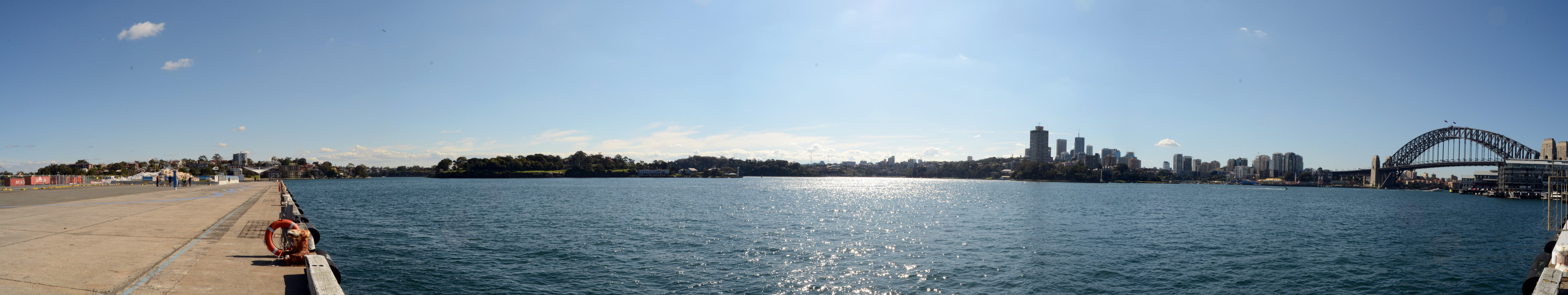
Sydney Harbour from Millers Point

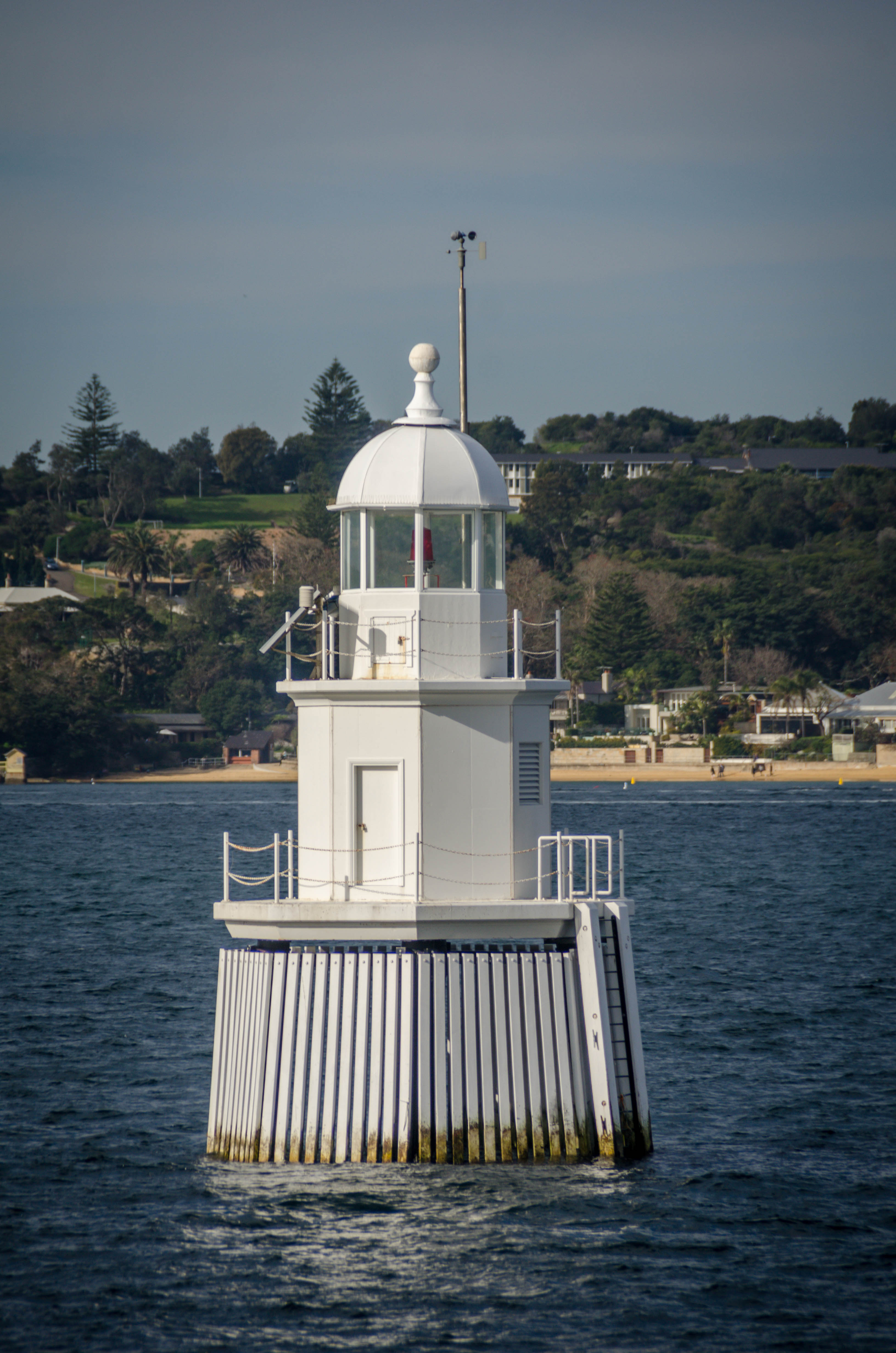
East Channel Marker in Sydney Harbour, colloquially called the East Wedding Cake

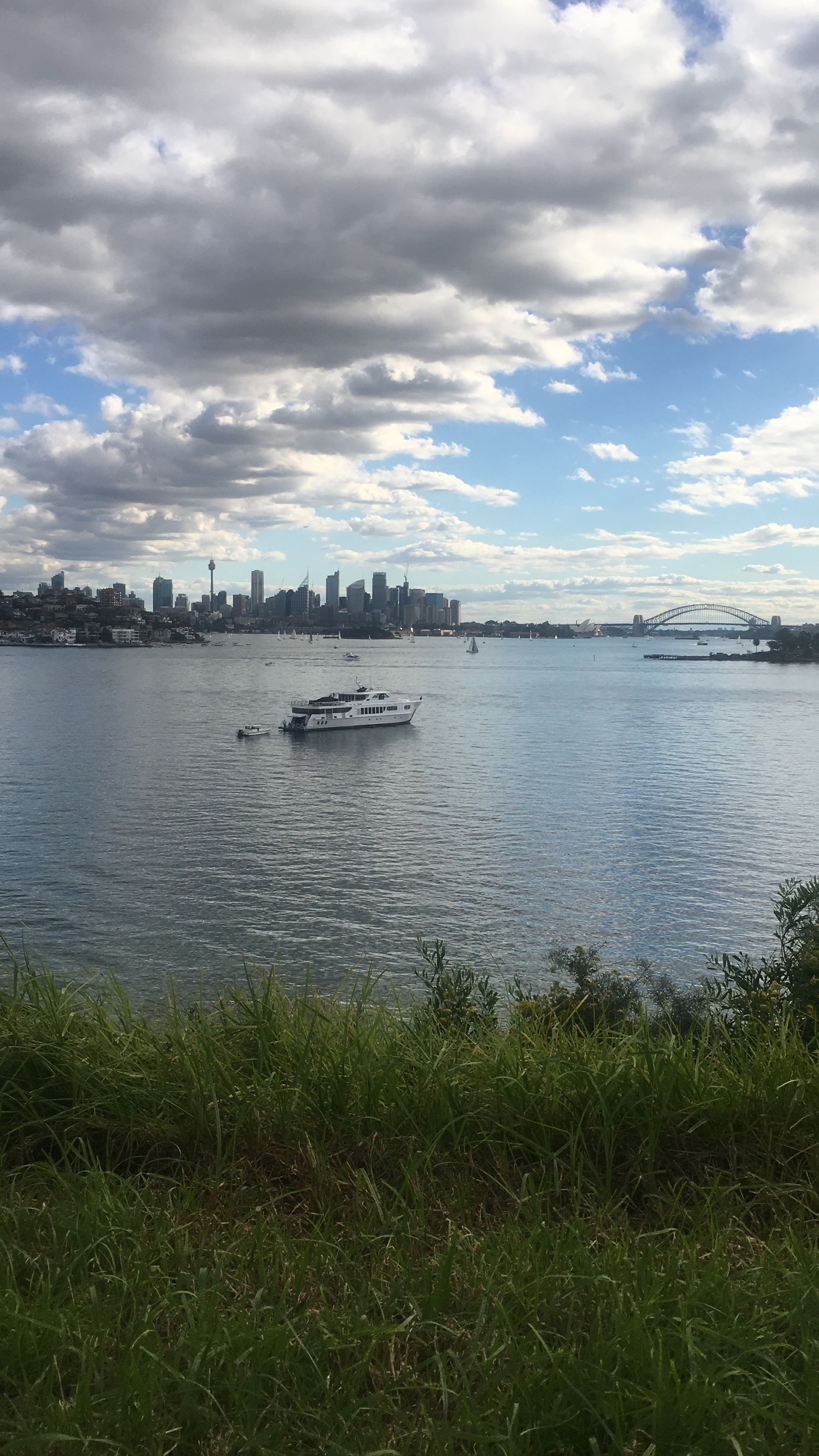
View of the harbour and the Sydney Harbour Bridge from Vaucluse

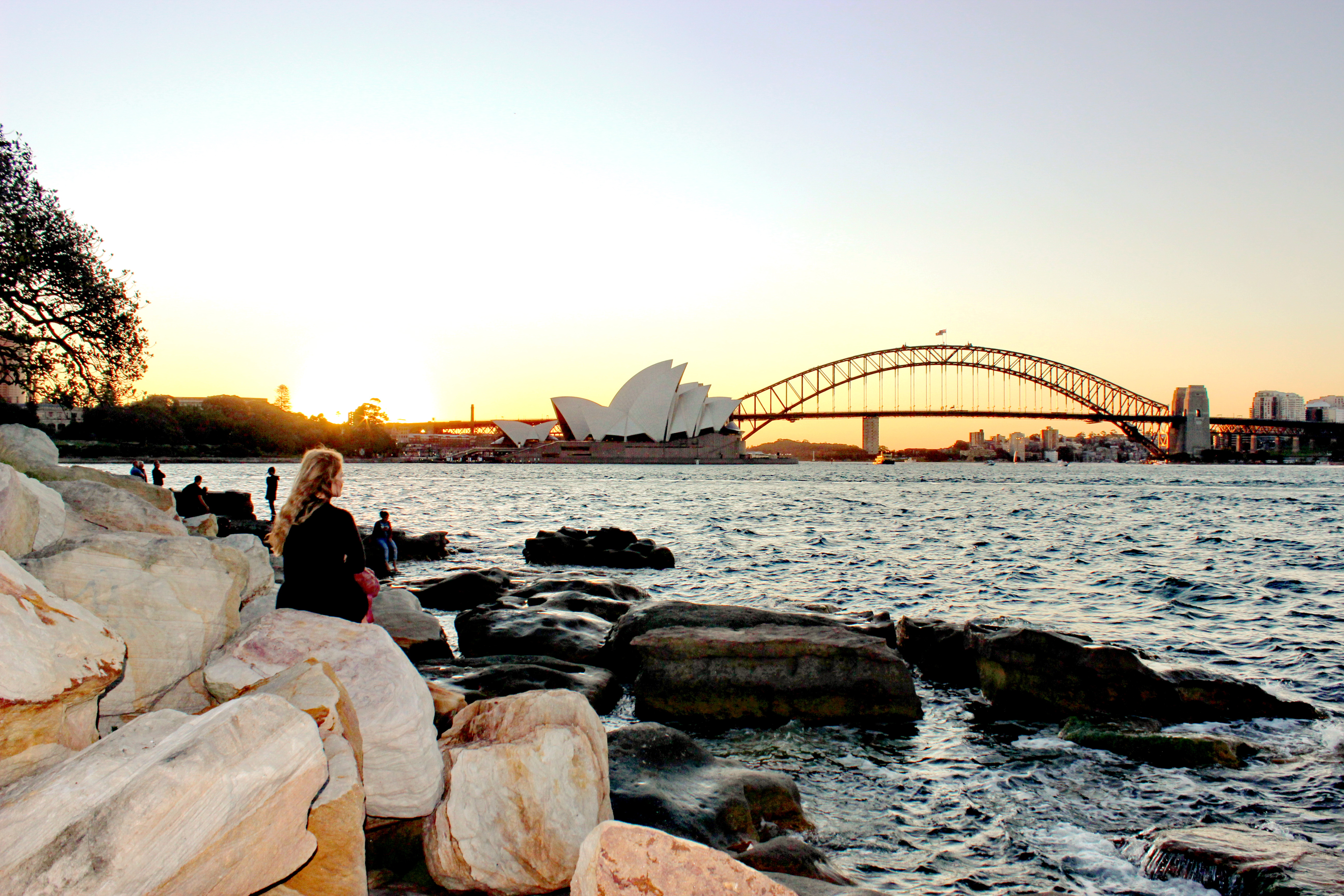
View of the harbour from the sandstone rocks in Mrs Macquarie's Chair

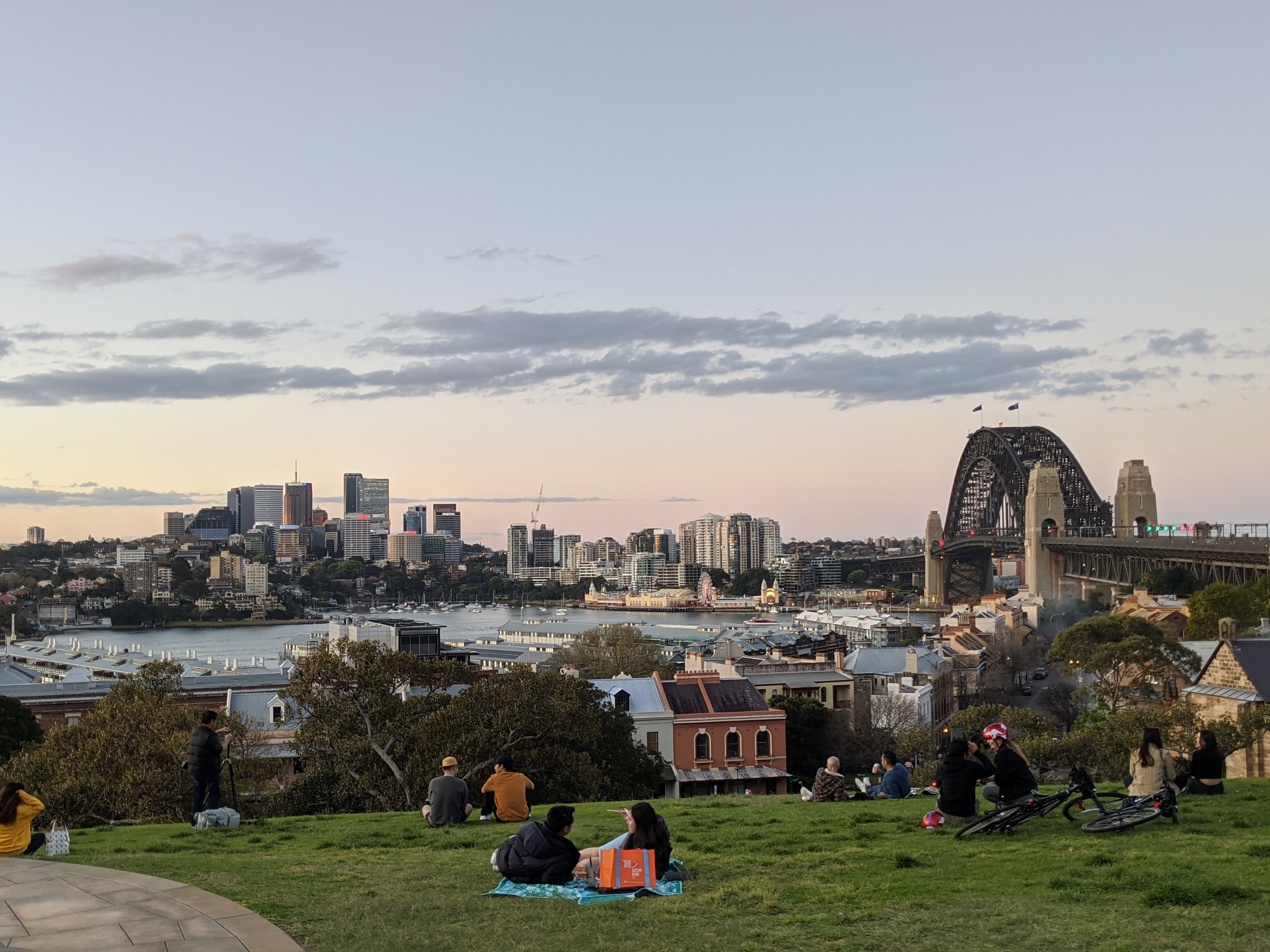
View over the Harbour from Observatory Park

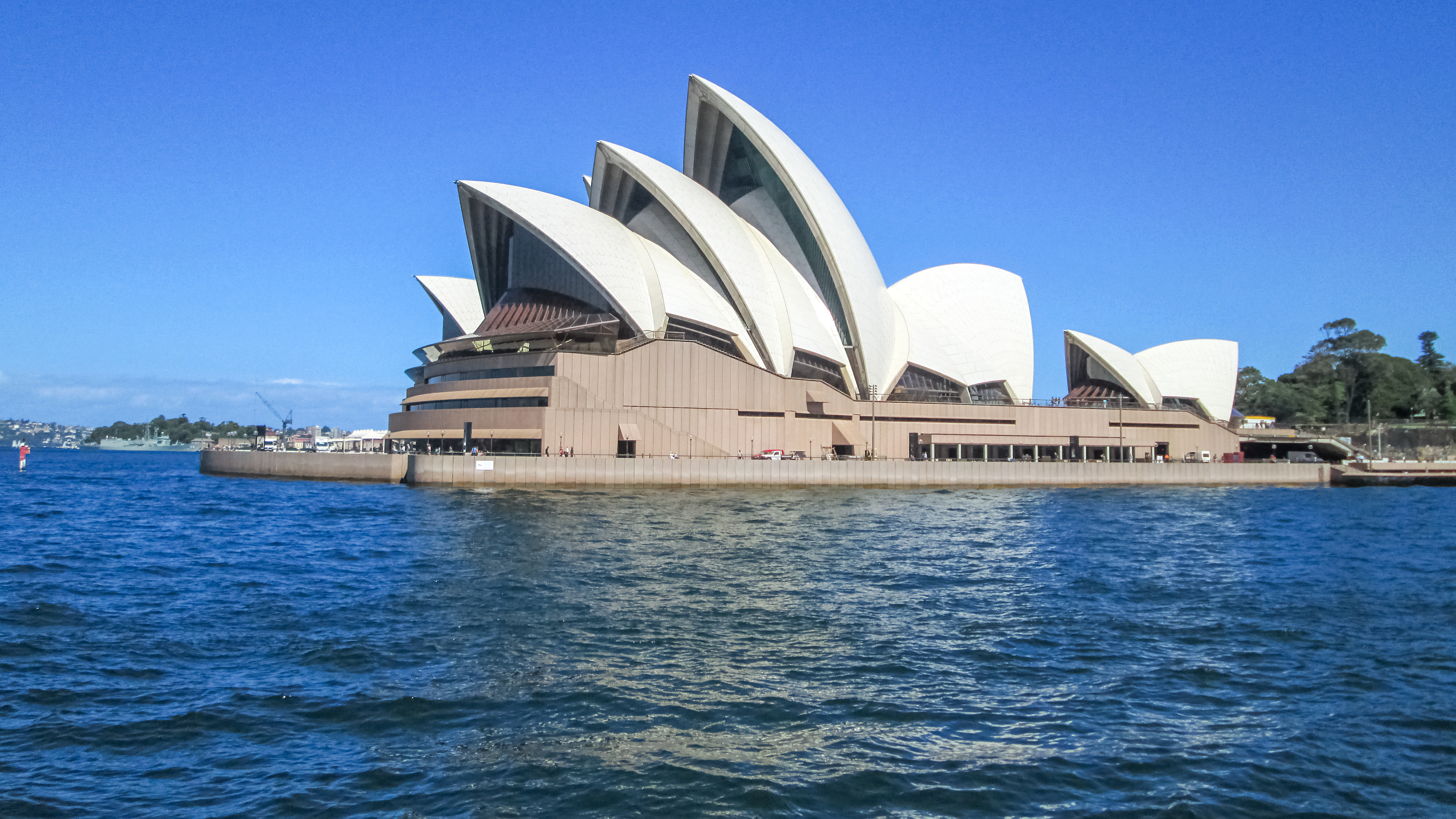
Opera house in 2013

== See also ==
- List of bridges in Sydney
- List of foreshore industrial sites on Sydney Harbour
- Geography of Sydney
- Naval Base Sydney
- List of deepest natural harbours
