= Sow and Pigs Reef =

Reef in Australia

Coordinates: 33°50′12″S 151°16′14″E

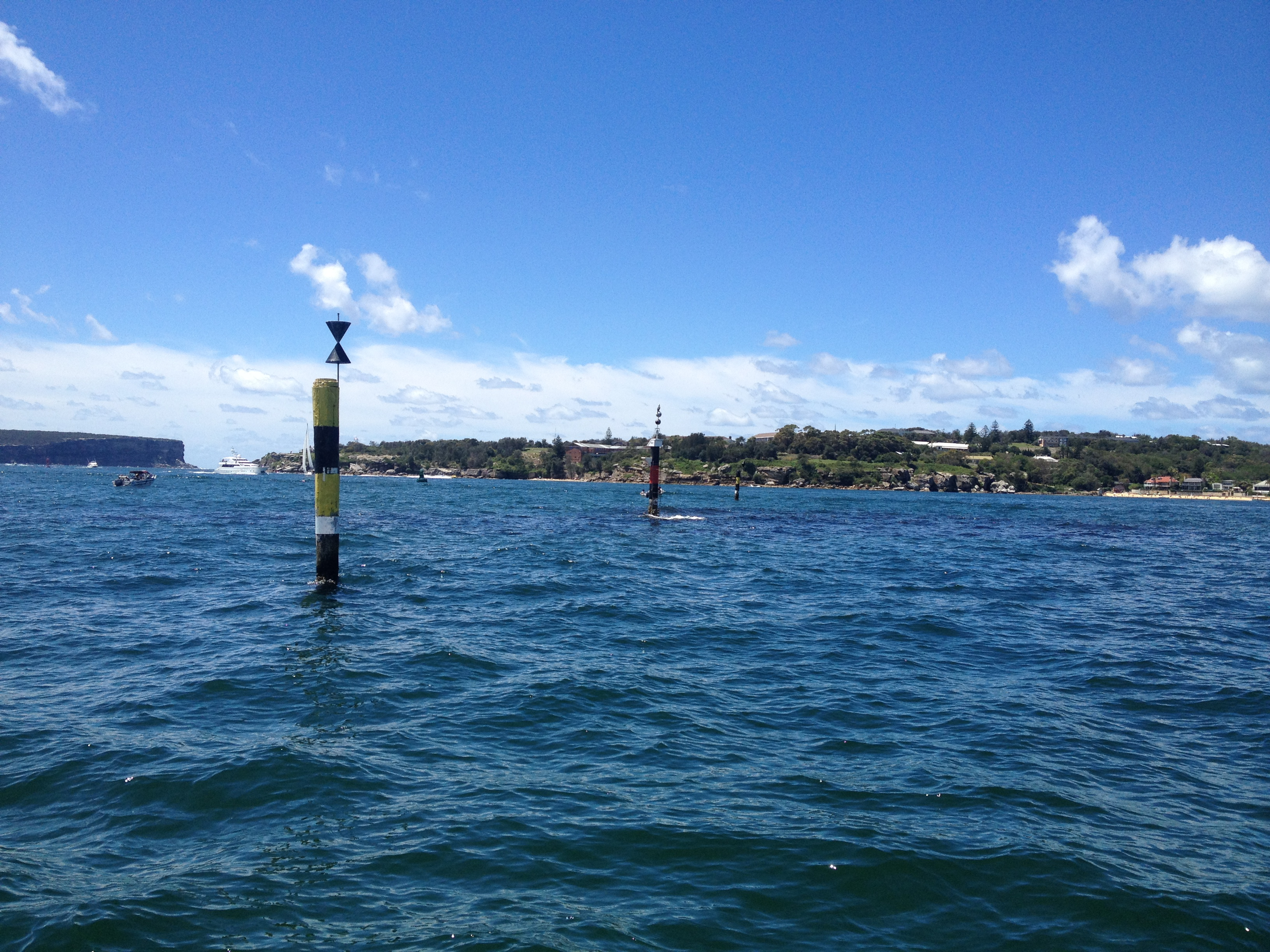
The submerged reef with cardinal marks and danger mark.

Sow and Pigs Reef is a rocky reef in Sydney Harbour, New South Wales, Australia. The reef is situated on the eastern side of the main shipping channel between Middle Head and South Head. It is 150 metres (490 ft) long and up to 70 metres (230 ft) wide. Originally the reef was exposed and resembled a sow and her litter. Explosives were used to reduce the reef, however, and now the reef is only exposed at a very low tide. A number of ships have been wrecked or damaged after hitting the reef. The D'harawal name for the Sow and Pigs Reef is Boora Birra.
