= Georges Head Battery =

- Part of Chowder Bay Barracks Group
- Chowder Bay Road, Georges Heights, New South Wales; Near Sydney in Australia
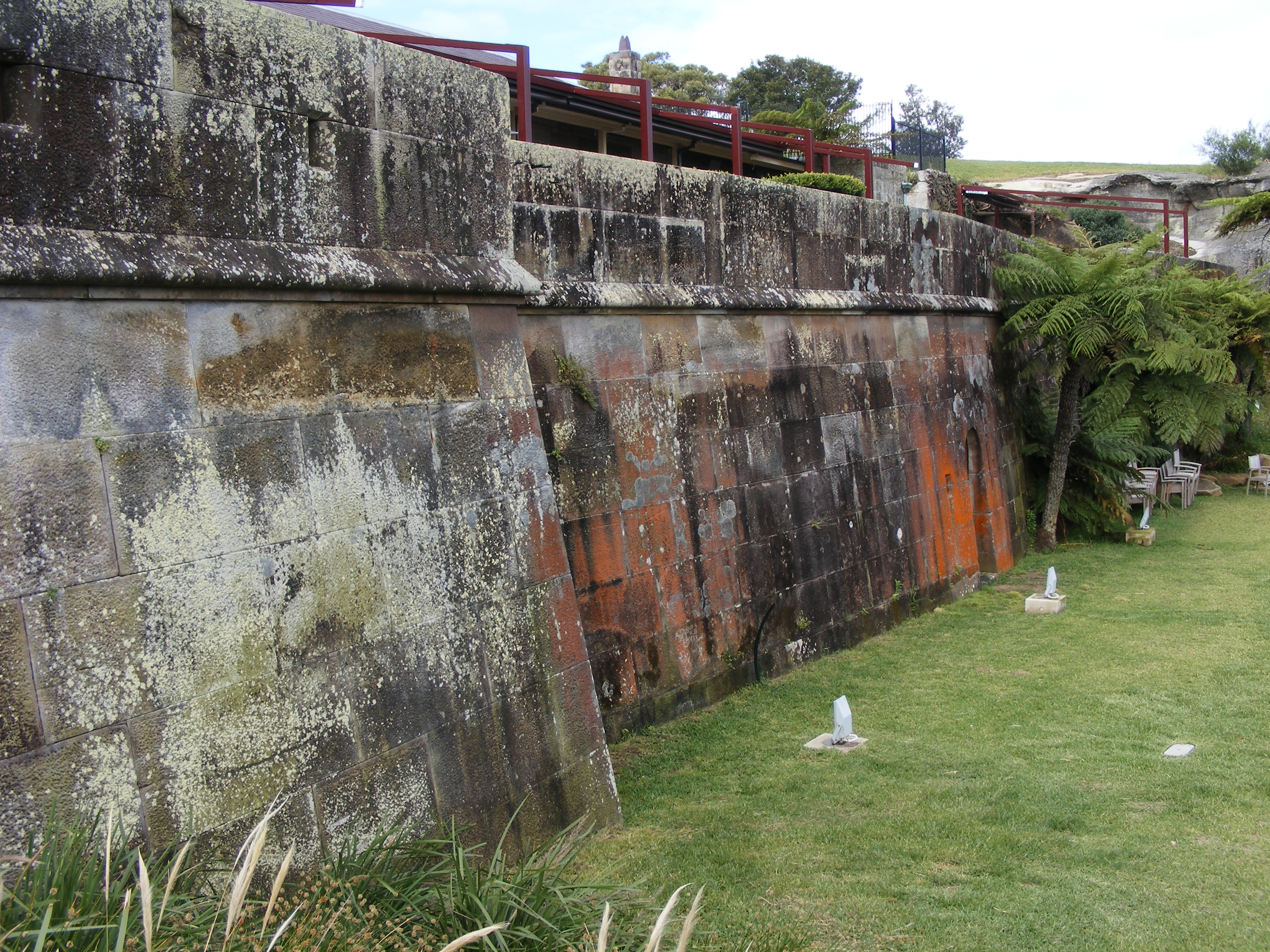
- Exterior of gunners' barracks attached to the Georges Head Battery

Site information
- Owner: Office of Environment & Heritage
- Operator: Sydney Harbour Federation Trust; NSW National Parks & Wildlife Service

Location
- Location in Greater Metropolitan Sydney
- Coordinates: 33°50′11″S 151°15′29″E

Site history
- Built: 1801–1873
- In use: 1801–2002
- Fate: Decommissioned; remnants now contained within the Sydney Harbour National Park

Site notes
- Architect: James Barnet

Commonwealth Heritage List
- Official name: Chowder Bay Barracks Group, Chowder Bay Rd, Georges Heights, NSW, Australia
- Type: Listed place
- Designated: 22 June 2004
- Reference no.: 105254
- Class: Historic
- Place File No: 1/13/026/0008

New South Wales Heritage Register
- Official name: Georges Head Military Fortifications
- Type: State heritage (complex / group)
- Designated: 2 April 1999
- Reference no.: 987
- Type: Fortification
- Category: Defence

The Georges Head Battery, also called the Georges Head Military Fortifications, is a heritage-listed former military fortification located on the Georges Head on Chowder Bay Road, Georges Heights, New South Wales, Australia.

The site consists of the original battery and barracks, designed by Colonial Architect James Barnet, located at the end of Suakin Drive, Georges Heights, two later batteries located adjacent to the corner of Middle Head Road and Best Avenue, Georges Heights, and the Beehive (or Lower) Casemate adjacent to the Armoured (or Upper) Casemate in Chowder Bay Road. The Georges Head Battery is one of three forts in the area that were built for the purpose of defending the outer harbour. The other two forts are located at Middle Head and Bradleys Head, Mosman. The fort became a command post in the 1890s for the coordination of all of Sydney's harbour defences. It was decommissioned in 2002 and part of the land is managed by the Sydney Harbour Federation Trust, with other parts managed by the NSW National Parks & Wildlife Service as part of the Sydney Harbour National Park. The property is owned by Office of Environment & Heritage.

The site was added to the New South Wales State Heritage Register on 2 April 1999.

== History ==
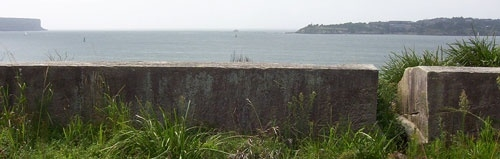
1803 Fort, looking towards Sydney Heads

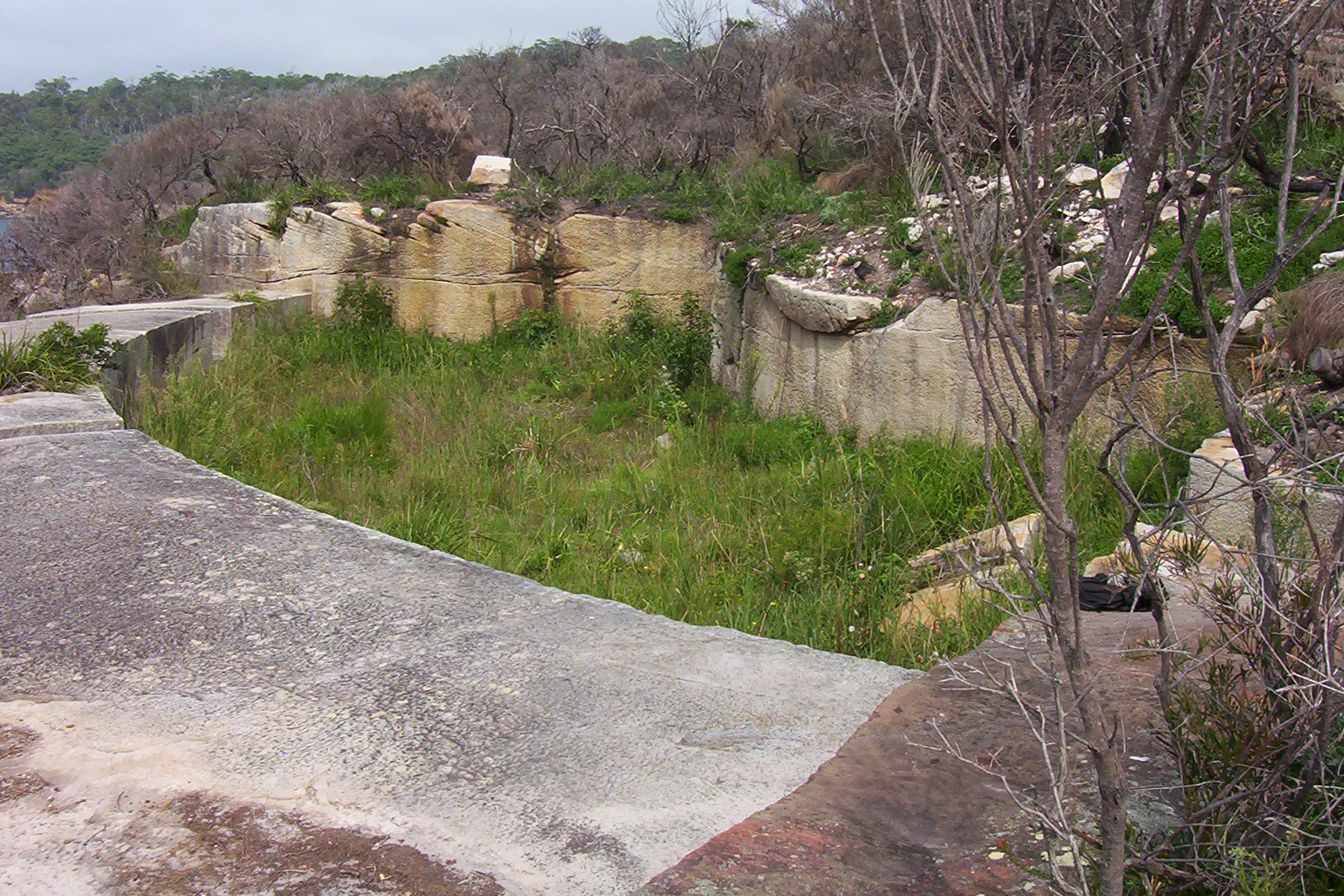

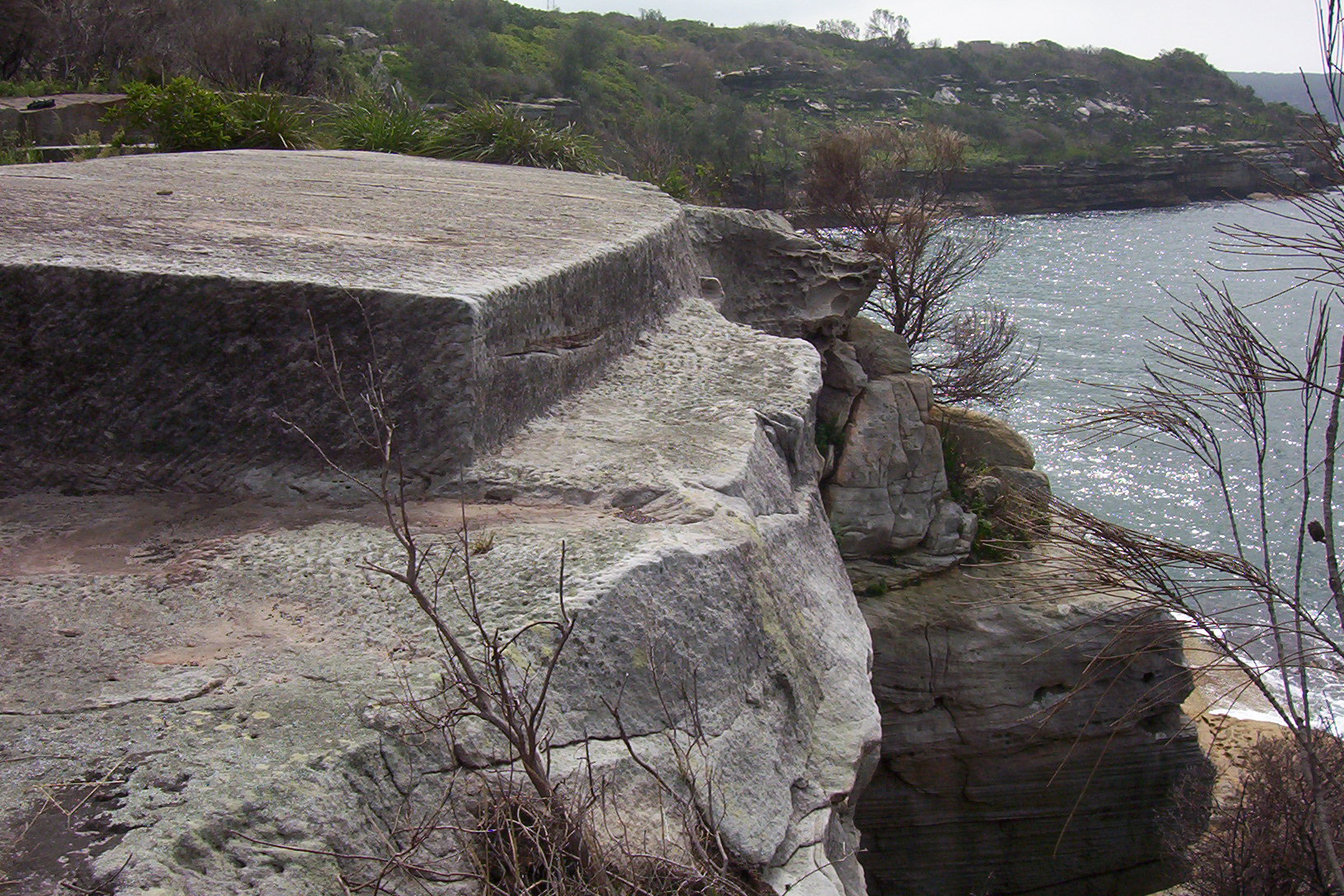

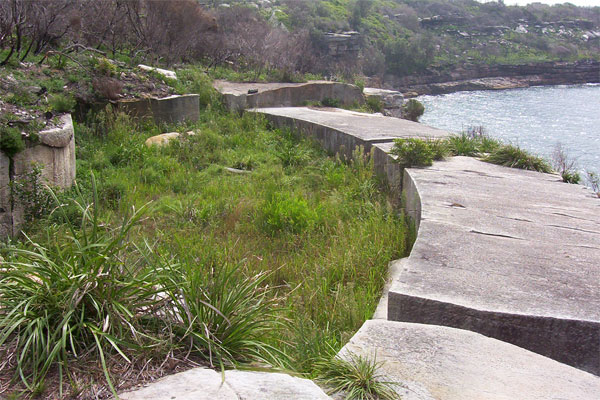

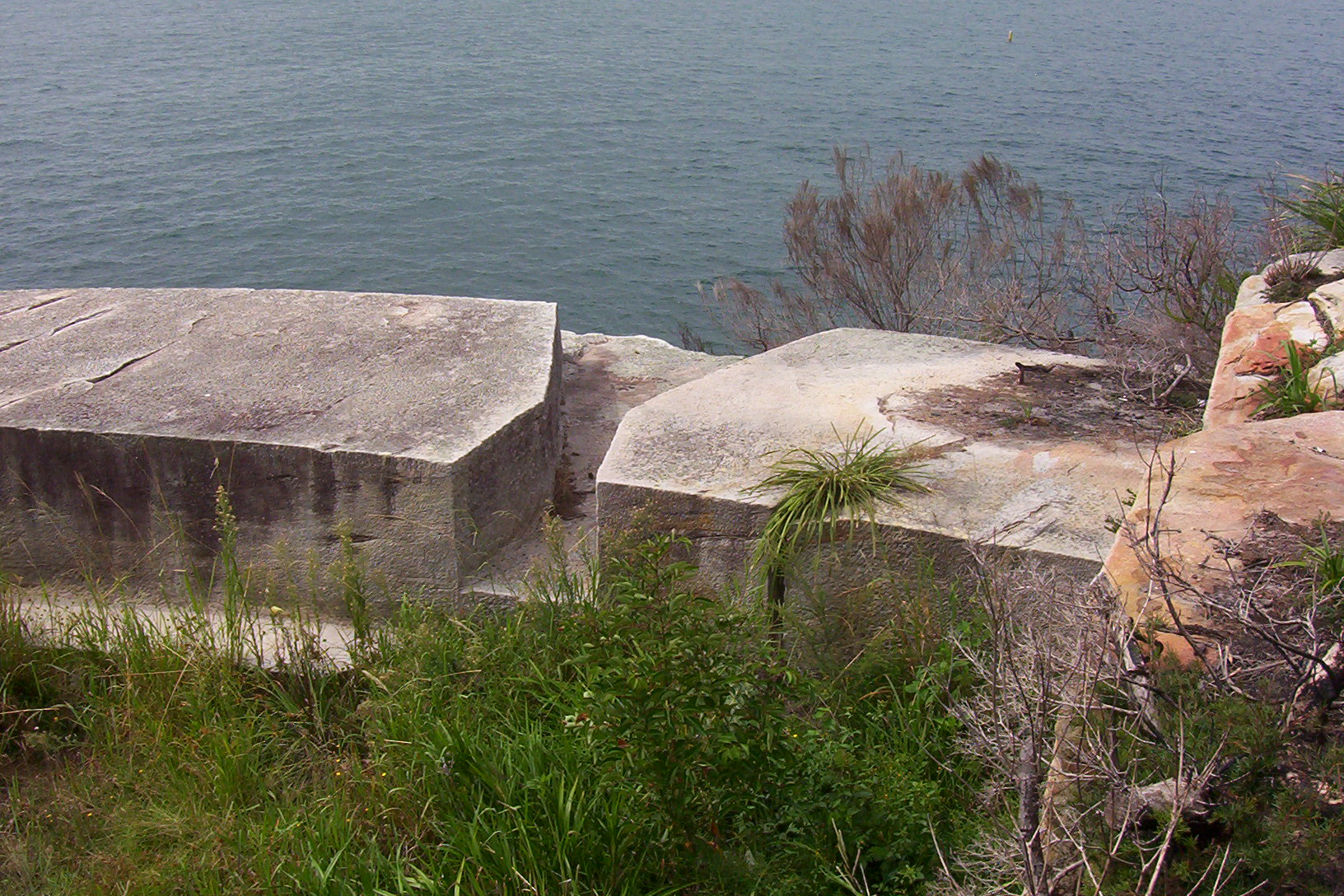

Australian Defence activity began in this area of Sydney Harbour as early as 1803 when a gun battery was installed on Georges Head. Built between 1801 and 1803 the then so called "Georges Head" battery was hewn by hand out of solid rock using a work gang of 44 convicts on what is now known as Obelisk Point near Middle Head. The Georges Head Battery is in fact 1 km to the south west. This is the oldest remaining colonial fortification in Australia and was built to defend the entrance to Sydney Harbour during the Napoleonic wars. The fort was isolated from Sydney town and was abandoned a few years after construction. In July 2010 the NSW Governor, Marie Bashir, officially reopened the site and the historic fort was recognised.

On 10 March 1801 Governor Philip Gidley King informed the Secretary of State for Colonies that a battery was "in forwardness opposite the entrance to the Harbour, which will completely prevent attack from without". Despite that confidence, the job took another two years to finish. With only picks, crowbars, wedges and sledgehammers, a gun pit was cut out of solid sandstone, leaving a curved parapet 24-metre (80 ft) long on the cliff edge about 15 metres (50 ft) above sea level. There were two embrasures or gun openings, but guns could also be fired over the parapet. The guns – four twelve-pounders and two six-pounders – were landed at Obelisk Beach (then known as Georges Beach) and hauled up through the bush. Also in the gun pit was built a magazine for powder and shot, with stone walls three feet thick. The Sydney Gazette reported on 23 October 1803 that "The new battery is compleated and the artificers and labourers recalled ... the battery mounts six guns, two long twelves [12 pounders] on the right, two of the same size on the left and two short sixes in the centre. The first of these command the bay inwardly, those on the left command the entrance of the harbour between the heads and those in the centre point across the channel."

With the French threat in the east removed with the capture of Mauritius in 1810 the battery was abandoned and never used again for military purposes.

In 1815 Governor Macquarie established a farm for Aborigines and placed Bungaree in charge. The experiment did not succeed.

=== 1870s ===
Following the removal of the British forces from Australia in 1870, construction began in 1871 on the battery at Georges Head and was completed in 1873. The departure of British forces put the onus on colonies like New South Wales and Victoria to assist in, and organize its own defences, prior to the Federation of Australia.

Georges Head Battery was an outer line harbour defence fortification designed especially to attack and prevent enemy ships from infiltrating the inner harbour. The fort held a prominent position and was located high above sea level with strategic views to the entrance of Port Jackson. Other batteries were located on Middle Head, South Head, Shark Point and Bradleys Head, but none were ever used for combative purposes.

Georges Head was armed with four 80-pounder rifled muzzle loading guns and two 68-pounder guns. The rifled guns were conversions of the long-obsolete 68-pounder smooth bore guns, and a common weapon in British colonies. It took three months and 250 soldiers to roll the gun barrels all the way from North Sydney to the batteries. They came along a rough track which later became Military Road. The guns had been positioned so poorly that this created the risk of one gun firing upon another. Also, the guns and soldiers were visible from the harbour. In 1877 large mounds of earth were placed between the pits to make sure the guns could not fire upon each other and to help protect the gun crew from enemy fire. When construction of the fort was complete, there were a total of 41 gun emplacements positioned around the harbour.

Defence tactics were planned using telescopes and plotters mounted in the middle of the second gun pit. From the telephone exchange, the Port Jackson District Commandant could communicate with all military installations on the harbour. Telephone cables ran through the tunnels, down the cliff and under the harbour to batteries on the other side.

=== 1880s ===
In 1888 Georges Head was chosen as the best place to observe and fire underwater mines, the latest in harbour defences. Each underwater mine was attached to an electric cable that ran up the cliff to a firing post. From there, miners watched for ships entering the harbour. The miners' job was to explode the mine closest to an approaching enemy ship. Minefields were laid across the main shipping channels of Port Jackson from 1876 to 1922 and a base was built at Chowder Bay for the submarine miners.

The work of the submarine miner was secretive, technical and dangerous. During a demonstration in 1891, a crowd of several thousand watched as a terrible accident killed four miners and injured another eight.

=== World War II ===
In 1942, during World War II the Sydney Harbour anti-submarine boom net was installed. The boom net spanned the entire width of Sydney Harbour from Green (Laings) Point, Watsons Bay to Georges Heights in Mosman.

The command post remained until the 1930s. The area then became home to various defence bases until 2002 when the Australian Army left after 130 years at Georges Head. The area in which the fortifications are situated is now open to the public and the Sydney Harbour Federation Trust has restored the historic fortifications, creating a new type of lookout.

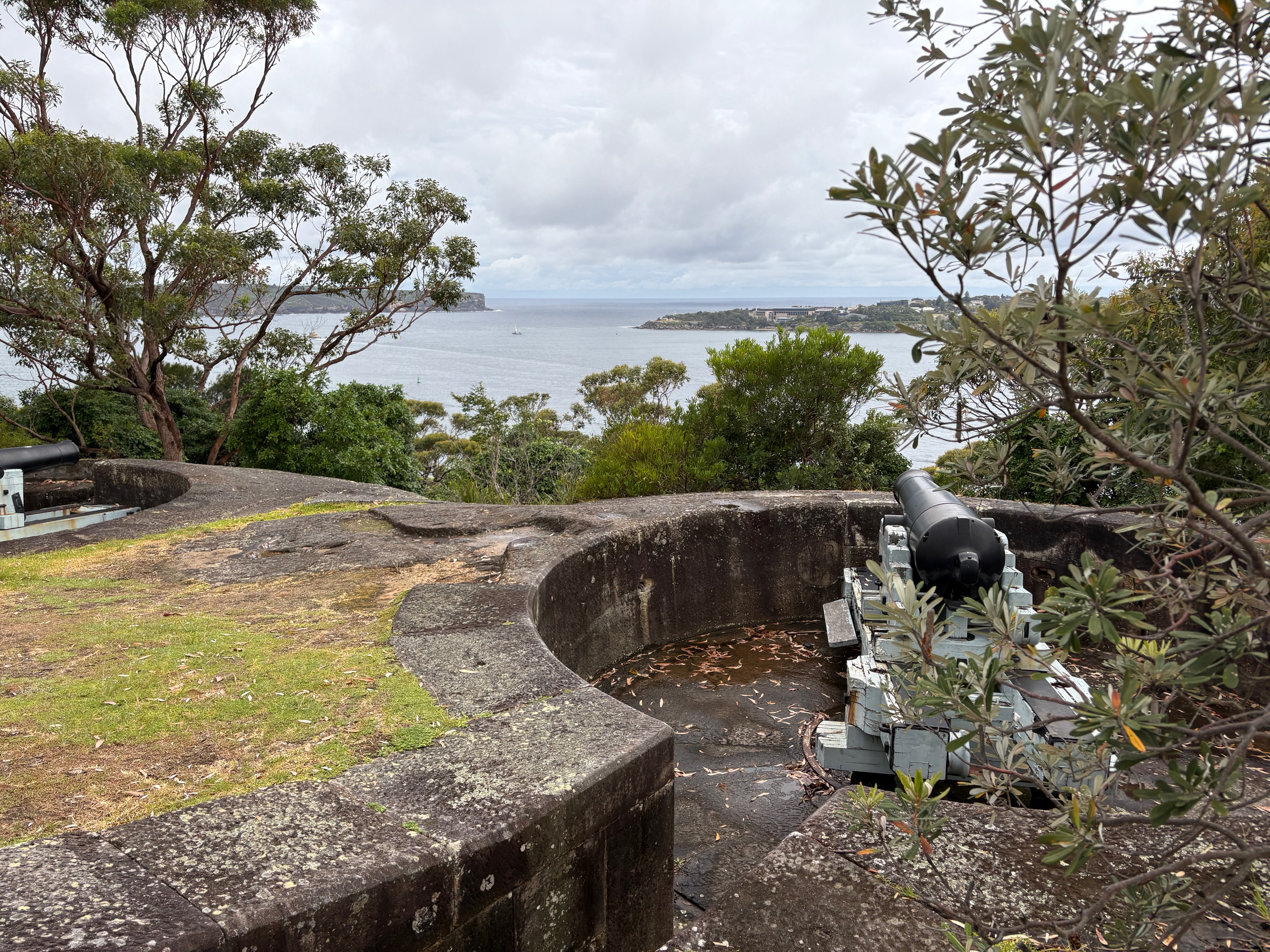
Guarding the Heads

== Casualty clearing station and storage facility ==
The hospital was carved out of solid rock during the construction of the tunnel system in 1872, and was originally designed to provide a storage room for the black powder charge used when firing the 68-pounder and 80-pounder guns of the battery.

The floor was originally covered in a bituminous substance, the walls were tiled with ceramic tiles not unlike those seen on the wall pictured, and the tunnel ceiling leading to the room was lined with cork. The purpose of these measures was to reduce the possibility of sparks and the potential for a powder explosion. The zigzag tunnel at the far end of the room was designed to act as a blast wall to contain any blast within the immediate area.

The room has been modified since 1872 and was used as a casualty clearing station in 1932/33 when the battery was re-gunned with the 6 inch breech loaded MK7 guns. Designed for emergencies only, it saw no casualties of war.

== Heritage listing ==
Georges Heights and in particular the Officer's mess precinct is culturally significant for the important role it played in the strategic defence of Sydney. This commenced with the initial fortification phase in 1871(−1884) and extended through the submarine mine defence phase (1884–1922), the federation of Australian States and thus it became part of the wider coastal network of defences.

The site is part of the network of fortifications that were established to protect Sydney Harbour from attack. Alterations to the A84 Battery show the continual evolution and development of defensive systems and the application of the most modern technology and building techniques. The buildings in the precinct illustrate the evolution of defence accommodation from the 1871 Barracks (later the Officer's Mess) to 1892 Married Quarters (now Gunshot Alley) to the 1954 separate individual rooms (Officers' Mess Accommodation).

The buildings have been associated with key people in NSW history particularly;

- Colonial architect James Barnet, who was one of Australia's greatest architects and designed the original barracks (now Officers' Mess); and
- FR de Wolski, Engineer-in-Chief of Defence Works around 1890 and who contributed to the establishment of Gunshot Alley.

The site has remained in government and military ownership from the earliest British settlement and thus provides strong research potential in its structures and surface cultural deposits to demonstrate past ways of military life. The construction of fortifications on the site followed the departure of British Imperial forces in 1870 and is evidence of the British Government's resolve that colonies with responsible government should bear the cost of their own defence.

George's Head has outstanding aesthetic values as a prominent headland. The site is valued by the local community and Defence personnel for its role as a vantage point and as a gateway to the harbour. It is also a rare remnant of fragile natural environment, and is also valued for its historical uses.

Georges Head Military Fortifications was listed on the New South Wales State Heritage Register on 2 April 1999, and in 2004 the Chowder Bay Barracks Group, including the Georges Head Battery, was inscribed on the Australian Heritage Database. George's Head was part of the Middle Head and George's Heights defence site listed on the (now defunct) Register of the National Estate, and contains three separate independent listings, the A84 Battery, Battery C9A and the 1873 Officers' Mess building.

== Gallery ==
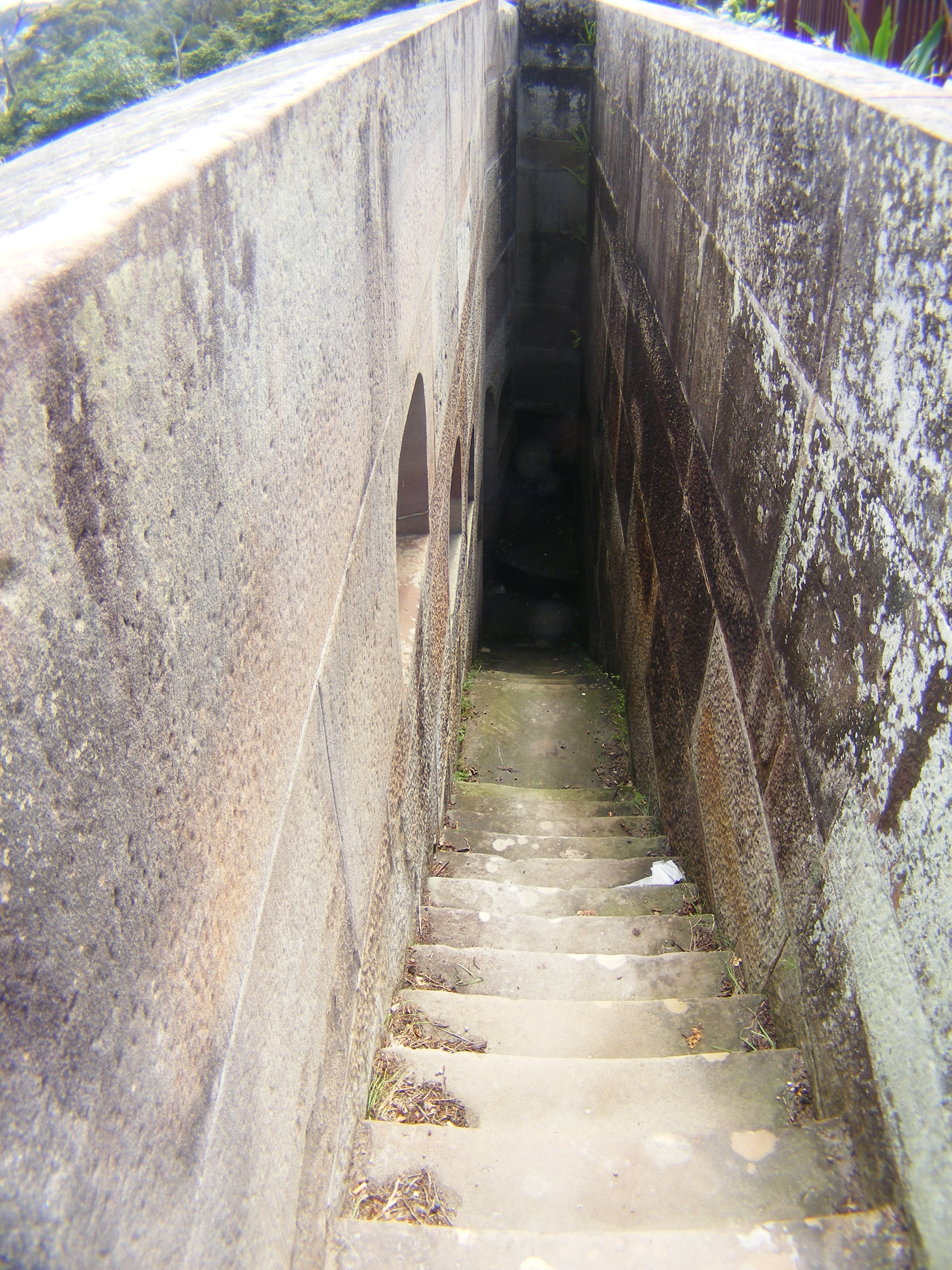

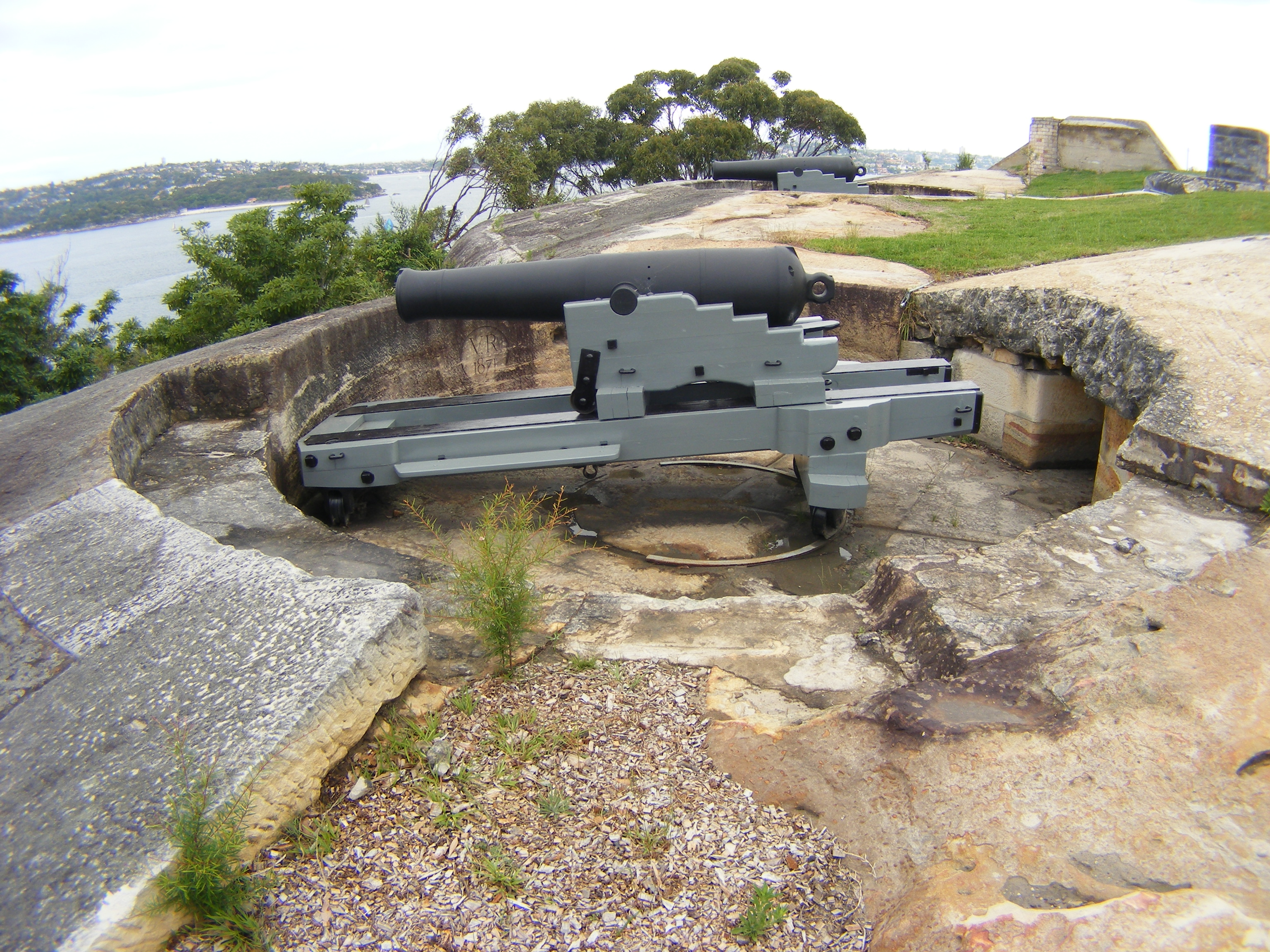

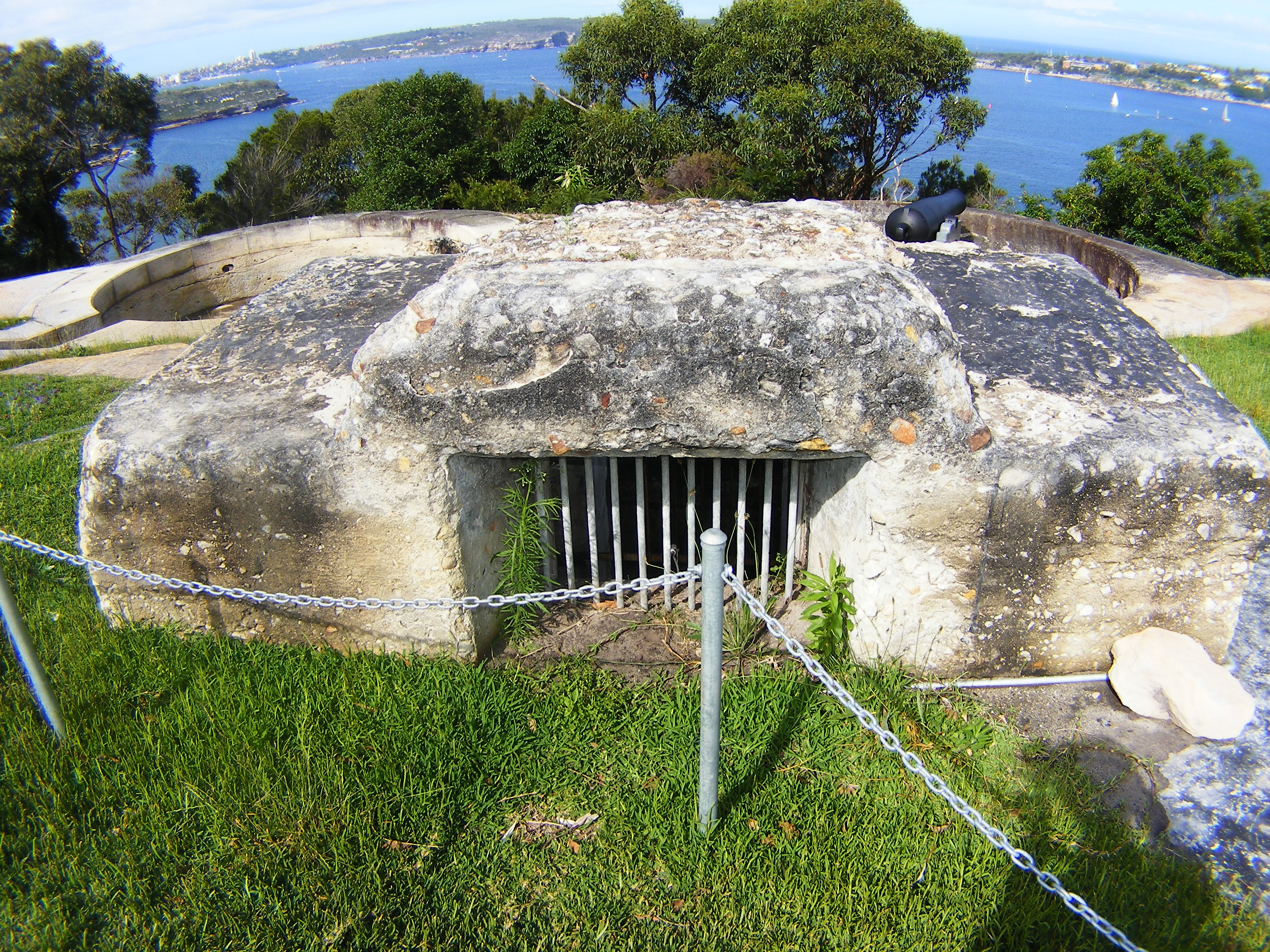

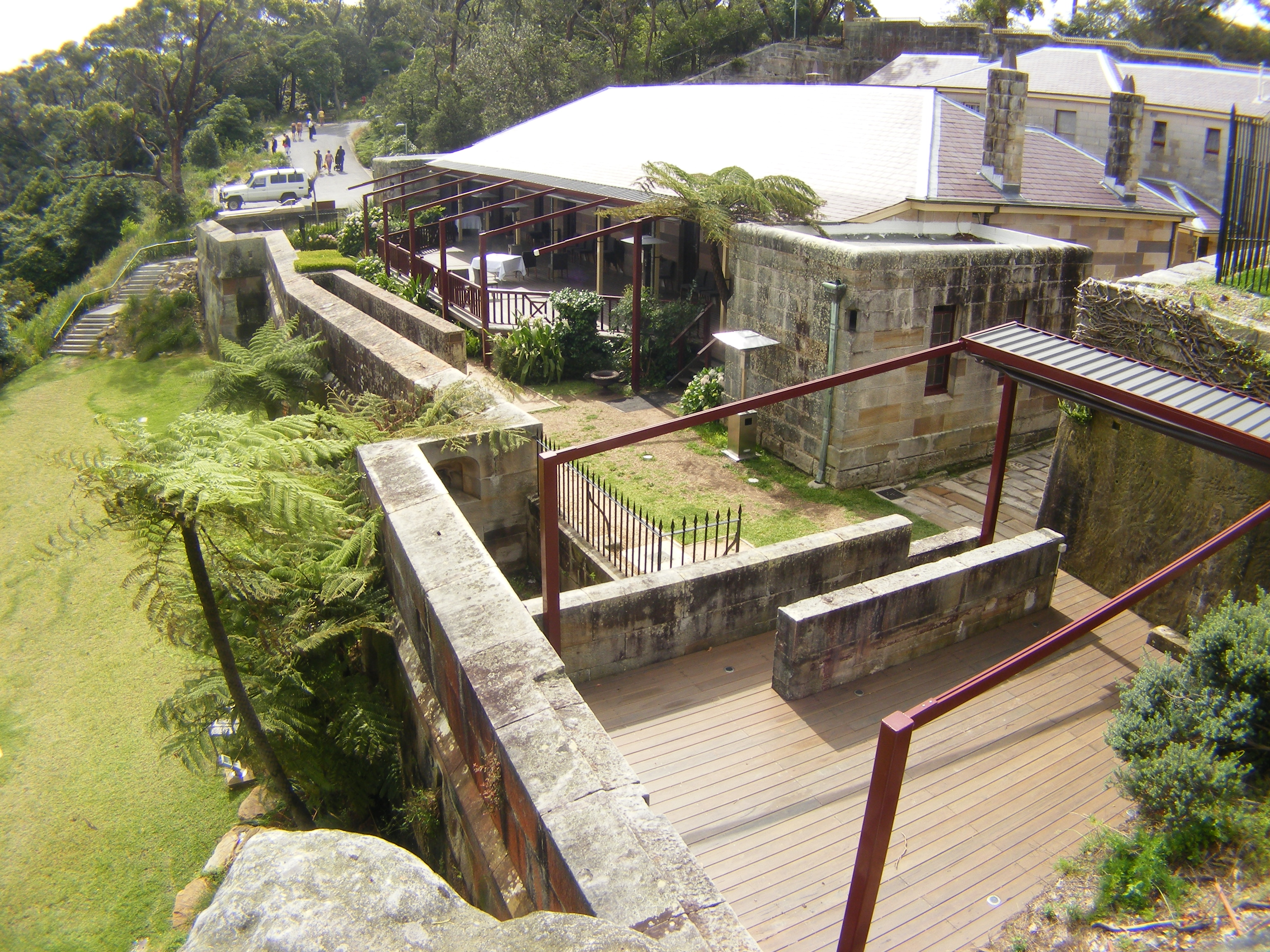
Former officers' residence and barracks, now a restaurant

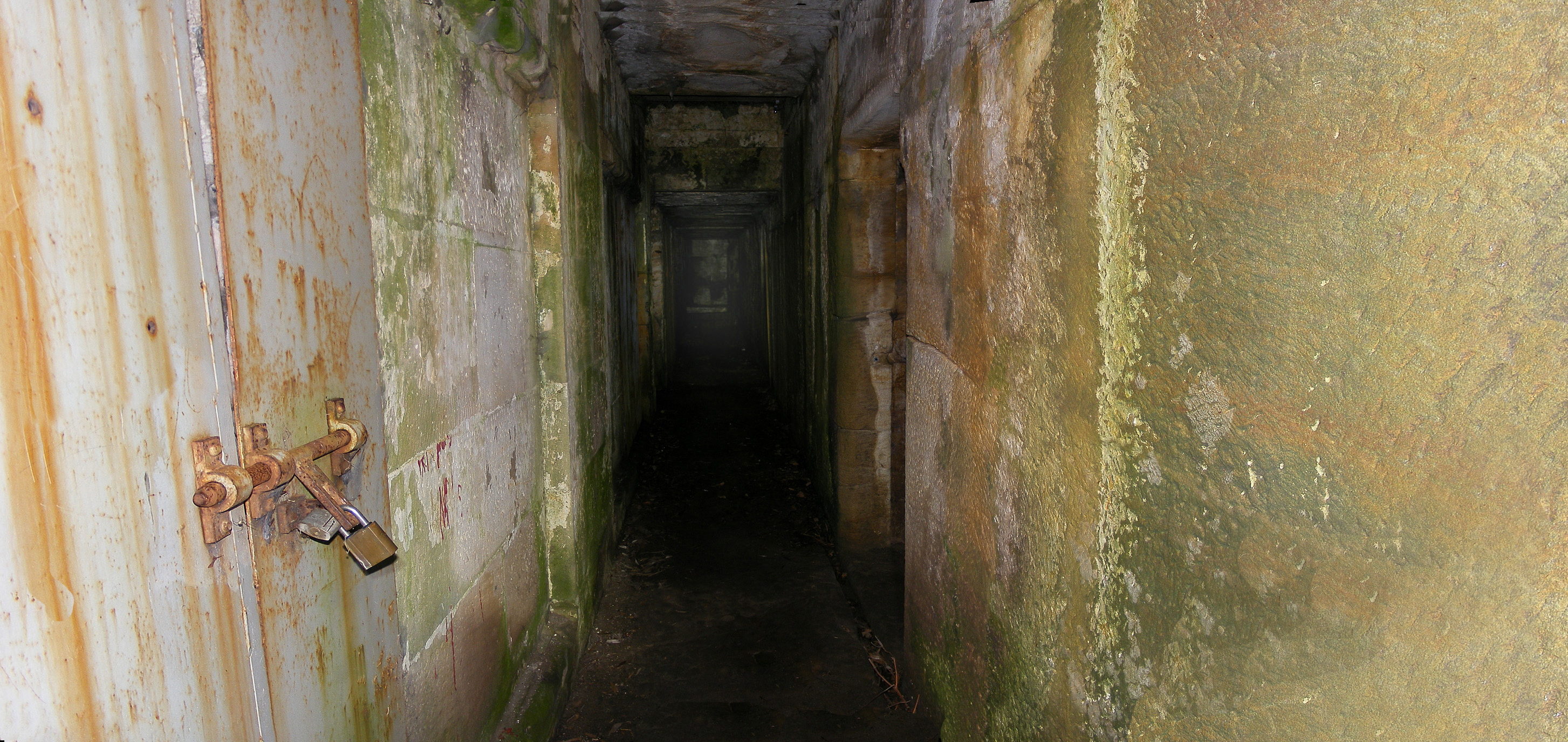

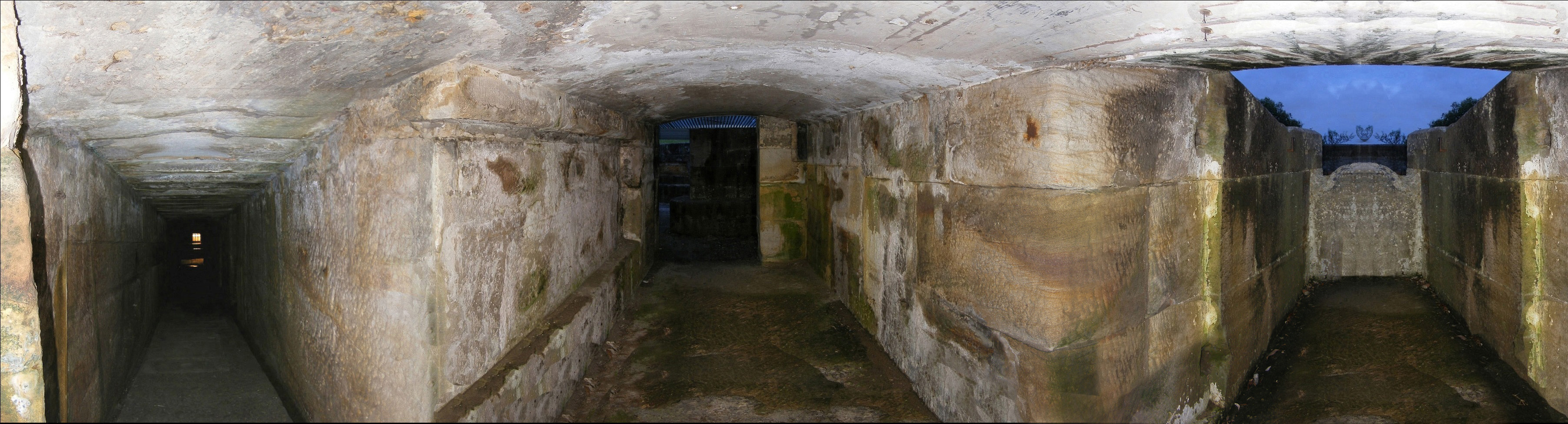
The tunnel complex within

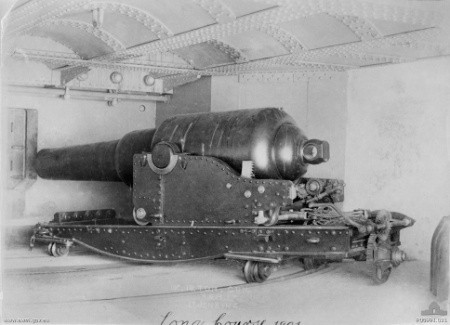
RML 10 inch 18 ton gun in 1891

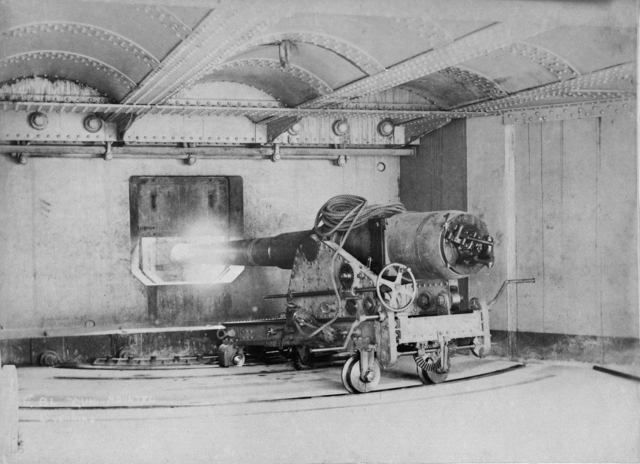
Replaced by BL 6 inch Mk V guns in 1892

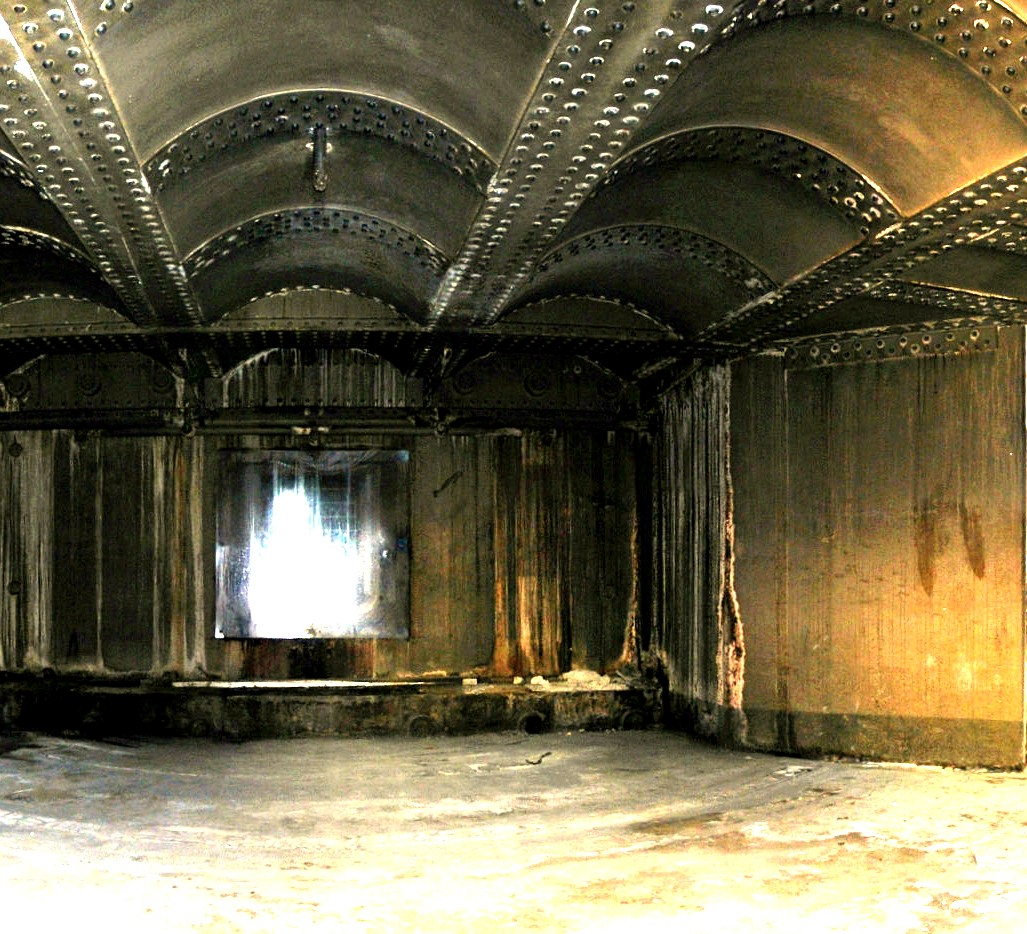
One of the three gun rooms today

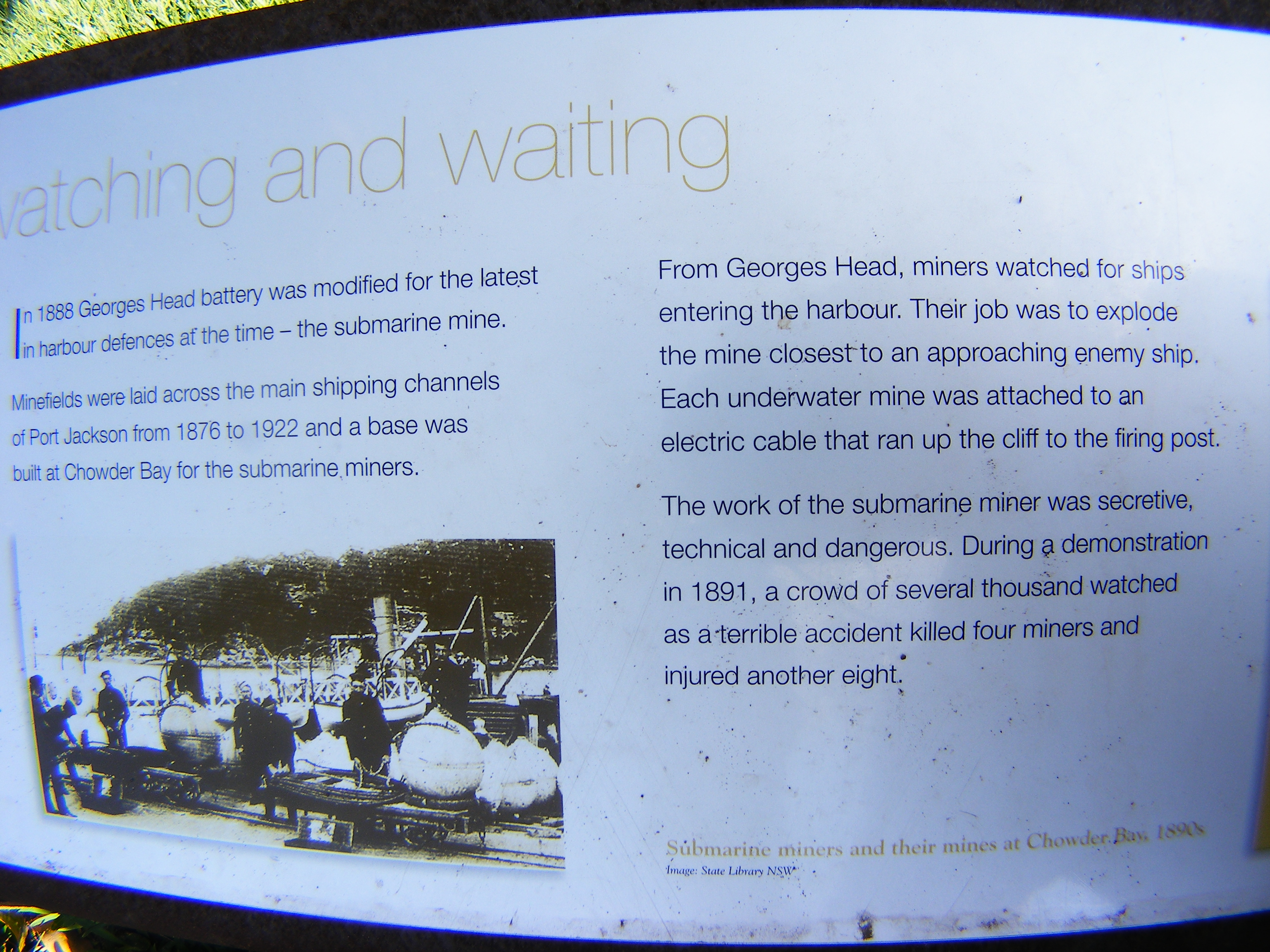

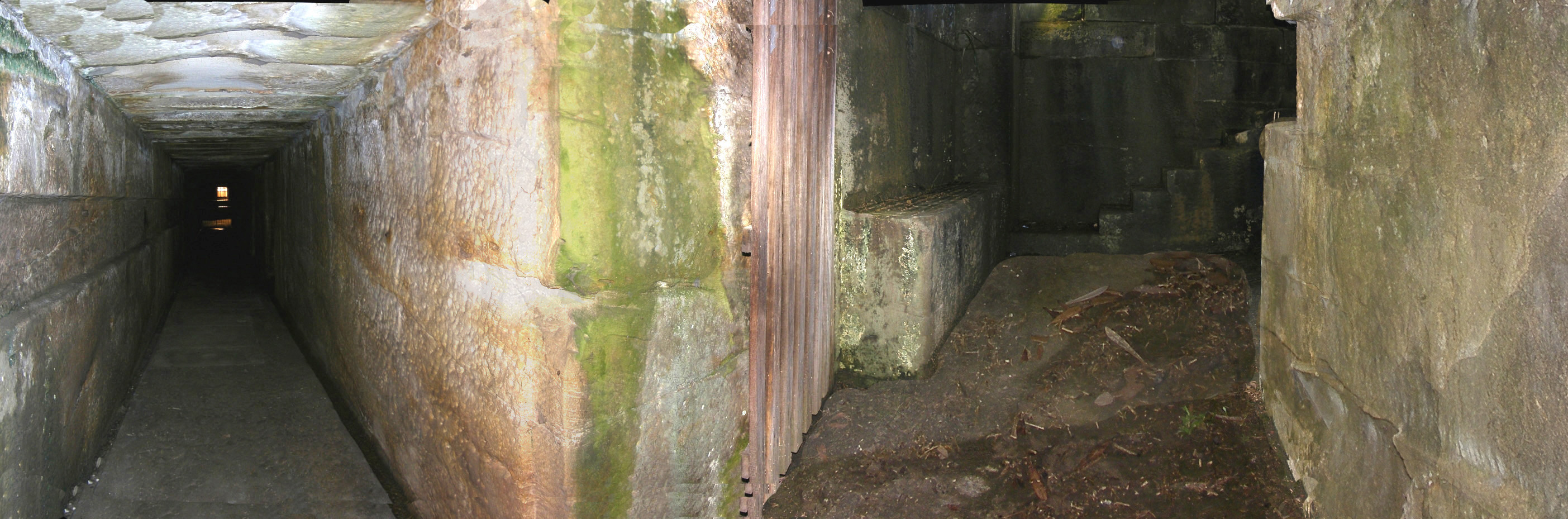
A tunnel leading to the former officers residence

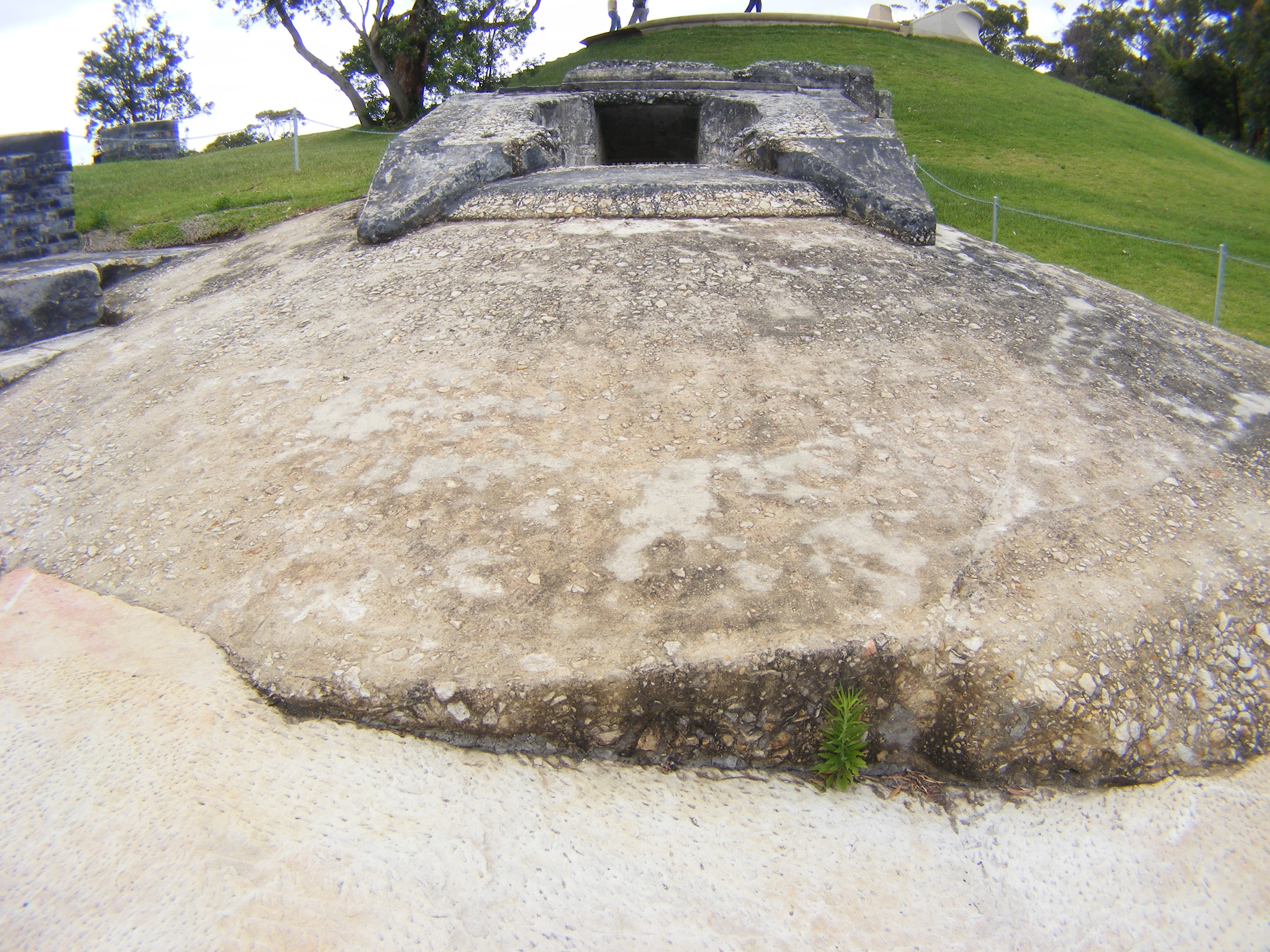
A submarine mine observing station behind the gun emplacements

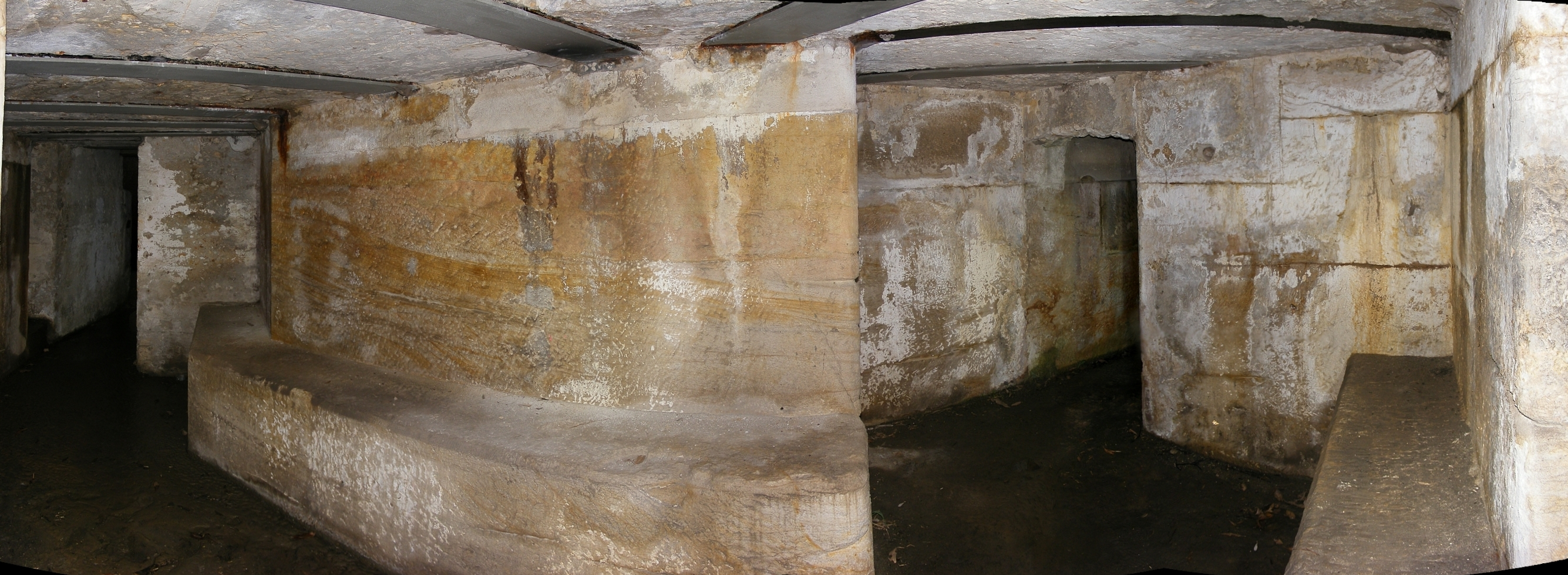
In one of the battery's trenches

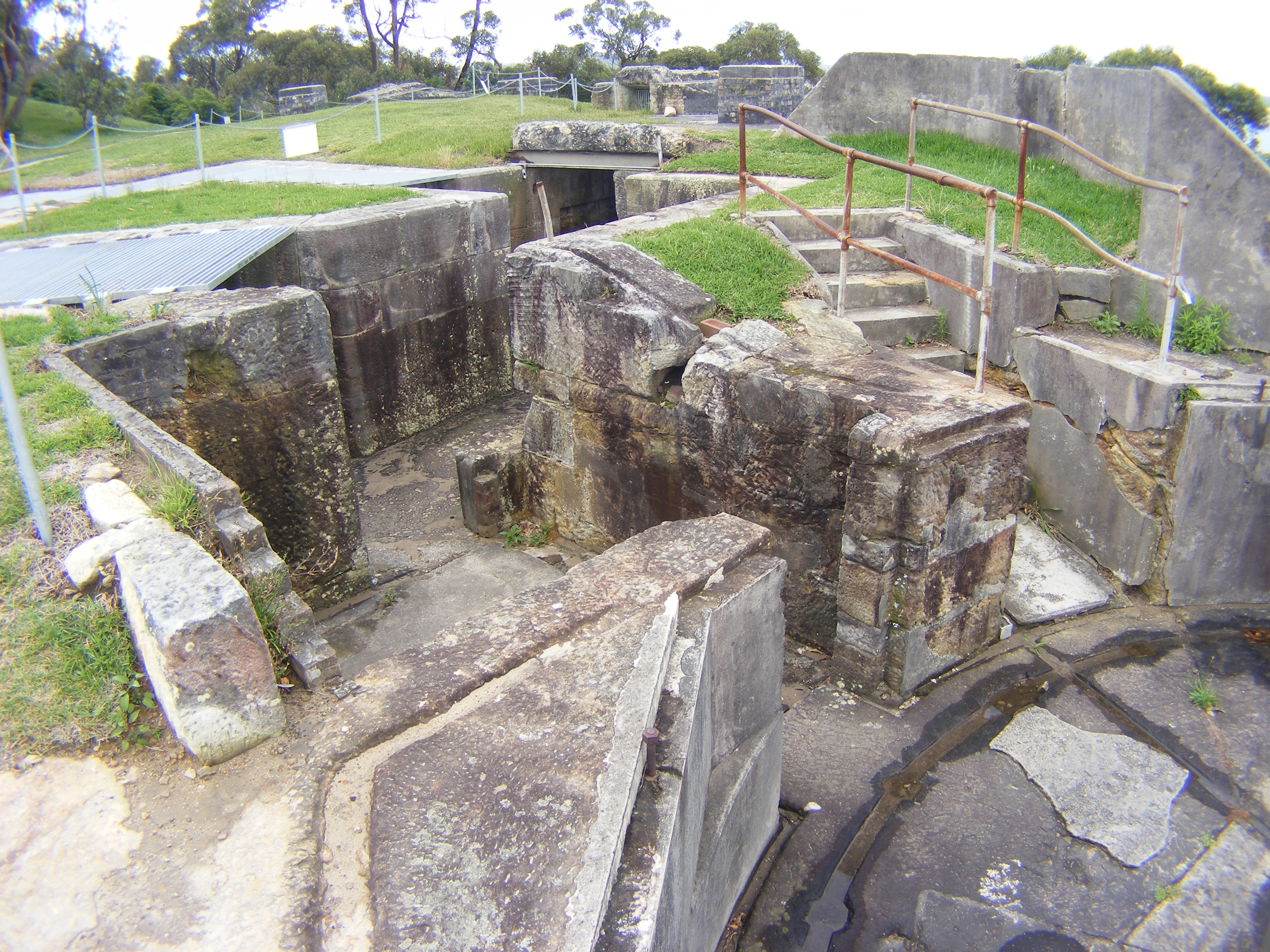
Part of the fortification tunnel complex from above

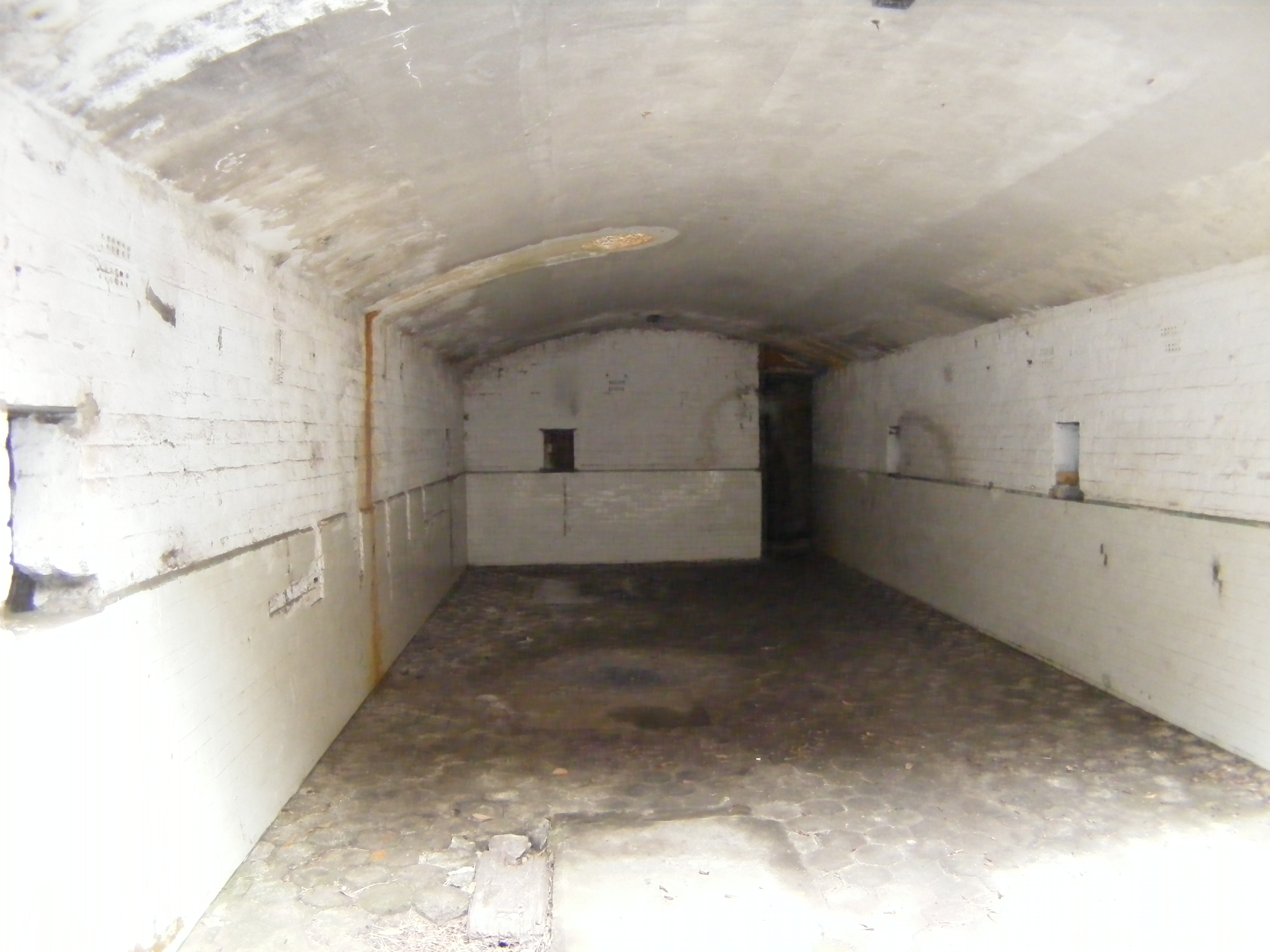
The battery casualty clearing station, once storage facility

== See also ==
- Bradleys Head Fortification Complex
- Middle Head Fortifications
- Protected areas of New South Wales
- Military history of Australia
- Garden Island Tunnel System
