= Beauty Point =

Beauty Point may refer to:

- Beauty Point, Tasmania, Australia
- Beauty Point, New South Wales, Australia
