= The Spit, New South Wales =

Coordinates: 33°48′50″S 151°14′35″E

The Spit
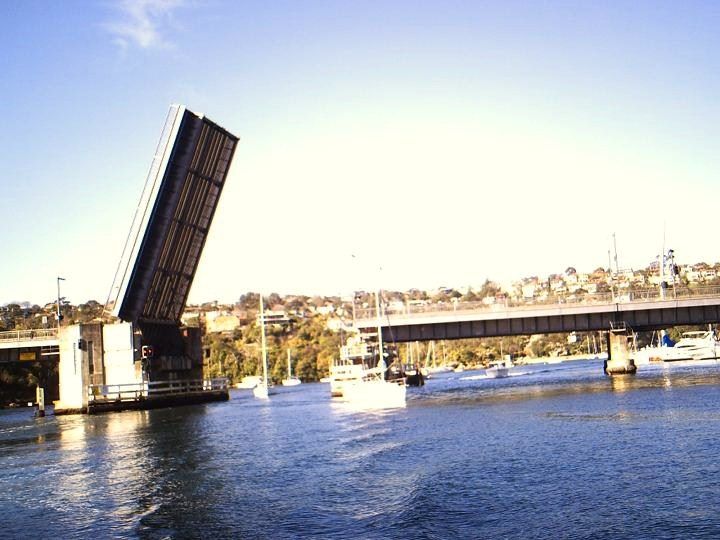
- Spit Bridge
- Interactive map of The Spit
- Country: Australia
- State: New South Wales
- City: Sydney
- LGA: Municipality of Mosman
- Location: 9 km (5.6 mi) north-east of Sydney CBD
- Postcode: 2088
Localities around The Spit
| | Seaforth | Clontarf |
| Beauty Point | The Spit |
| | Spit Junction | Balmoral |

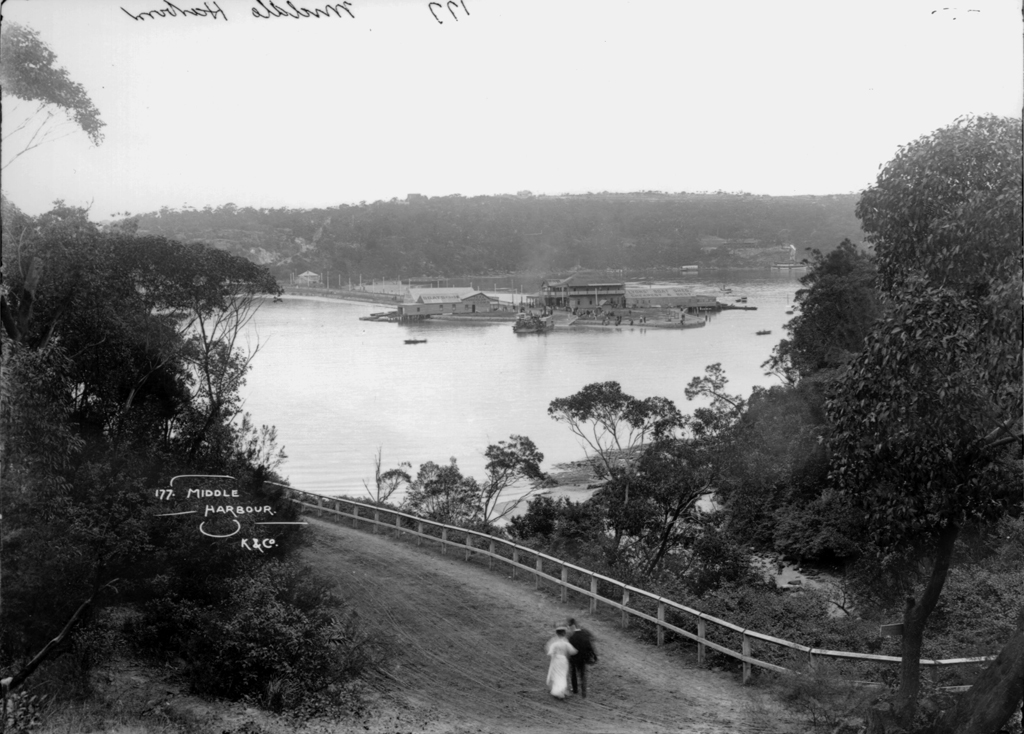
The Spit, Middle Harbour (pre-1900)

The Spit is an urban locality in the suburb of Mosman in Sydney, New South Wales, Australia. The Spit is located in the local government area of the Municipality of Mosman and is part of the Lower North Shore.

== Landmarks ==
The Spit protrudes off Beauty Point and is home to the Spit Bridge, a bascule bridge opened in 1958 over Middle Harbour. The bridge opens at set times to allow yachts with high masts to pass. The Spit is the site of the Middle Harbour Yacht Club and a marina.

== History ==
The Aboriginal name for The Spit is Burra Bra.

From as early as 1834, a ferry operated by Barney Kearns carried passengers across the waters of Middle Harbour. From the 1850s, a punt operated by Peter Ellery, carried passengers across for sixpence and horse-drawn vehicles were charged 1s 6d. If the horses swam across, there was a reduction of sixpence. In 1889, it was replaced by a government steam punt. A wooden bridge was opened in 1924 after the electric tram lines were extended to the Spit. This was replaced by the bascule bridge in 1958, which was needed to cope with heavy traffic from the Sydney CBD to the Northern Beaches. Chinamans Beach was named after the Chinese residents who had market gardens and salt pans there, it is now a popular family beach.

== Heritage listings ==
The Spit has a number of heritage-listed sites, including:

- Monash Crescent (East Side): Middle Harbour Syphon
