= Clifton Gardens, New South Wales =

Clifton Gardens
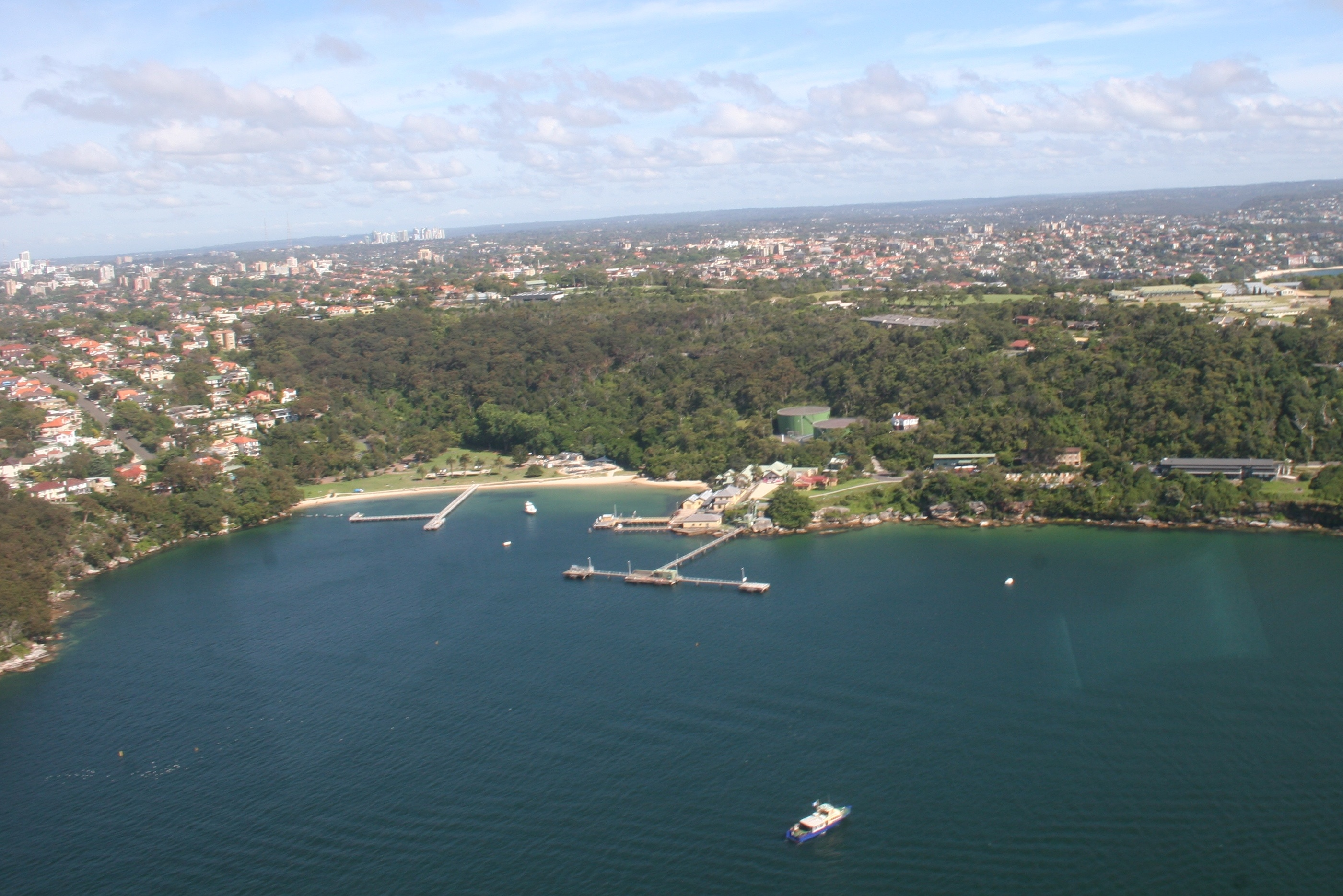
- Aerial view of Clifton Gardens Reserve

- Interactive map of Clifton Gardens
- Coordinates: 33.84211°S 151.24755°E
- Country: Australia
- State: New South Wales
- City: Sydney
- LGA: Municipality of Mosman
- Location: 8 km (5.0 mi) north-east of Sydney CBD
- Postcode: 2088
Localities around Clifton Gardens
Spit Junction	Georges Heights
Clifton Gardens

Clifton Gardens is an urban locality in the suburb of Mosman in Sydney, New South Wales, Australia. Clifton Gardens is located in the local government area of the Municipality of Mosman and is part of the Lower North Shore. Clifton Gardens is adjacent to Chowder Bay.

Clifton Gardens features an affluent residential area and is home to several beaches and wharves on Sydney Harbour. Clifton Gardens is also a popular fishing spot in summer. Species like the yellowtail kingfish, bonito and Australian salmon are caught frequently during summer months. In winter trevally can be caught quite regularly.

== History ==
Early settler Captain E. H. Cliffe purchased a 23-hectare (56-acre) estate on the water's edge; he named it "Cliffeton" and it is believed that the area's name was derived from that. A hotel called the Clifton Arms was built in 1871 by D. Butters. It was leased in 1879 then bought in 1880 by David Thompson who built the Marine Hotel that operated from 1885 to 1967. Thompson also built a wharf and dancing pavilion here and the area became popular as a picnic spot.

In 1906, Sydney Ferries Limited purchased the Thompson estate comprising land, the three-storey hotel, wharf dancing pavilion and skating rink. The company built a large circular swimming enclosure that could hold 3,000 spectators, a boatshed and a tramway from the wharf to the hotel. Before the First World War, ferries full of picnickers came at weekends. The structure burnt down in 1956.

Clifton Gardens Hotel was demolished on 17 November 1967.

== Schools ==
- Blessed Sacrament Catholic Primary School

== Churches ==
- Blessed Sacrament Catholic Church

== Gallery ==
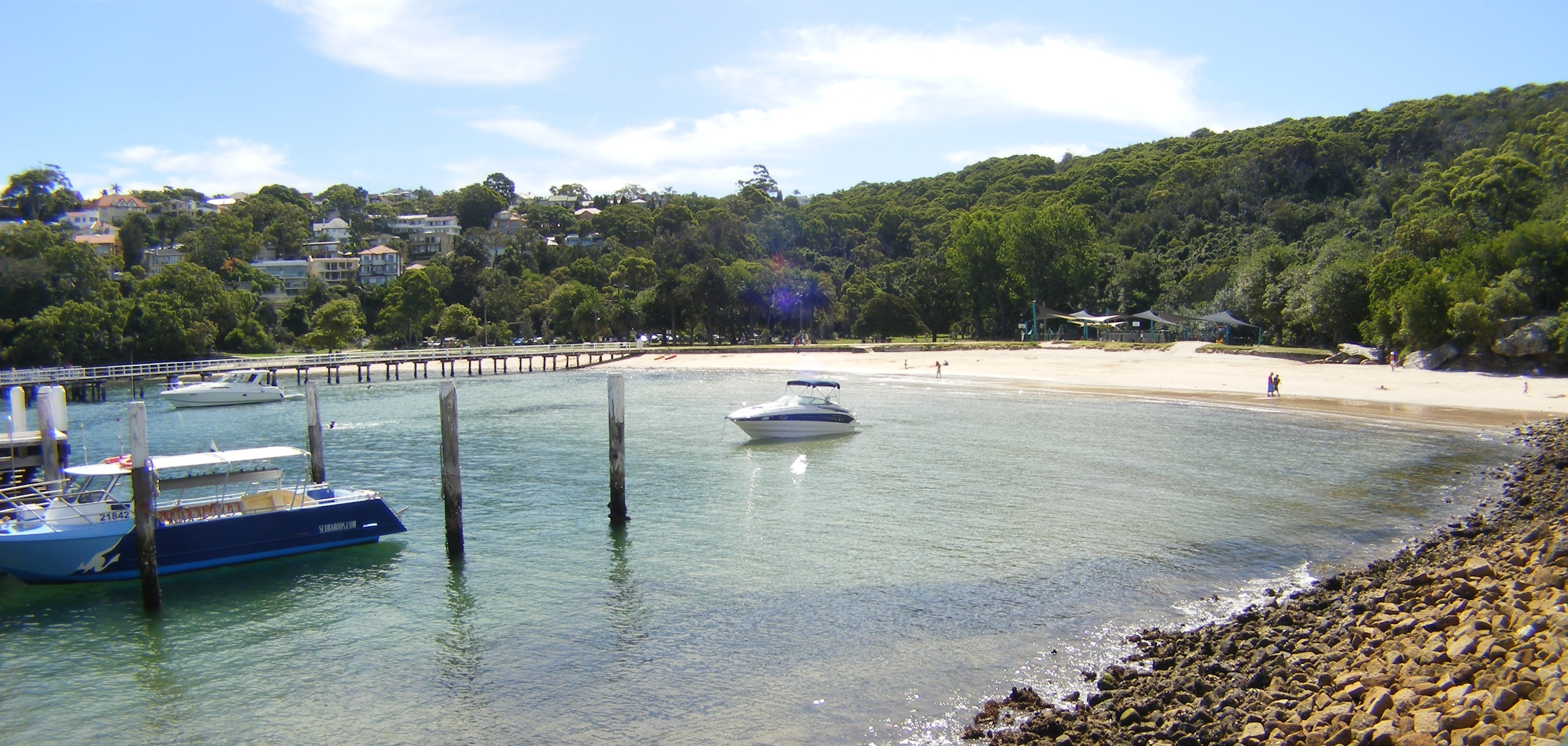
Chowder Bay, Clifton Gardens

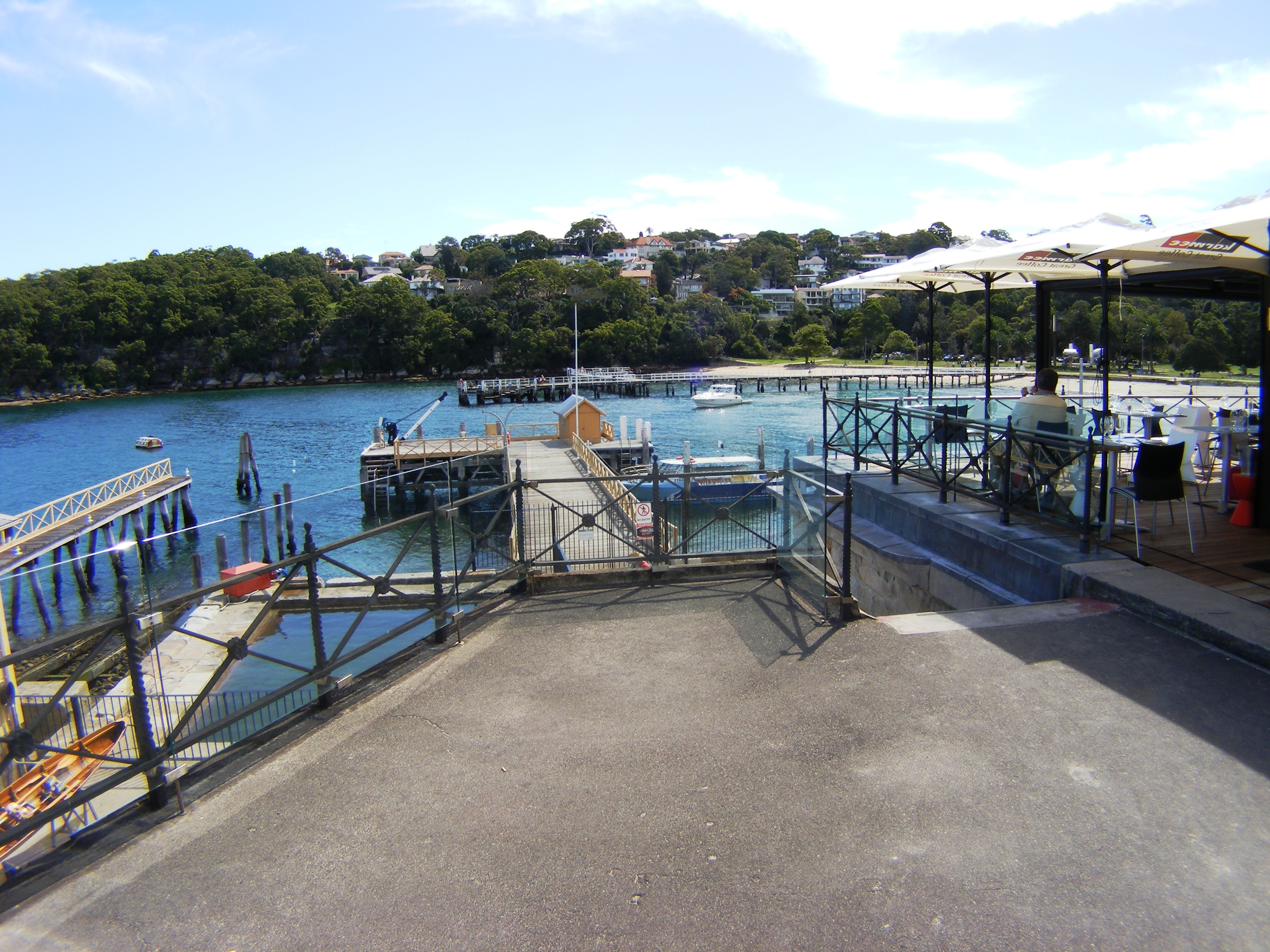
Submarine miners depot, wharf

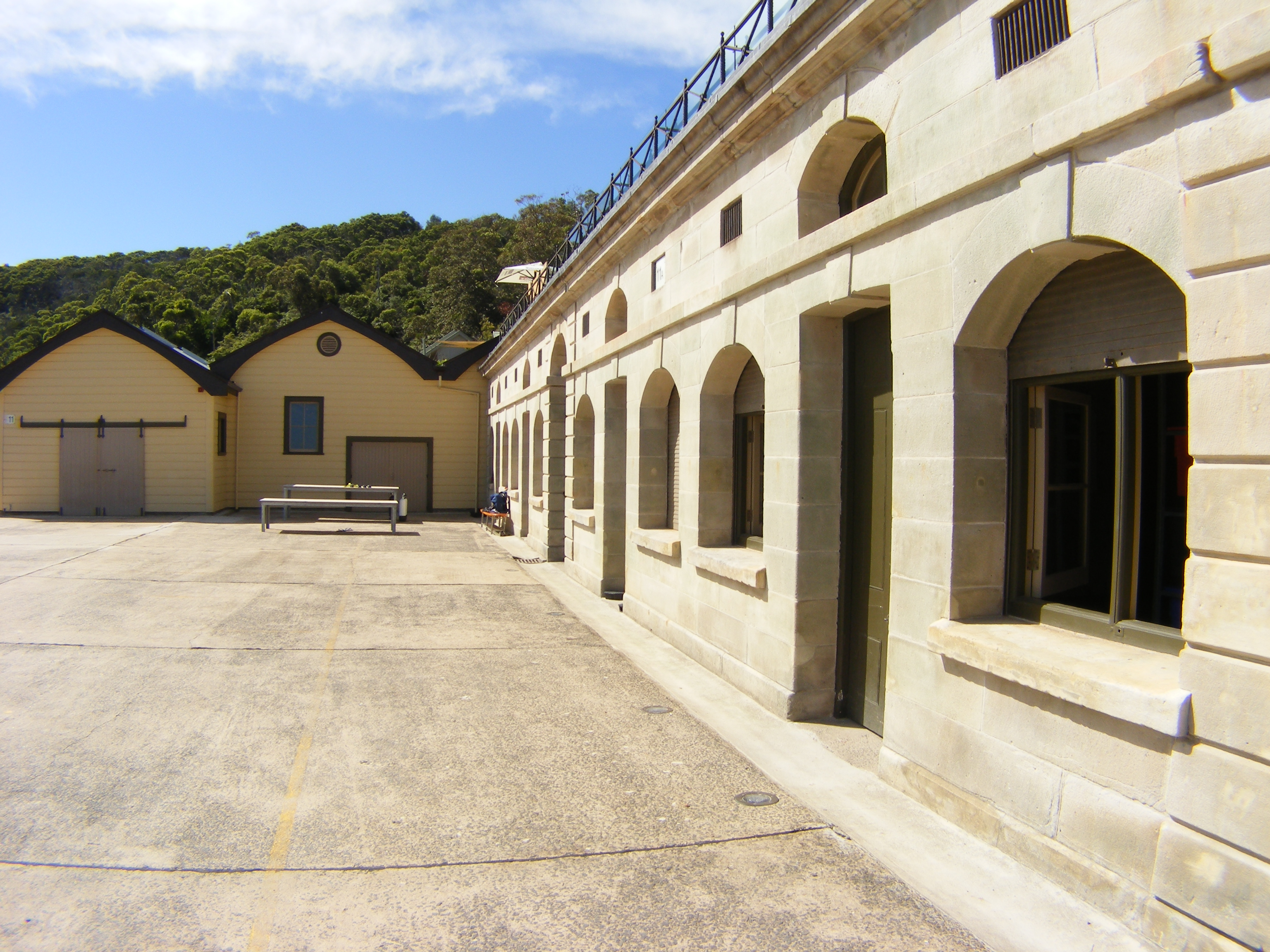
Submarine miners depot, Clifton Gardens

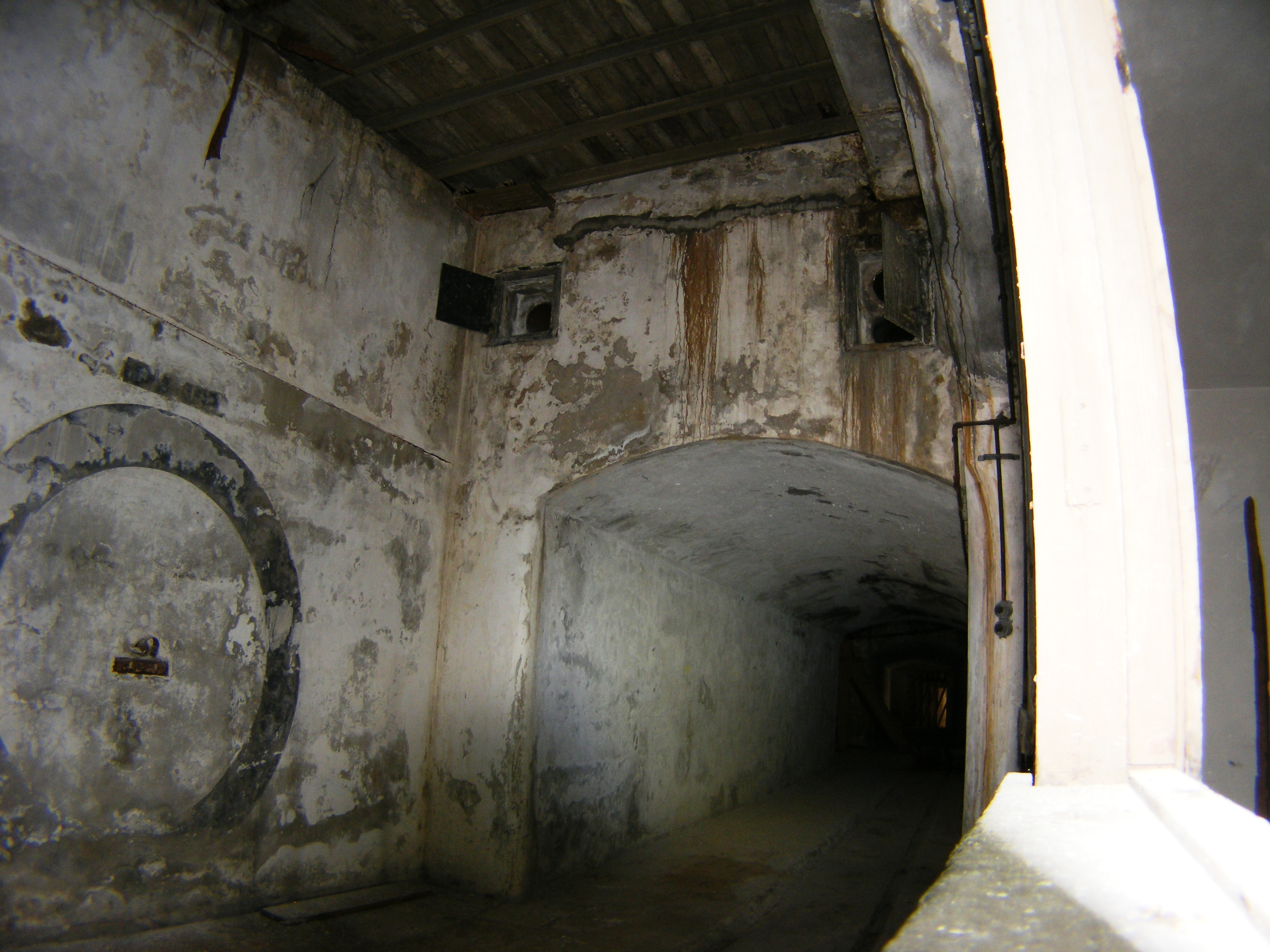
Inside a fort located on Chowder Bay, Clifton Gardens.
