= Beauty Point, New South Wales =

Beauty Point
- Interactive map of Beauty Point
- Coordinates: 33.81190°S 151.23830°E
- Country: Australia
- State: New South Wales
- City: Sydney
- LGA: Municipality of Mosman
- Location: 8 km (5.0 mi) north-east of Sydney CBD

Area
  - Total: 1.7 km^{2} (0.66 sq mi)

Population
  - Total: 501 (2006)
  - Density: 295/km^{2} (763/sq mi)
- Postcode: 2088
Localities around Beauty Point
The Spit
Beauty Point	Balmoral
Spit Junction	Georges Heights

Beauty Point is an urban locality in the suburb of Mosman in Sydney, New South Wales, Australia. It is located in the local government area of the Municipality of Mosman and is part of the Lower North Shore.

== History ==
Beauty Point takes its name from the piece of land protruding into the Middle Harbour, off Sydney Harbour. It was originally known as Billy Goat Point, but was renamed when it was subdivided to be sold.

== Schools ==
- Beauty Point Public School

== Churches ==
- St Thérèse of the Child Jesus Catholic Church
