= Garden Island Tunnel System =

Defense tunnel in Sydney, Australia

Garden Island Tunnel Complex
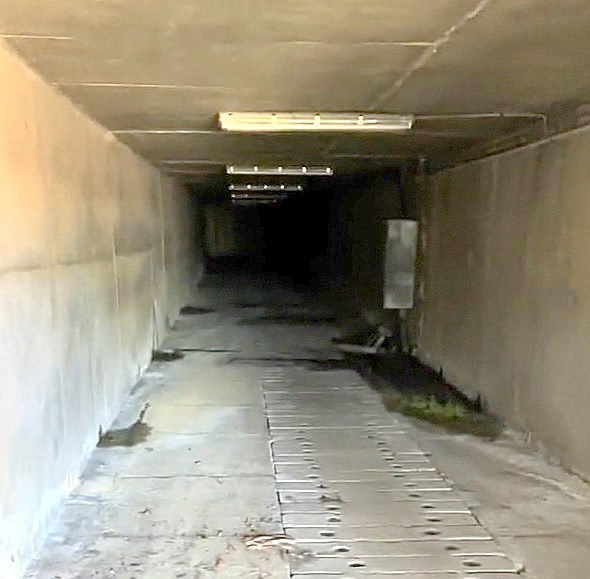
- Interactive map of Garden Island Tunnel Complex

Overview
- Other name: Garden Island Tunnels
- Location: Potts Point, New South Wales, Australia
- Coordinates: 33°51′35″S 151°13′43″E
- Status: Closed

Operation
- Work began: 11 December 1941
- Opened: 30 December 1941
- Operator: Royal Australian Navy

Technical
- Length: 650 m (2,130 ft)
- Tunnel clearance: 6 m (19 ft 8 in)
- Width: 5 m (16 ft 5 in)–7 m (23 ft 0 in)

The Garden Island Tunnel System, also known as Garden Island tunnels, Garden Island Tunnel Complex and Potts Point Tunnels, is a former tunnel warfare system in Garden Island, Sydney, Australia. Used in World War II by the Royal Australian Navy in 1941, the tunnels were dug from sandstone beneath Potts Point after the Japanese attacked Pearl Harbor, to shelter the men working at the naval base from air raids. Some of the tunnels feature names such as Petticoat Lane (named after London's landmark), North-West Passage and Lambeth Walk.

The tunnel system featured a power station, a command centre, offices and air raid shelters. Today, the tunnels and chambers are used for electrical wiring and communications.

== Construction ==
Four days after the Japanese air-raided Pearl Harbor on 7 December 1941, excavation began on the tunnels in Potts Point. The tunnel system was approved at an estimated cost of £15,150. After Sydney's shelling in June 1942, this pushed the exigent to excavate the five interlinked tunnels and multiple chambers underneath the base's northern point. A second tunnel system that runs all the way to Kings Cross exists, but little is known about it.

The Garden Island tunnels are perfectly straight, resembling a wild west mine, and concrete-lined with dented cuts into the rock for stretcher-bearing, casualty clearing stations, backup generators, telephone exchange, bathrooms and toilet facilities, some of which are located in the northernmost bunker. Other tunnels were constructed to store pumping valves at the Captain Cook Graving Dock.

== World War II ==
In early 1941, former prime minister of Australia and minister for the navy, Billy Hughes, stated that he did not want to alarm people by having them think Sydney was about to be bombarded. Hughes organized over a hundred of brodie helmets for the air raid officers and as well as training them in case if a chemical warfare were to occur. A pit constructed in the 1800s would have been used to store provisions if the island were to be sieged.

In December 1941, due to concerns that an aerial attack on Sydney could follow the Pearl Harbor bombing, the five tunnels were constructed to provide an airstrike shelter for the 2,500 waterfront staff at Garden Island Naval Base, in case the Royal Australian Navy base that lies there were attacked. The tunnel system would have been able to protect the workers on Garden Island from 70 tons of bombs dropped within 24 hours. Though the tunnels did not provide room for the public population, as civilians could have sought cover in the proximate railway stations of Sydney. The tunnels were also used to transport guns and ammunition from one side of the island to the other side.

The demand for protection from air attack became more serious in 1942, when Japan occupied Singapore on 15 February, and attacked Darwin on 19 February, and eventually, on 31 May, when three Japanese midget submarines entered and attacked the Sydney Harbour.

=== Post-war ===
In the 1960s, there still existed some tables, papers on walls and old telephones, but the tunnel complex became abandoned and the roof timber set either decayed or it got consumed by termites. In the 1970s, the tunnels were renovated with new steel roof supports and concrete after the fleecy sandstone walls and timber struts became weathered. Today, the tunnels are primarily used for storage and to provide fuel and communication lines at the naval base.

== Upgrade ==
As of October 2023, the defense base in the tunnels is going through a half-a-billion dollar, three-year infrastructure upgrade. The warship wharves have been adjusted, in addition to replacement of a fuel tank for the ships and improvement to the island's structure that includes fuel, electricity, sewerage and water, which run through the tunnels. A part of Petticoat Lane, which was used to insulate boilers and pipage on ships, is gated off with a warning sign that indicates the presence of asbestos.

== See also ==
- Bradleys Head Fortification Complex
- Georges Head Battery
- Middle Head Fortifications
- Sydney Harbour defences
