= Spit Junction =

Coordinates: 33°49′36″S 151°14′30″E

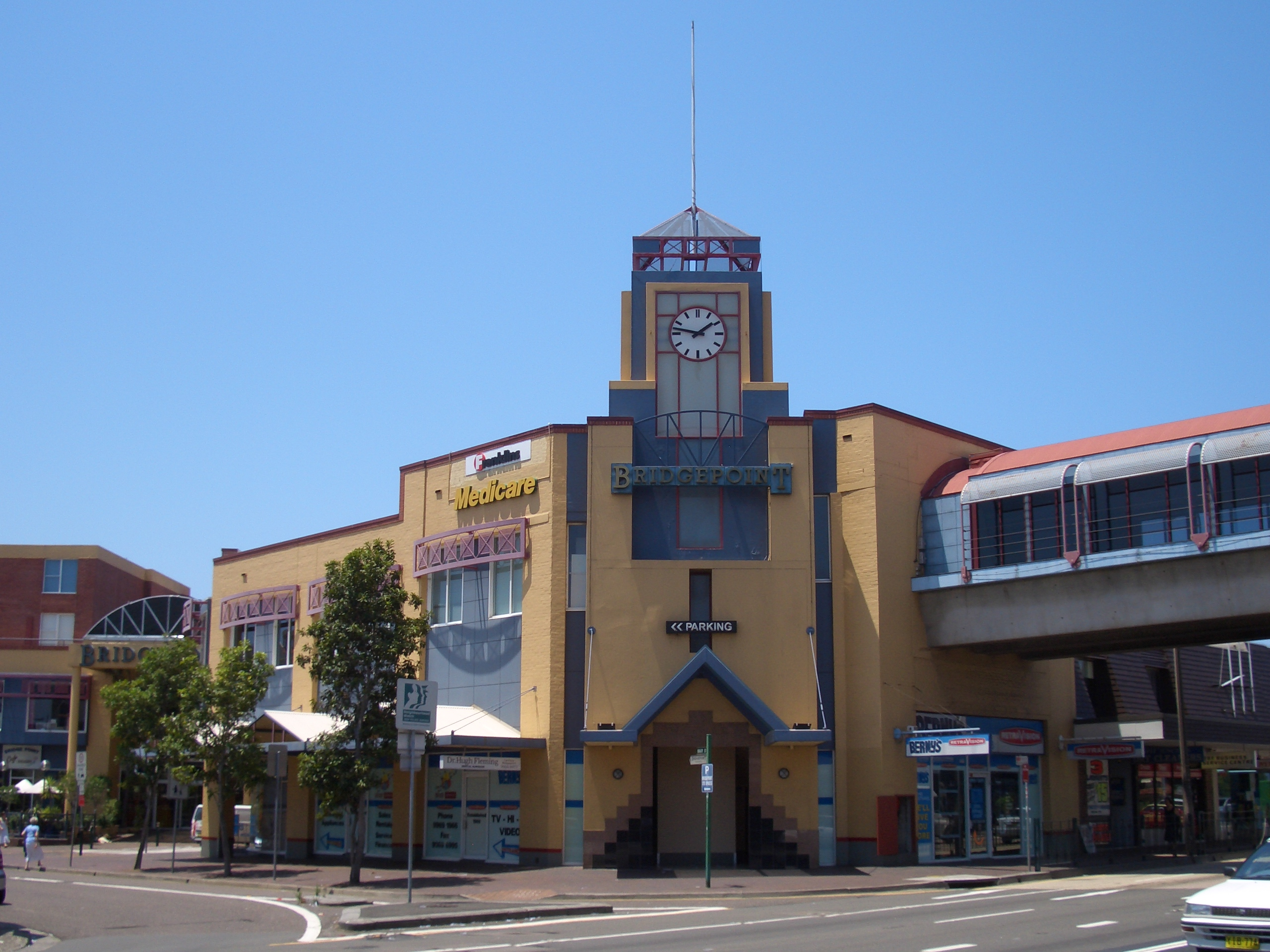
- Bridgepoint shopping centre
- Interactive map of Spit Junction
- Country: Australia
- State: New South Wales
- City: Sydney
- LGA: Municipality of Mosman
- Location: 9 km (5.6 mi) north-east of Sydney CBD
- Postcode: 2088
Localities around Spit Junction
	The Spit
Beauty Point	Spit Junction	Balmoral
		Georges Heights

Spit Junction is an urban locality in the suburb of Mosman in Sydney, New South Wales, Australia. Spit Junction is in the local government area of the Municipality of Mosman and is part of the Lower North Shore.

== History ==
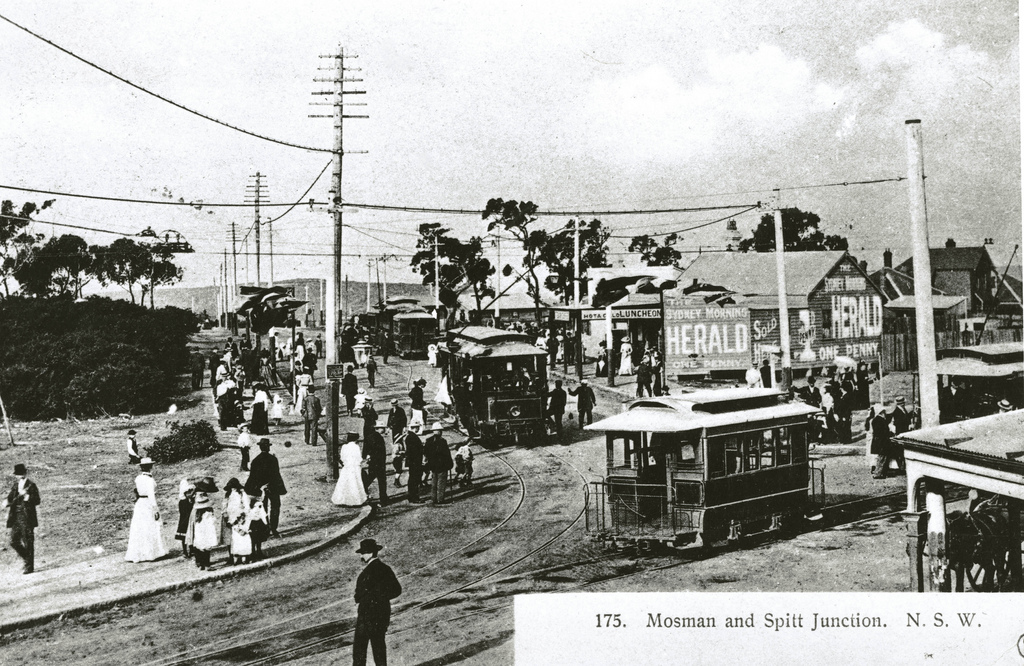
Opening ceremony for the Spit Junction tram line 3 November 1900

E. and W. E. Brady bought 3.6 hectares (9 acres) in this area in 1855 and it became a bush racetrack until the area was subdivided in 1902. The area had been known as Trafalgar Square, from the name of a block of shops built at the corner of Spit Road and Military Road.

== Commercial area ==
Bridgepoint Shopping Centre is a small shopping mall located at Spit Junction. It features a supermarket, grocery shops, bookshop, gift shops, cafés, health practitioners, and offices.
