= Middle Harbour Syphon =

- Location within Sydney
- 33°48′26″S 151°15′07″E
- Location: Monash Crescent (East Side), Clontarf, Northern Beaches Council, New South Wales, Australia

History
- Built: 1922–1925

Site notes
- Architect(s): E. M. de Burgh, NSW Public Works Department
- Owner: Sydney Water

New South Wales Heritage Register
- Official name: Middle Harbour Syphon NSOOS; The Spit Syphon
- Type: State heritage (built)
- Designated: 15 November 2002
- Reference no.: 1628
- Type: Other - Utilities - Sewerage
- Category: Utilities - Sewerage
- Builders: Public Works Department

The Middle Harbour Syphon is a heritage-listed sewerage syphon located at Monash Crescent (East Side), Clontarf, Northern Beaches Council, New South Wales, Australia. It was designed by E. M. de Burgh, an engineer in the NSW Public Works Department and was built from 1922 to 1925 by the Department. The sewerage syphon is also known as the Middle Harbour Syphon NSOOS and The Spit Syphon. The property is owned by Sydney Water, an agency of the Government of New South Wales. The property was added to the New South Wales State Heritage Register on 15 November 2002.

== History ==
The Middle Harbour or Spit Syphon is a key component of the Northern Suburbs Ocean Outfall Sewer (NSOOS), which was the third major sewerage system to be built to service Sydney's rapidly growing wastewater needs. It is one of two large syphons located on the NSOOS being built between 1922 and 1925, the other being the Lane Cove Syphon (built 1916 to 1930). A third and much smaller syphon is located at Manly. The history of NSOOS is intricately linked to the earlier smaller council systems it replaced. In 1916 a scheme proposed by the NSW Public Works Department (PWD) was approved by Parliament. The scheme involved replacement of all sewage treatment plants on the North Shore (with the exception of Hornsby) by a large main sewer with several branches. It also involved an Ocean Outfall System for suburbs along the Milsons Point - Hornsby railway line. Construction of the sewer was carried out by the PWD from 1916 to 1928, then transferred to the Board, along with many staff members, to complete the remainder by 1930. Today, the system as a whole services areas as far west as Blacktown and bounded to the north by Narrabeen Lagoon, St Ives and Hornsby and to the south by Sydney Harbour, Lidcombe, Yagoona and Guildford.

In constructing the NSOOS the engineers were faced with the problem of taking the line across Middle Harbour. The need to maintain a clear passage for navigation ruled out bridging, and the depth to solid sandstone beneath the harbour bed made tunnelling impracticable. It was therefore decided to carry the sewer across in two parallel pipelines laid on the bed of the harbour where it was sufficiently deep not to interfere with shipping, and to operate it as an inverted syphon. Major syphons had already been completed on the SWSOOS, near the present Kingsford-Smith Airport.

== Description ==
The Middle Harbour Syphon crosses Middle Harbour at The Spit, between Parriwi Point and Clontarf Flat. The syphon consists of two large concrete towers (accesshouses) carefully designed with an Egyptian architectural influence, and an above-ground concrete aqueduct on the Clontarf Flat. The accesshouses are linked by two parallel 1.8-metre (5 ft 11 in) diameter concrete pipes laid on the harbour bed. The total length of piping is 358 metres (1,175 ft), and the greatest depth below water level is 22 metres (72 ft). The system operates as a pressure tunnel or inverted syphon, with the east end being slightly lower on the opposing shore than the western end. The syphon carries the entire flow of NSOOS from suburbs west of Middle Harbour. The twin pipelines encompass 20 reinforced concrete pipes, made in sections of 30.5m long and weighing 140 tonnes (150 short tons). Groups of concrete piles were driven into the sand of the harbour bed to support these pipes. The valve chambers contain apparatus for handling the sewage flow via either or both of the pipelines. For many years these "legs" were used alternatively, but in recent years the flow has increased so as to require the continuous use of both pipes.

Substantially intact.

=== Modifications and dates ===
A renovation program is presently underway at the accesshouses, principally to renew corroded metal fittings and to fit steel hatches over the inlet and outlets to prevent the escape of offensive odours.

== Heritage listing ==
As at 15 November 2001, the Middle Harbour Syphon was a rare item of considerable cultural heritage significance. The syphon is a key component of the Northern Suburbs Ocean Outfall Sewer (NSOOS), the third major sewerage system to be built to service Sydney's growing wastewater needs. The syphon is one of three syphons associated with this sewerage system, the others being the Lane Cove Syphon and the Queenscliff Syphon located at Manly. The Lane Cove Syphon and The Middle Harbour Syphon are similar in size while the Manly Syphon is much smaller.

It was built between 1922 and 1925 and provides an excellent example of the skills of engineers of the time in constructing major public works. It is also possibly the best example in the state of an inverted syphon on such a scale. The syphon remains a vital part of Sydney's sewerage system, it is still in first rate condition and has been in constant use since its completion. The two access houses are well known foreshore landmarks and are of architectural interest because of their Art Deco style which displays influence of Egyptian architecture. The northern side of the syphon also consists of an aqueduct which runs along Clontarf Reserve.

Middle Harbour Syphon was listed on the New South Wales State Heritage Register on 15 November 2002 having satisfied the following criteria.

The place is important in demonstrating the course, or pattern, of cultural or natural history in New South Wales.

The Middle Harbour Syphon is one of the three syphons associated with NSOOS and one of two syphgons of its size, the other being the Lane Cove Syphon. Both are significant as major components of NSOOS, which provides sewerage services to a considerable portion of Sydney.

The place is important in demonstrating aesthetic characteristics and/or a high degree of creative or technical achievement in New South Wales.

Notable for the two imposing accesshouse structures which are prominent and well known foreshore landmarks. The two structures are also of architectural interest as early examples of the Art Deco style, displaying influence of Egyptian architecture. In addition the accesshouse on the east side has an imposing flight of stairs facing the water, its platform provides an excellent view of much of the harbour, and has been used as a command post by the Army during water transport exercises.

The place has a strong or special association with a particular community or cultural group in New South Wales for social, cultural or spiritual reasons.

The system is a vital part of Sydney's sewage system and is listed with the National Trust of Australia (NSW). The Middle Harbour Syphon is a key component of the Northern Suburbs Ocean Outfall Sewer (NSOOS), providing for the crossing of Middle Harbour at The Spit. The NSOOS, including the syphon, is a further example of the community's hidden heritage associated with public health and the quality of life.

The place has potential to yield information that will contribute to an understanding of the cultural or natural history of New South Wales.

Possibly the best example in the state of an inverted syphon on such a scale. Also an excellent example of major engineering public works techniques of the 1920s. Innovative engineering techniques were required so that the sewer line was able to cross Middle Harbour. The Navy crane TITAN was used to carry out the work on the syphon.

The place possesses uncommon, rare or endangered aspects of the cultural or natural history of New South Wales.

The Middle Harbour Syphon is one of two large syphons associated with the NSOOS. The associated superstructures are of architectural significance displaying Art Deco style which is quite rare within the current Sydney Water system.

The place is important in demonstrating the principal characteristics of a class of cultural or natural places/environments in New South Wales.

Uses a syphon method which is typical of resolving particular gully, valley or river crossings.
