= Georges Heights =

Coordinates: 33°49′55″S 151°15′32″E

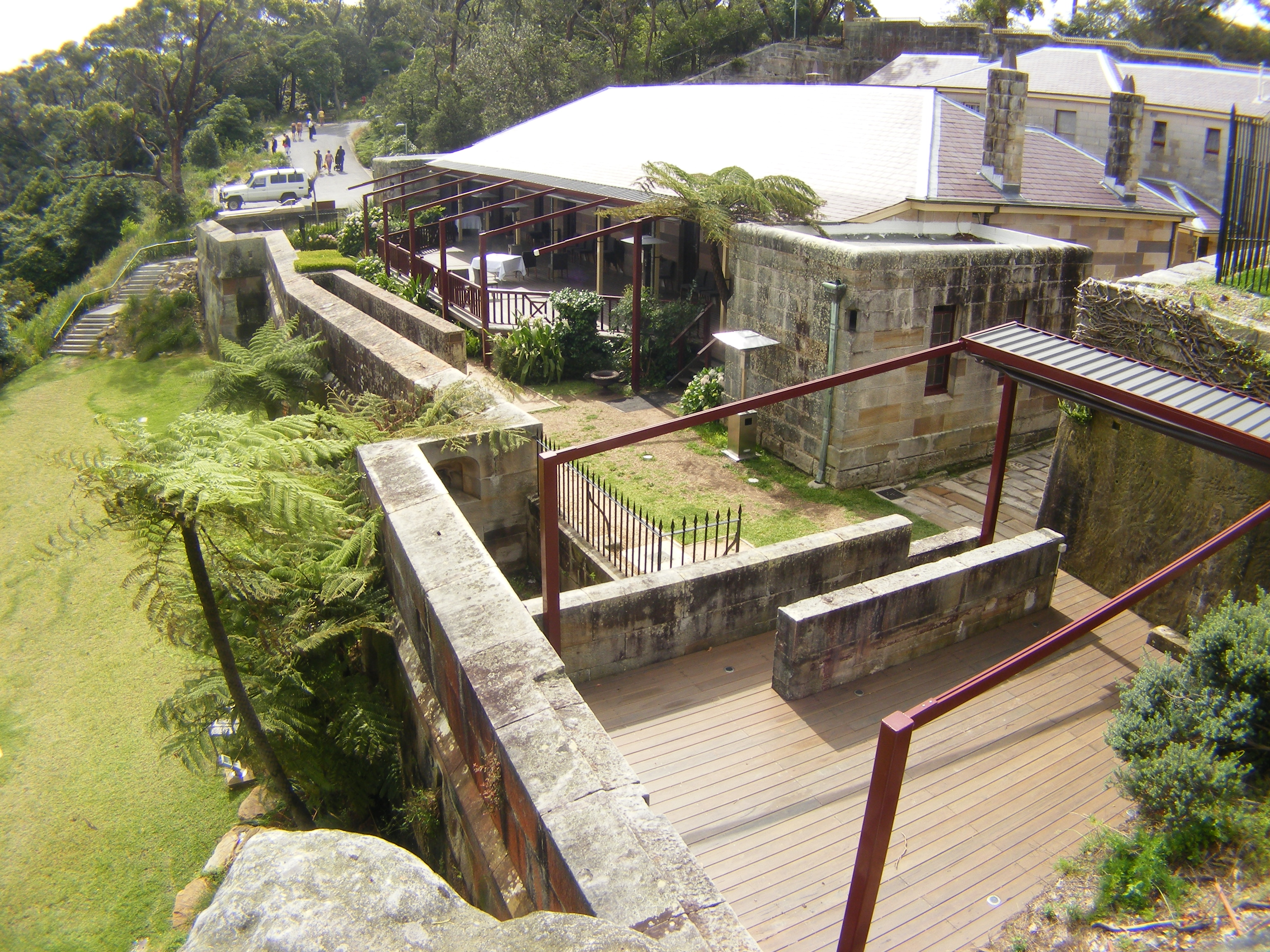
- Former officers residence and barrack, now a restaurant
- Interactive map of Georges Heights
- Country: Australia
- State: New South Wales
- City: Sydney
- LGA: Municipality of Mosman
- Location: 8 km (5.0 mi) north-east of Sydney CBD
- Postcode: 2088
Localities around Georges Heights
	Balmoral
Spit Junction	Georges Heights
Clifton Gardens

Georges Heights is an urban locality in the suburb of Mosman, adjoining Sydney, in the state of New South Wales, Australia. Georges Heights is located in the local government area of the Municipality of Mosman and is part of the Lower North Shore.

== History ==
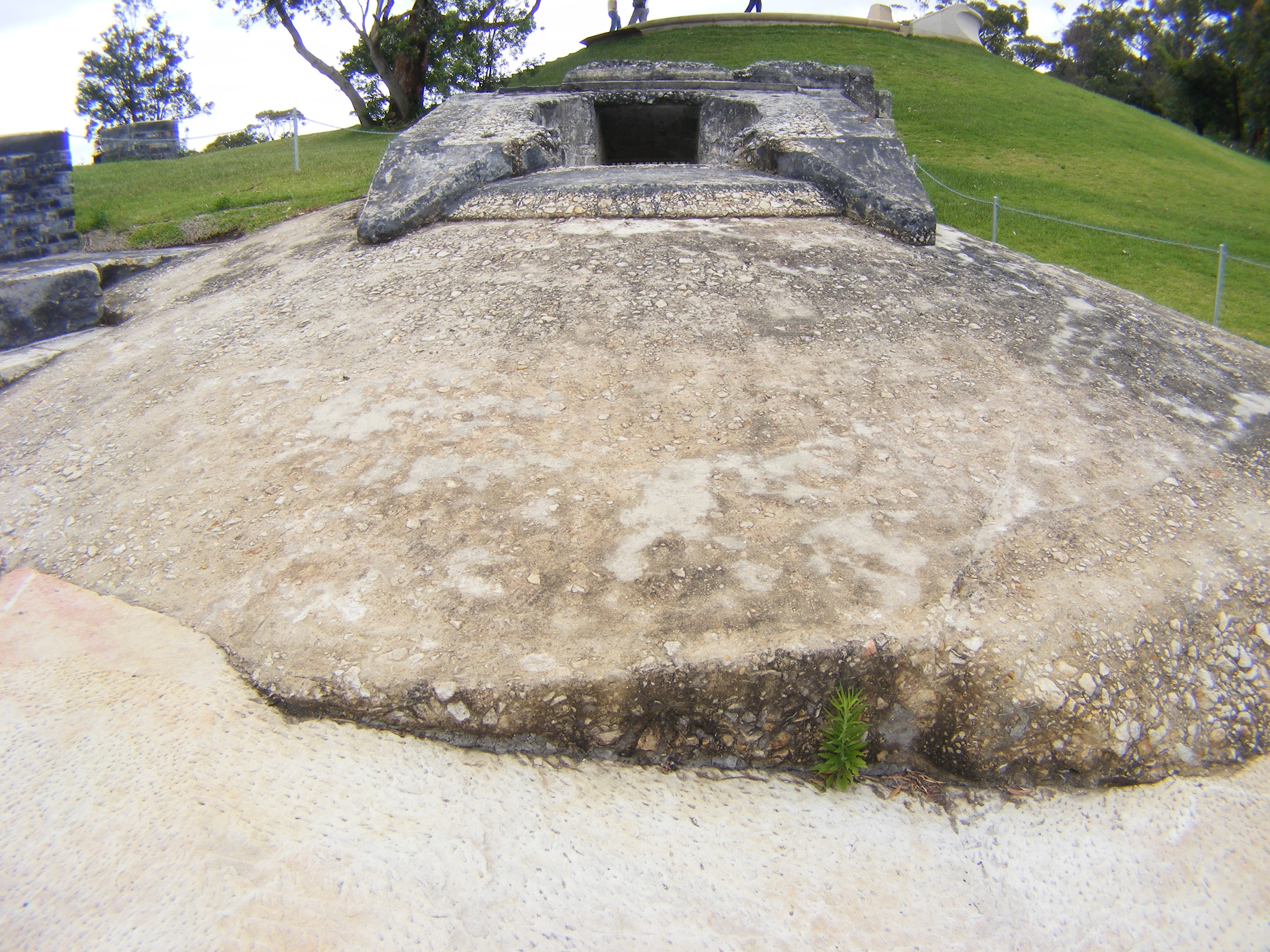
Submarine mine observing station behind the gun emplacements at Georges Heights

Georges Heights was named after King George III, who reigned from 1760 to 1820, which was during the time that the First Fleet left Portsmouth, England in 1788 and arrived in what is now Sydney Harbour.

The Georges Head Battery located in Georges Heights was constructed in 1871. A naval depot stands on the eastern side of Chowder Bay.

== Heritage listings ==
Georges Heights has a number of heritage-listed sites, including:

- Chowder Bay Road: Georges Head Military Fortifications
