= Cremorne Gardens, Sydney =

Cremorne Gardens was a pleasure garden established in Sydney in 1856. The Gardens were not successful and closed in 1862. Their legacy today is the names of two local suburbs.

== History ==
J.R. Clarke and his partner Charles H. Woolcott rented part of the peninsula leading to Robertson Point in 1856 from James Milson, a prominent land holder in Northern Sydney. Woolcott was a former Town Clerk of the City of Sydney and resident of Ivycliff at Berrys Bay. Clarke and Woolcott then turned the rented land into a pleasure garden called Cremorne Gardens, after a similar pleasure garden in London.

The Gardens opened on 24 March 1856, with a display of fireworks, three years after James Ellis reestablished his original Cremorne Gardens in Melbourne from London. Other amusements, including merry-go-rounds, band music, dancing, archery, quoits and refreshments, were offered for a 2 shillings admission charge which included the ferry fare from Circular Quay. In May, the proprietors published their new pricing strategy, of a flat 1 shilling fee, again, including the ferry. They claimed this was cheaper than comparable pleasure gardens.

The Gardens were not a success and closed after six years, in 1862.

== Legacy ==
The Sydney Cremorne Gardens were one of a number which were developed around Australia based on the London original, some lasting well into the 20th Century, such as the Cremorne Theatre, Brisbane.

Later, when James Milson developed land behind Robertson Point, it was given the name Cremorne Point, after the Gardens. Today, the name of the suburb is often used in place of Robertson Point for the point itself. Cremorne, a suburb further to the north, and Cremorne Junction, a locality within the suburb, also take their names from the Gardens.
