= Bradleys Head Light =

Lighthouse in New South Wales, Australia

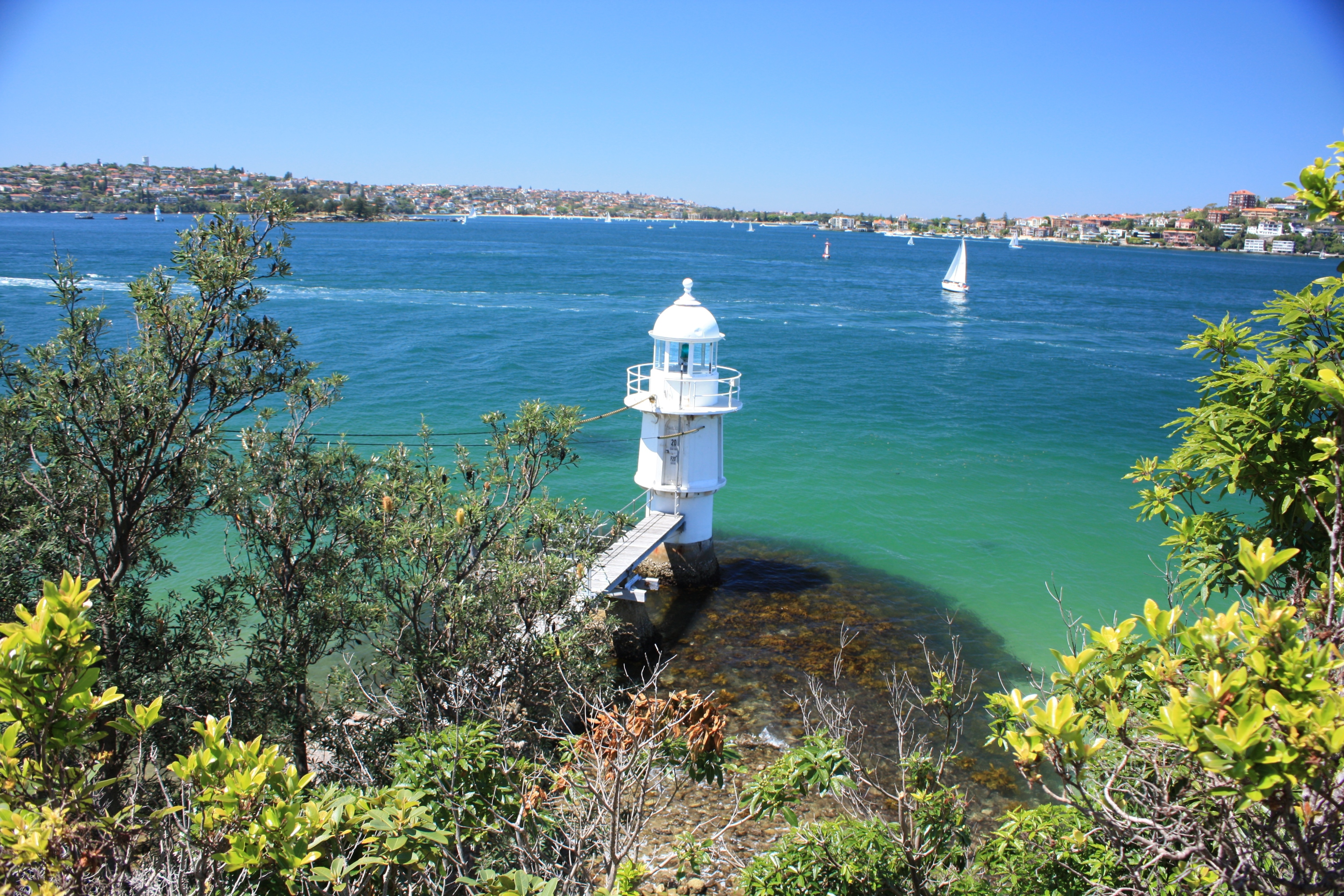
- Bradleys Head Light in 2008
- Location: Bradleys Head, Port Jackson, Sydney, New South Wales, Australia
- Coordinates: 33.853487°S 151.246664°E

Tower
- Constructed: 1905
- Foundation: Rock
- Construction: Concrete tower
- Height: 6.1 metres (20 ft)
- Shape: Cylindrical tower with balcony and lantern
- Markings: White tower and lantern
- Operator: Sydney Ports Corporation (light); NSW National Parks and Wildlife Service (site)
- Heritage: Heritage Act — State Heritage Register
- Fog signal: blast every 30s (bl. 10s, si. 4s, bl. 4s, si. 4s, bl. 4s, si. 4s)

Light
- Focal height: 6.7 metres (22 ft)
- Range: 11 kilometres (6 nmi)
- Characteristic: Oc. G 3s.

New South Wales Heritage Register
- Official name: Bradleys Head Light Tower
- Type: State heritage (built)
- Designated: 18 April 2000
- Reference no.: 1430
- Type: Lighthouse Tower
- Category: Transport – Water

The Bradleys Head Light is an active heritage-listed lighthouse at Bradleys Head, a headland protruding from the north shore of Sydney Harbour in the suburb of Mosman, New South Wales, Australia. It is the sibling of Robertson Point Light. The site is owned and managed as part of the Sydney Harbour National Park by the NSW National Parks and Wildlife Service, an agency of the Government of New South Wales; while the light is managed and operated by Sydney Ports Corporation. It was added to the New South Wales State Heritage Register on 18 April 2000.

== History ==
The light was introduced in 1905 as a navigation marker and warning light to ships entering and leaving the harbour. A fog siren was added in 1906 and modified in 1936. The concrete structure was introduced in 1949.

The tower was listed on the New South Wales State Heritage Register on 18 April 2000.

== Description ==
The tower is constructed of timber and concrete. The lighthouse design is similar to the 1934 design at Robertson's Point. Its light characteristic is occulting green light with a cycle of three seconds (Oc.G. 3s), the same as Robertson Point Light. It is mounted on a rock and connected to the shore by a footbridge.

== Visiting ==
The site is open and accessible to the public, but the tower itself is closed. Parking is available at the end of Bradleys Head Road. Close to the lighthouse is the foremast of the cruiser HMAS Sydney, a monument for Australian sailors killed at war.

== Gallery ==
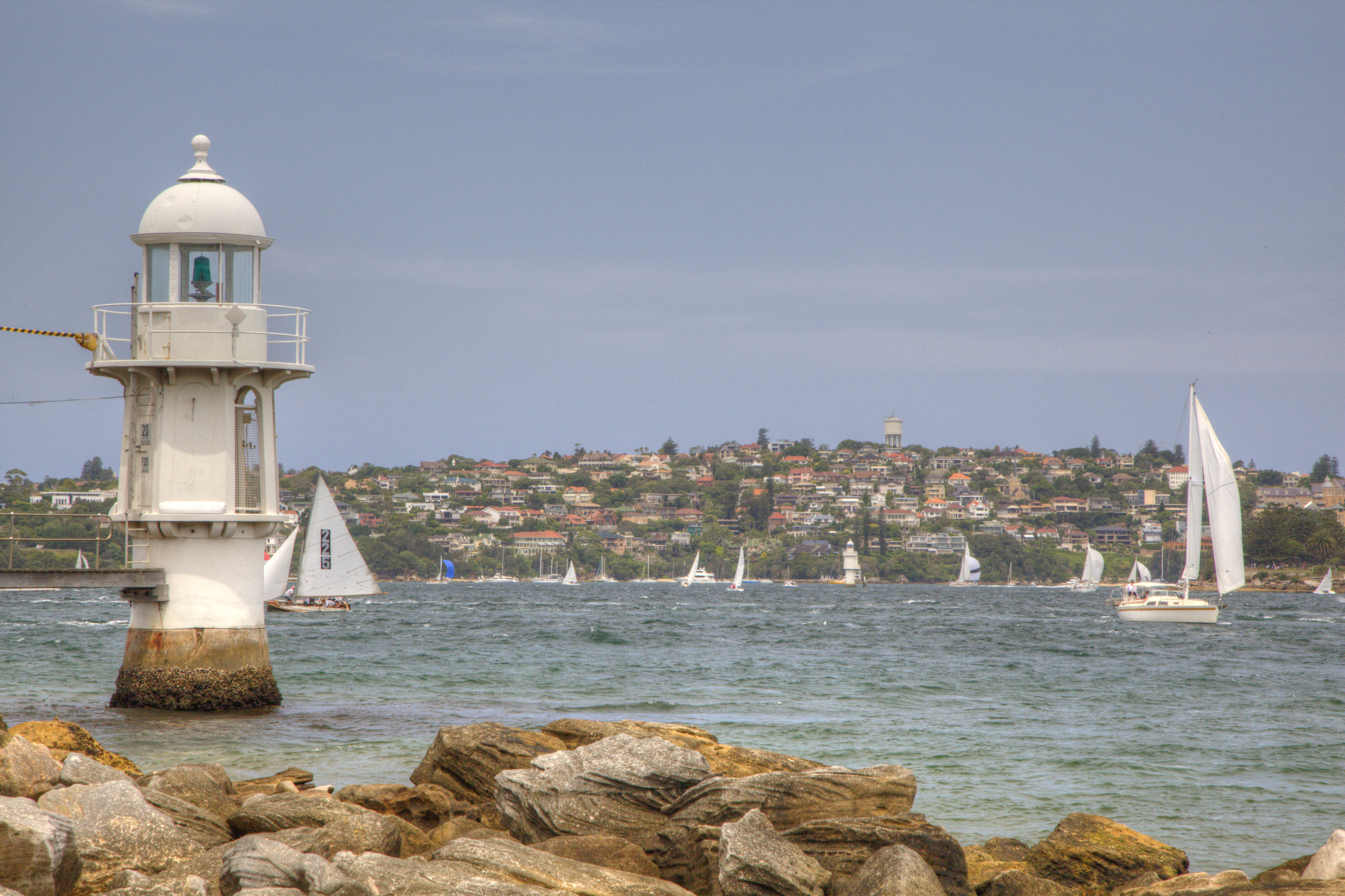
Bradleys Head Light at low-tide, showing the foundation

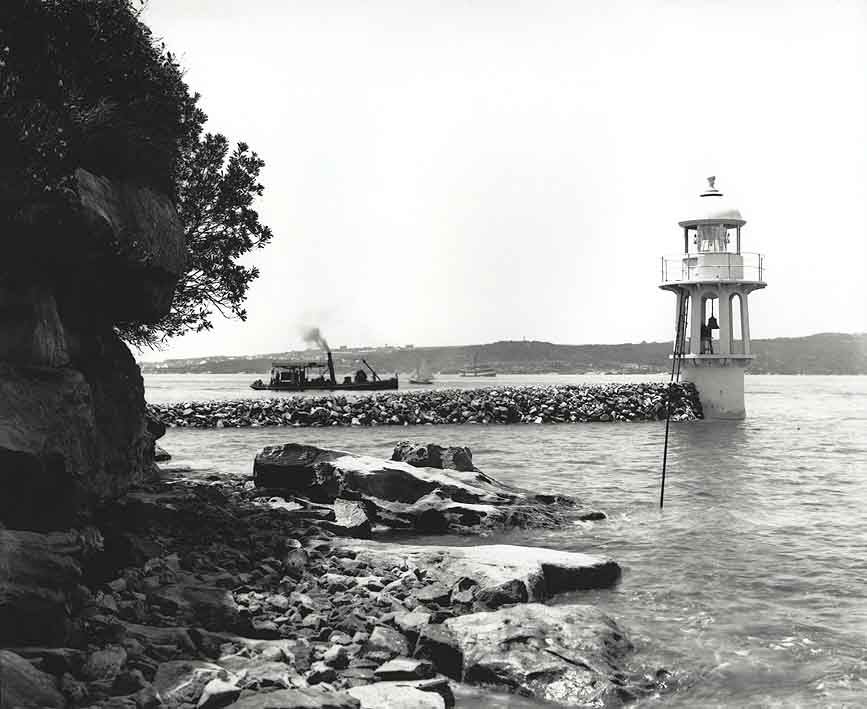
Historic view of Bradleys Head Lighthouse showing the Sydney Harbour Trust workboat Aurora in the background. Note the different light source and the bell

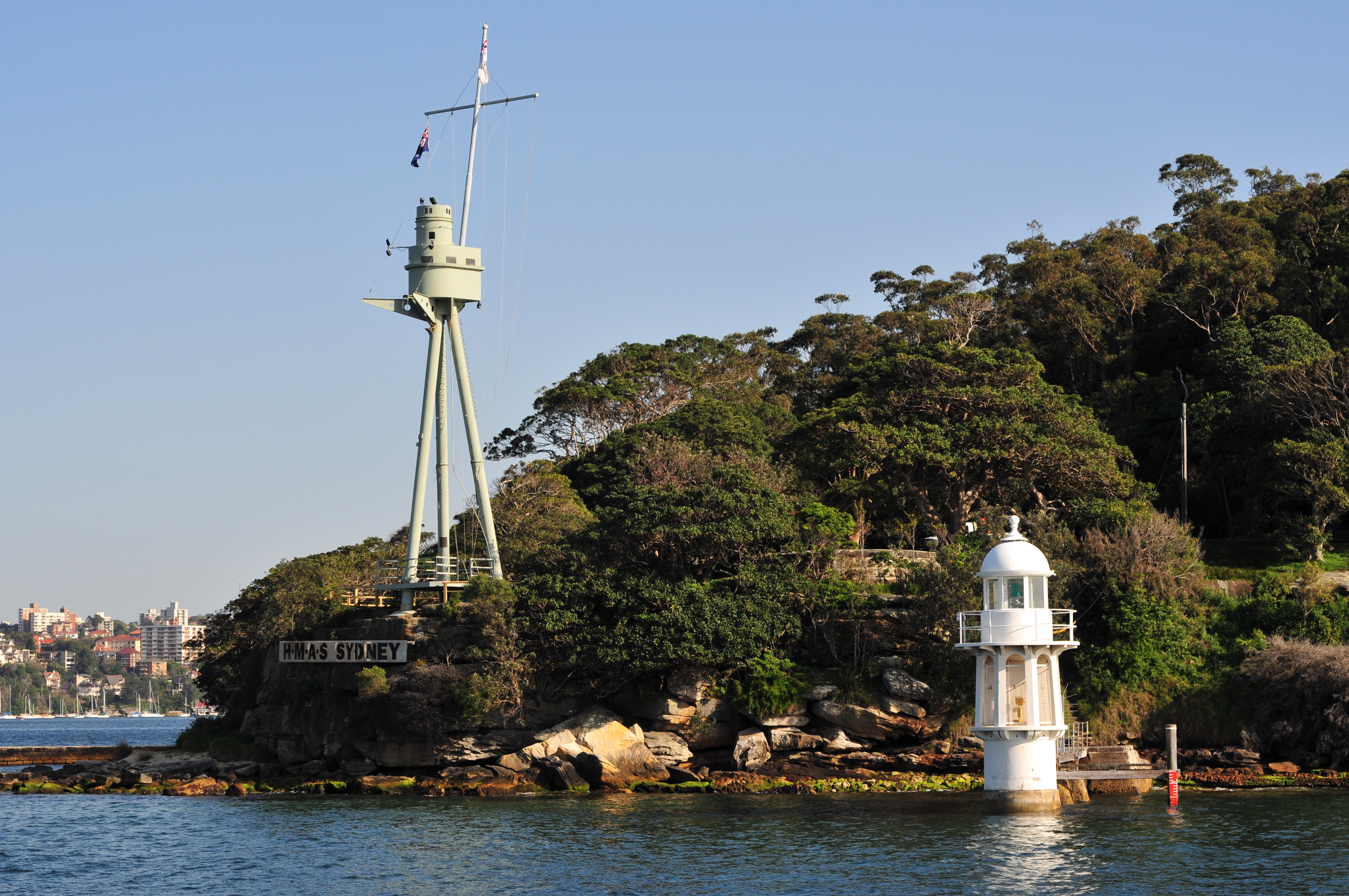
Bradleys Head Light on the right. Foremast of HMAS Sydney on left

== See also ==
- List of lighthouses in Australia
