= John Neil McCallum =

John Neil McCallum (1872 – 1957) was an organist, entertainment manager, entrepreneur and theatre owner in Brisbane in the first half of the twentieth century. He was the initial manager of the Cremorne Theatre, Brisbane from 1911 and later its owner from 1916 until its destruction by fire in 1954. He is best remembered today as the father of John McCallum (actor) (1918-2010) a well known Australian actor, film star, and later television producer.
