= Bradleys Head =

Headland in Sydney, New South Wales, Australia

Coordinates: 33°51′9″S 151°14′45″E

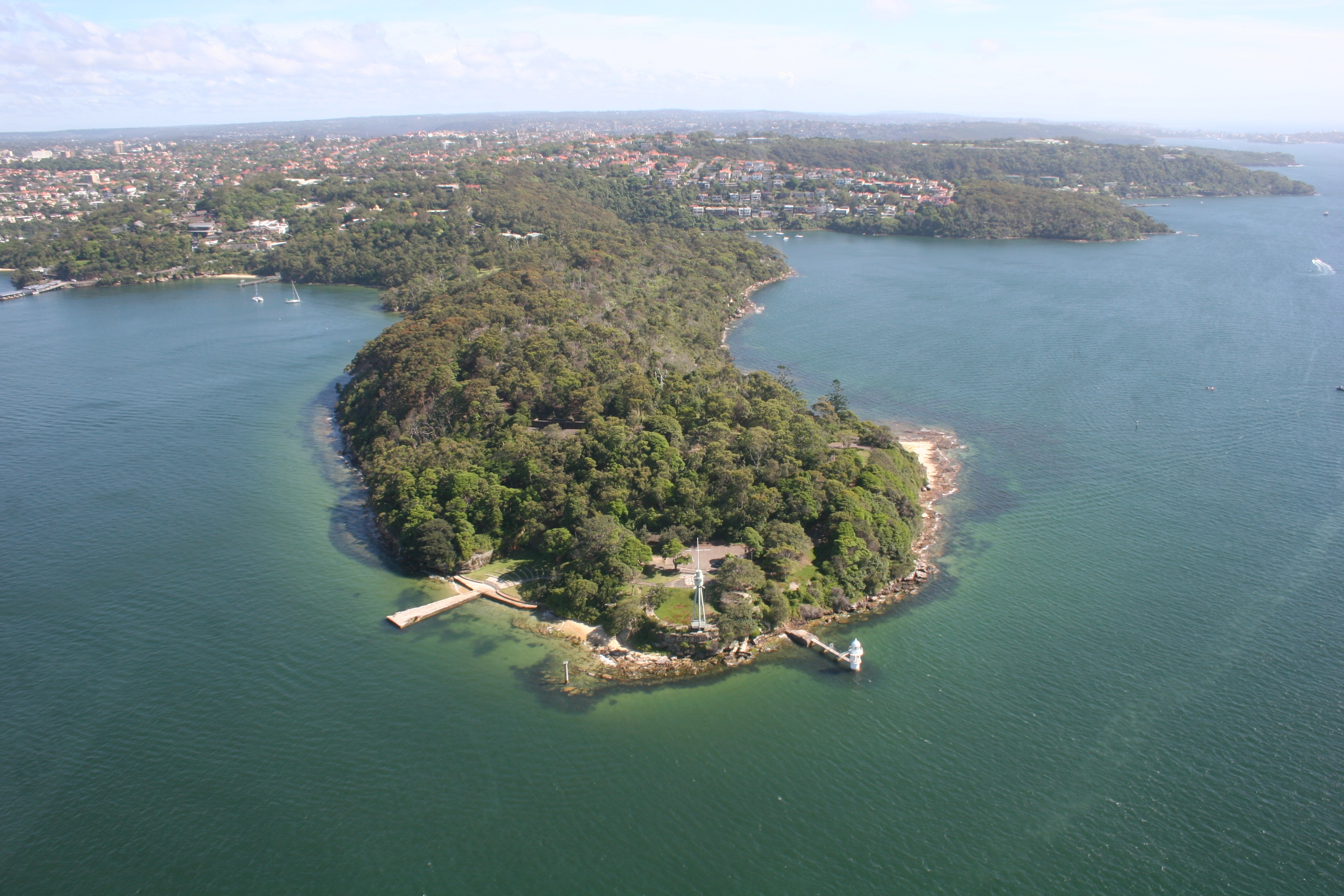
Aerial view of Bradleys Head

Bradleys Head is a headland protruding from the north shore of Sydney Harbour, within the metropolitan area of Sydney, New South Wales, Australia. It is named after the First Fleet naval officer William Bradley. The original Aboriginal inhabitants, who belonged to the Borogegal clan of the Eora nation, knew Bradleys Head as Borogegy, Booraghee, Booragy or Burrogy. On the headland is an active lighthouse, Bradleys Head Light, constructed in 1905.

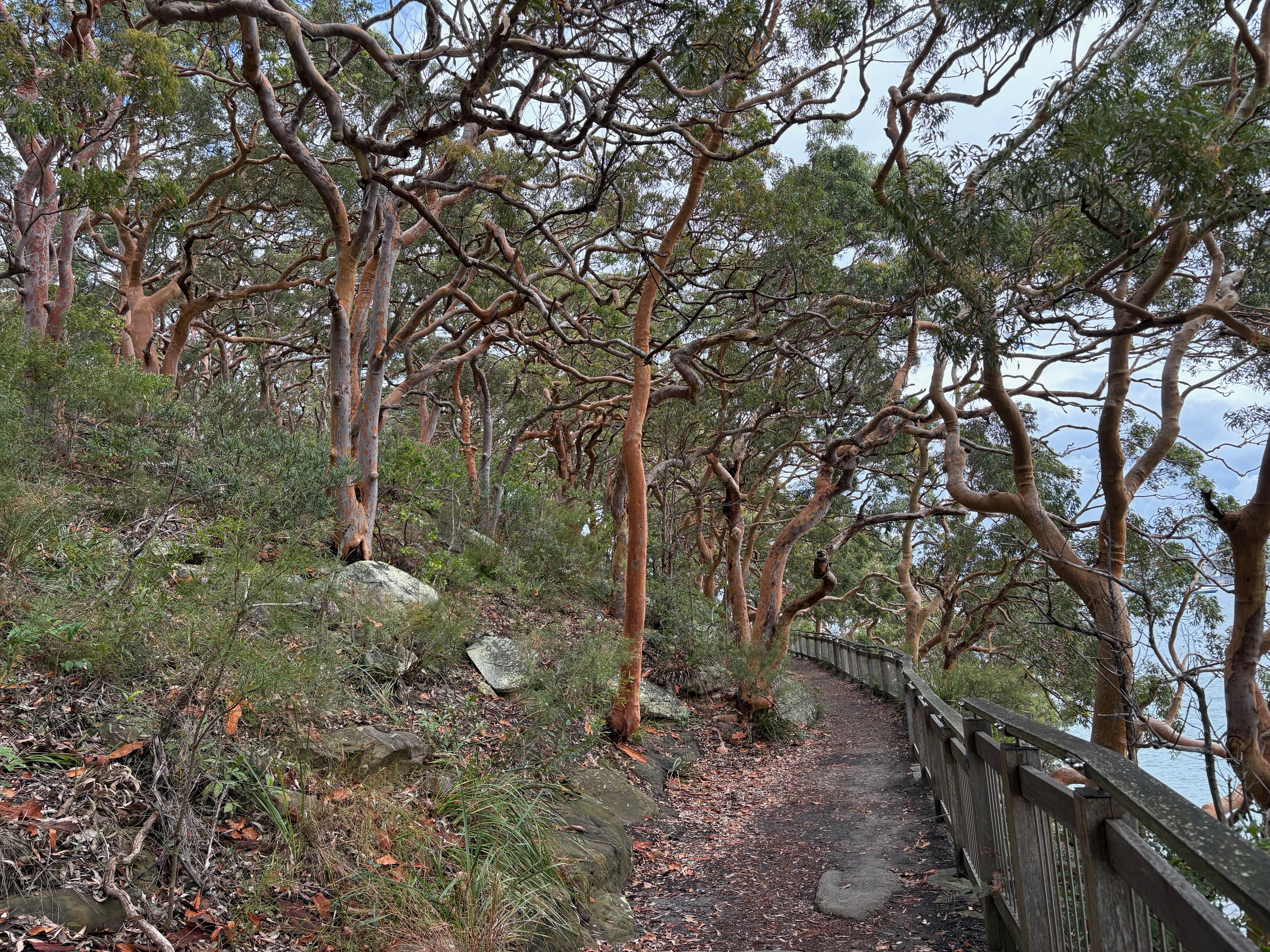
Path to Bradleys Head

Bradleys Head is now a unit of the Sydney Harbour National Park and managed by the National Parks and Wildlife Service.

== History ==
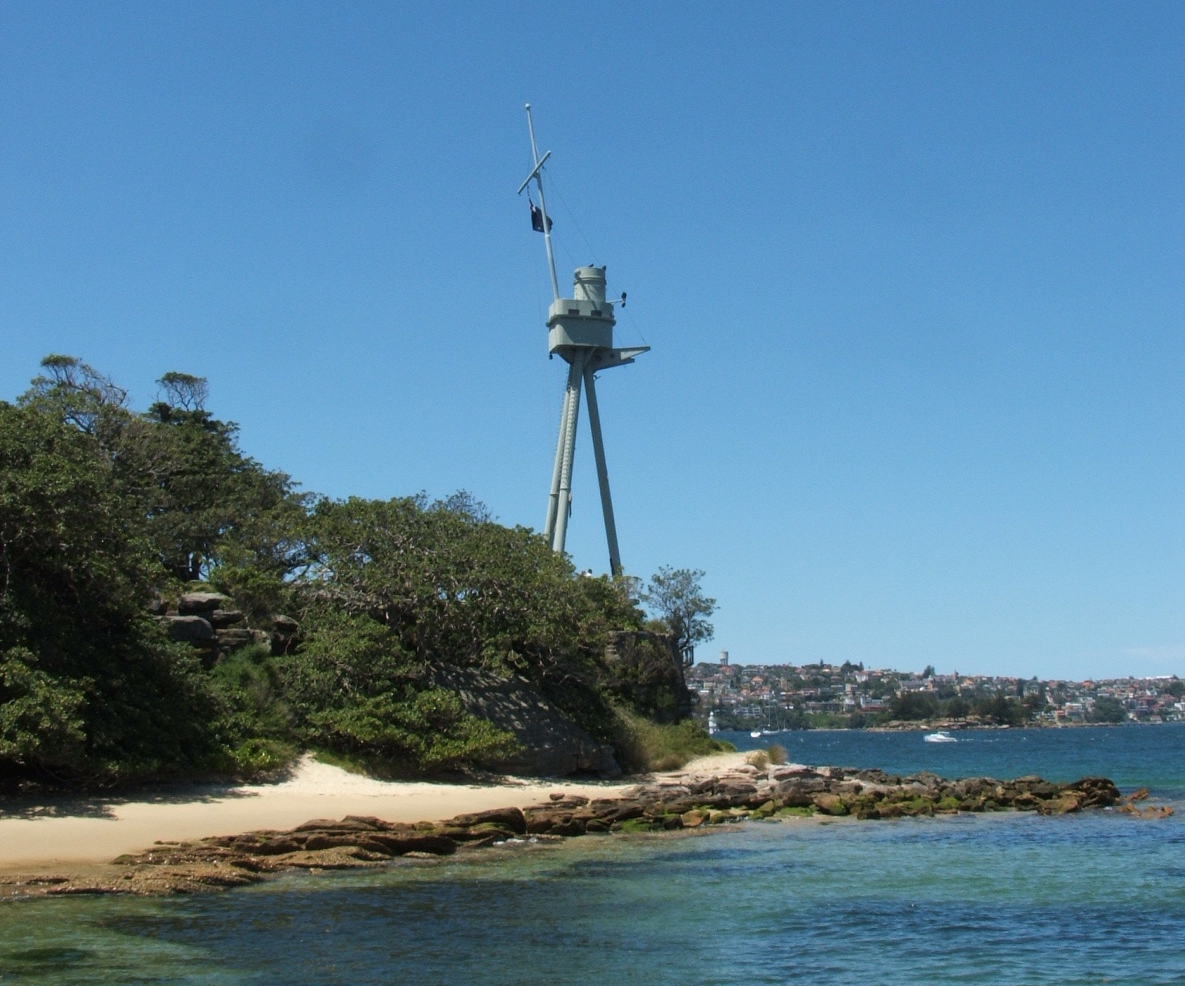
Mast of HMAS Sydney

The foremast of the cruiser HMAS Sydney, renowned for taking part in the Royal Australian Navy's first ship-against-ship engagement in World War I, is mounted on the headland as a memorial to that battle. In June 2000 the mast was rededicated as a monument to all Australian ships and sailors lost in conflict.

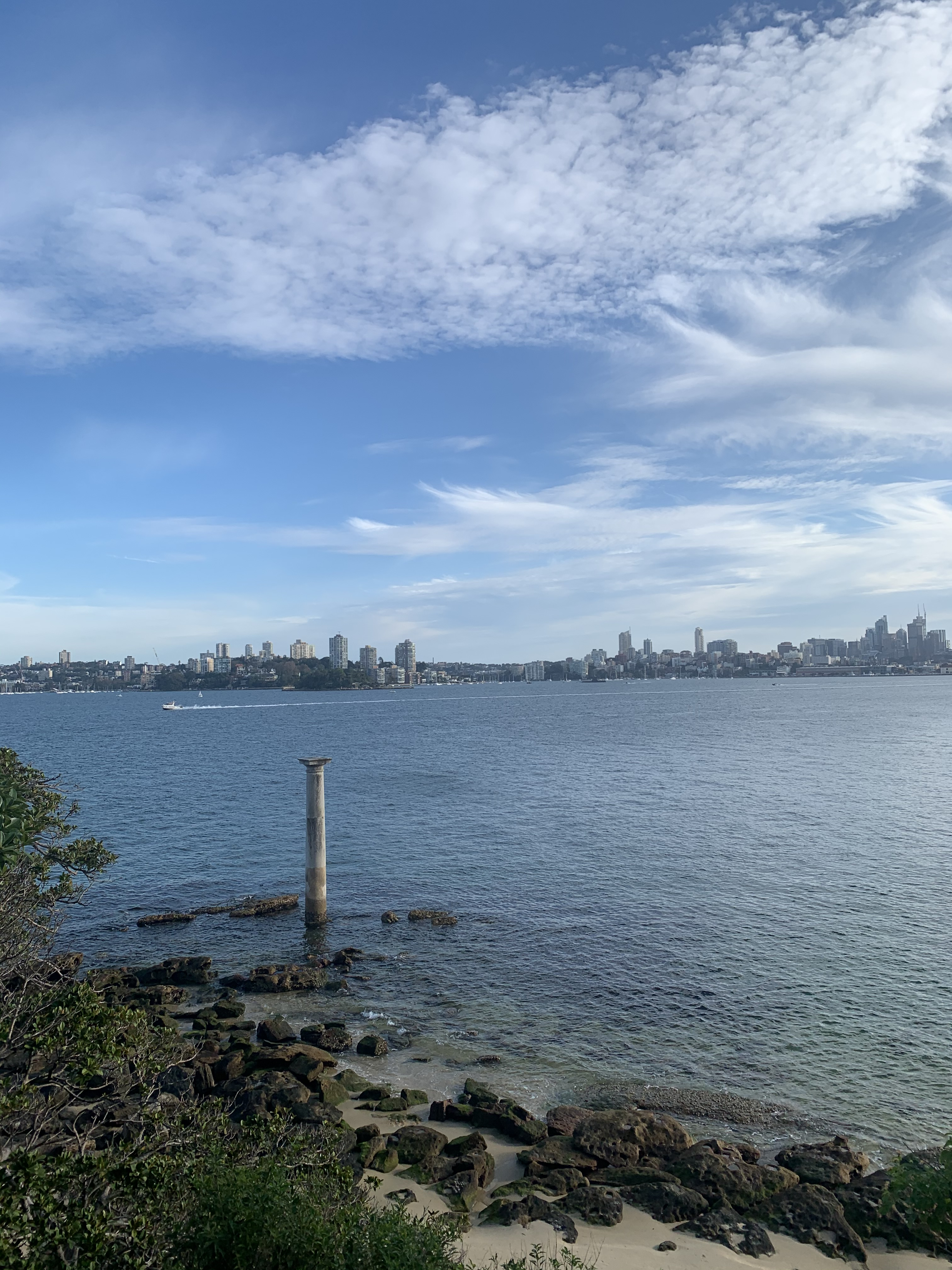
Doric stone column on rock platform

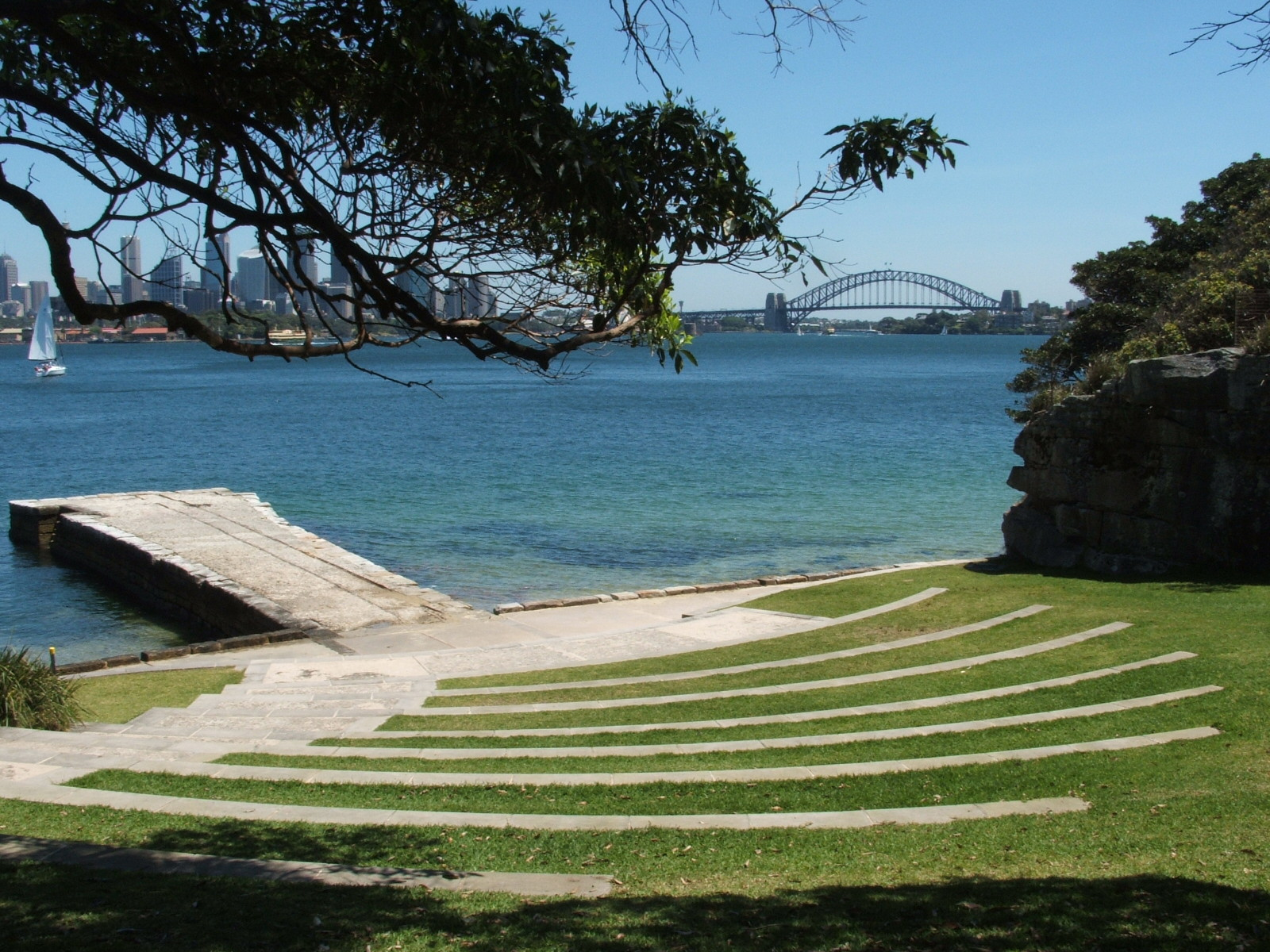
Location of the antagonist's Sydney residence in Mission: Impossible 2. The house itself has been removed.

Sitting on the rock platform off the headland is a Doric stone column. It is one of six that were taken from the demolished Sydney Post Office and placed in positions in Sydney. In conjunction with the tower off Fort Denison, it was used for speed trials of vessels in Sydney Harbour. Owing to increased congestion on the harbour, it is no longer used by the Maritime Services Board for this purpose. (Another of the columns can be seen in the Mount Street Plaza, North Sydney.)

The heritage-listed Bradleys Head Light, completed in 1905, is located on the point of Bradley's Head Peninsula and used as a navigation marker and warning light to ships entering and leaving the harbour. The lighthouse is mounted on a rock and connected to shore by a footbridge.

Nearby Athol Bight was used from the end of World War 2 to the mid-1980s to store naval ships. The headland was used for shooting scenes for the film Mission: Impossible 2 (2000). A polystyrene house seen in the film was built there, then removed after shooting was completed.

== See also ==
- Bradleys Head Fortification Complex
- Clark Island
- Dobroyd Head
- Goat Island
- Middle Head
- Nielsen Park
- Rodd Island
- Shark Island
- Sydney Heads
