= Cremorne Theatre =

Former theatre in South Brisbane

- Cremorne Gardens; Cremorne Cinema
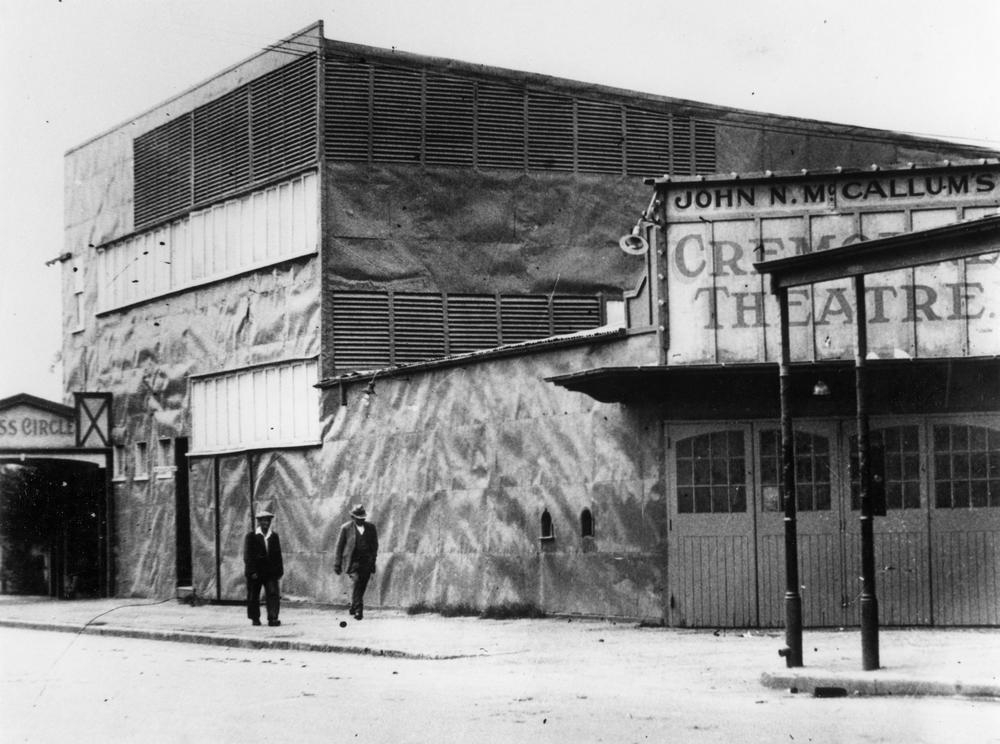
- Cremorne Theatre, c. 1934
- Interactive map of Cremorne Theatre
- Address: Stanley Street, South Brisbane; Brisbane, Brisbane; Australia
- Coordinates: 27.474464°S 153.020233°E
- Owner: John Neil McCallum
- Capacity: 1911 – 1,800 1919–1933 – 3,000, 1934–1952 1,300
- Type: Vaudeville, Burlesque, Drama

Construction
- Opened: 1911
- Closed: 1954
- Years active: 1902–1909, 1911–1929, 1930–1934, 1940–1952

The Cremorne Theatre was a theatre in South Brisbane (now part of South Bank), Brisbane, Queensland, Australia that operated, with interruptions, from 1911 to 1954. Although nothing remains of it today, the general location retains its cultural significance from the first half of the twentieth century as a theatre precinct, thanks to the nearby construction of Queensland Performing Arts Centre (QPAC) in 1985. Its name lives on in the Cremorne Theatre, one of the venues within QPAC.

== Location ==
The Cremorne Theatre was located on the river side of Stanley Street, South Brisbane, between Peel and Melbourne Streets, just to the north of where the Victoria Bridge crossed the Brisbane River from the city (27.4726°S 153.0188°E). The street alignments were changed with the South Bank development in the 1980s, with Stanley Street removed for much of its length from Vulture Street up to today's Stanley Place. The former theatre site is under the current Queensland Art Gallery. The 1985 QPAC theatre complex, including the modern Cremorne Theatre, is just to the south of the Victoria Bridge on the same street alignment, parallel to the river. QPAC's site on Melbourne Street adjoins the Cultural Centre Tunnel which turns under what would have been that street's intersection with Stanley Street and then follows the old street alignment past the original Cremorne Theatre site.

== History ==
=== Prior to the theatre ===
The theatre when it opened in 1911 was originally called the Cremorne Gardens, taking the name from a previous venue at the Stanley Street site. The name connects Brisbane to a riverside "pleasure garden" tradition from the Cremorne Gardens in London (1845–1877) and its Australian equivalents such as Cremorne Gardens, Melbourne (1853–1863); Sydney (1856–1862); Albany (1896–1910), Kalgoorlie (1907–current) and Perth (1895–1914) WA; and in Queensland: Rockhampton (1863 – 1886), Mackay (1886–1958) and Charters Towers (1902 – 1910?). Within the current South Bank, the development itself, particularly South Bank Parklands, can be seen as a modern equivalent to the Cremorne Gardens concept, at a scale much closer to the originals in London and Melbourne.

These pre-1911 Brisbane Cremorne Gardens, were likely, given the site size, much more modest than their antecedents. The first mention of them is being advertised as a concert venue for a pantomime company and a violin concert in 1902. The venue is also referred to in the Advertisement as O'Connor's Gardens. J.D. O'Connor was the publican of O'Connor's Hotel in Stanley Street in 1902. J.D. O'Connor's father-in-law, John Graham, had owned land in South Brisbane since 1842, and had run hotels in the vicinity from 1866 to 1896. In 1888 John Graham established Graham's Family Hotel in Stanley Street, South Brisbane and held the licence until 1896 when it was transferred to his son-in-law, who changed the name to O'Connor's Hotel.

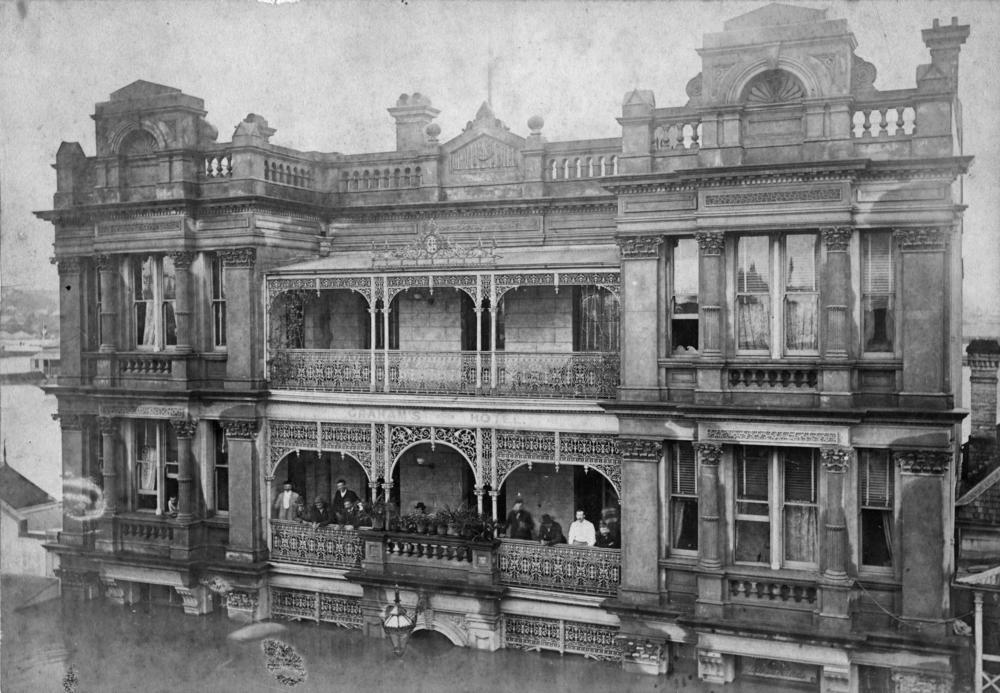
Graham's Hotel, Stanley Street, during the 1893 floods

There is a report in 1903 of O'Connor's Hotel having gardens on an extensive site and including a theatre called the Cremorne Gardens:

"There is a great area of ground, and every part of it is judiciously utilised. Between the frontages in Stanley and Grey streets are carpets of green grass and a wealth of tropical foliage, amidst which are scattered rustic seats and gas jets. ... There is even a theatre, known as Cremorne Gardens, used occasionally for public entertainments, and frequently for social gatherings."

Despite this report of a "theatre" existing in 1903, the historical sources cited in the next section all agree that the theatre was built in 1911. However, it is clear that a venue called Cremorne Gardens which included garden features was used for public performances for some years prior to 1911.

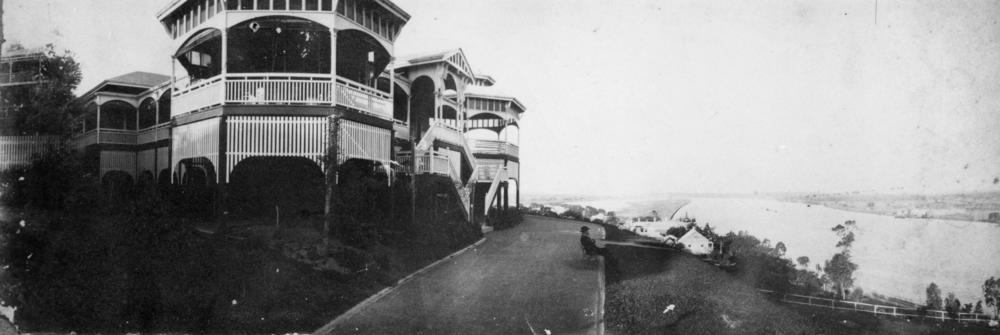
Cremorne residence on Hamilton Hill, Brisbane, ca. 1906

In 1905, J.D. O'Connor built a home, Cremorne, Hamilton, which appears to have been named after this part of his business. The house survives today as a heritage-listed villa at 34 Mullens Street, Hamilton, City of Brisbane, Queensland, Australia.

The Cremorne Gardens at O'Connor's Hotel continued as a concert and light theatre venue until 1909 when J.D. O'Connor retired and sold his business.

=== The theatre is built ===
Brisbane's Cremorne Theatre (originally known as the Cremorne Gardens) was built in 1911 by variety entrepreneur Edward Branscombe as part of an Australia-wide circuit of open-air theatres designed especially for his Dandies costume comedy companies. Originally an open-air structure with seating for about 1,800, the Cremorne Theatre opened on 5 August 1911 with a light program of music and sketches under the title "The Dandies." The newspaper, The Brisbane Courier, reported:

"...the goodly number of patrons present noted with satisfaction this well arranged auditorium, the whole place, upon which the title of 'Cremorne' has been bestowed, wearing an air of neatness, brightness and comfort."

Eight months later, a company, The Dandies Limited, was floated to buy the "Cremorne Gardens" site, which had an 88-foot frontage to Stanley Street, and also the theatrical business. The Prospectus claimed that £5,000 of improvements had been made to the property.

Brisbane's subtropical climate meant that the theatre's use was frequently interrupted by rainfall and it was closed temporarily in 1917 while weatherproof awnings were erected.

The theatre was at first managed, and then after its sale in 1916 by Branscombe's company, owned and operated, by John Neil McCallum, the father of Australian actor and producer, John McCallum. During the first ten years it was used mostly for vaudeville and variety shows, and for occasional drama productions with limited success. By 1919 MacCallum's company (The Dandies [Queensland] Limited) had improved and expanded the venue to a 3,000 seat capacity.

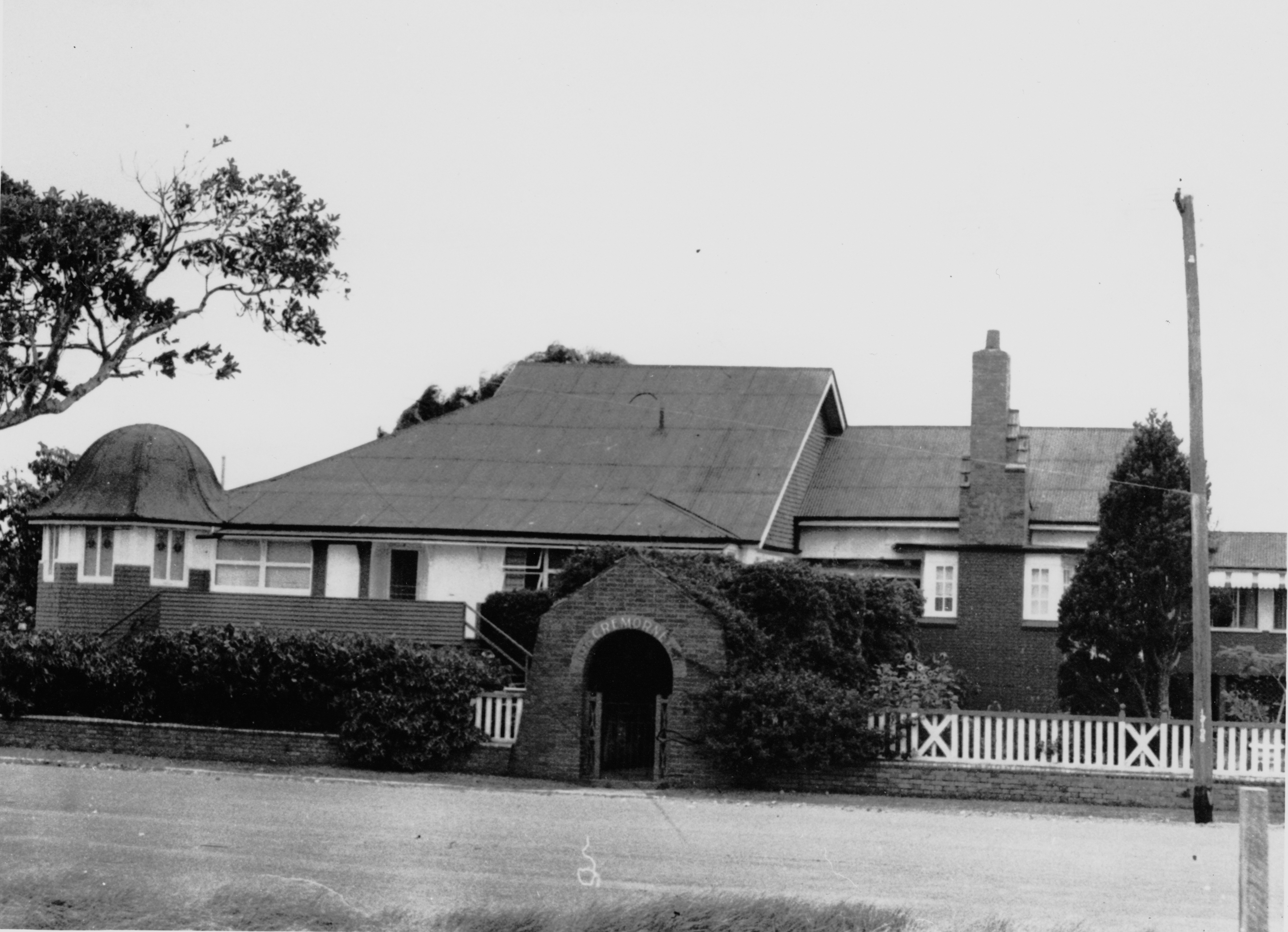
Cremorne, Sandgate. John Neil McCallum's house

McCallum, like O'Connor before him, built a house which he called Cremorne after his theatre. The name can still be seen above its entrance gateway at 152 Flinders Parade, Sandgate.

In 1926, the theatre was leased by McCallum to Greater Brisbane Amusements and a new ceiling and seating was installed in July of that year. It continued to prosper on and off; but by 1929 it was closed, being used only for meetings and the occasional amateur theatre production. During the early 1930s, the Brisbane Arts Theatre, the Brisbane Comic Opera and the Brisbane Repertory Theatre Society used it either as rehearsal space or for the staging of their productions.

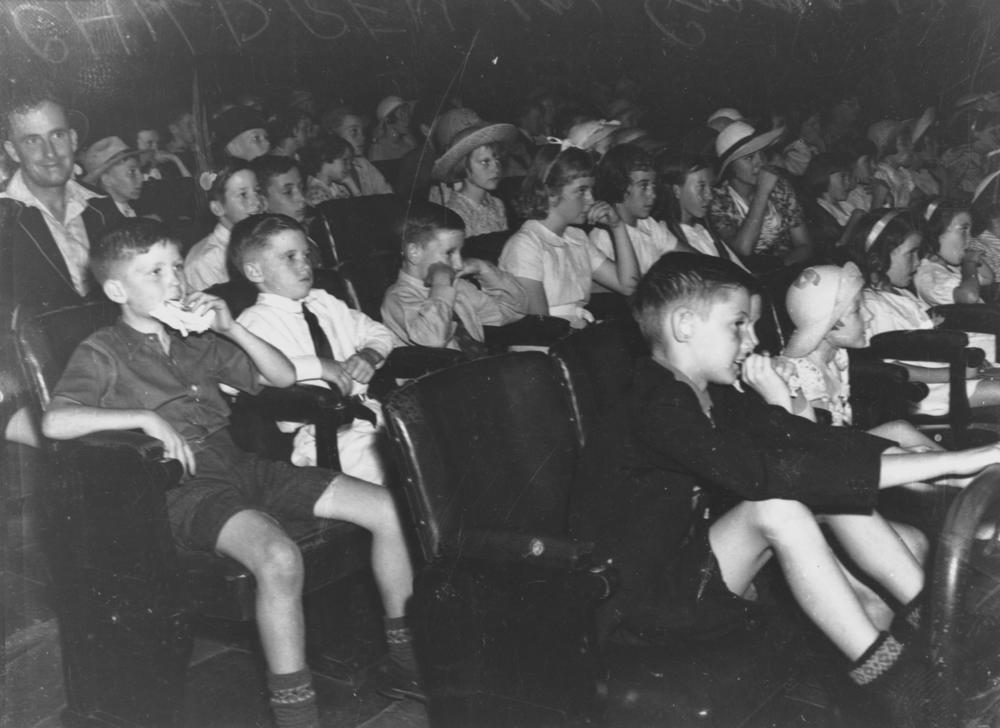
Children inside the Cremorne Theatre, 1938

In 1934 Metro-Goldwyn-Mayer converted the building into a cinema by installing a new proscenium, a screen, a new sound system, and by reducing the size of the auditorium down to 1,300. This use continued until 1940.

=== The Second World War ===
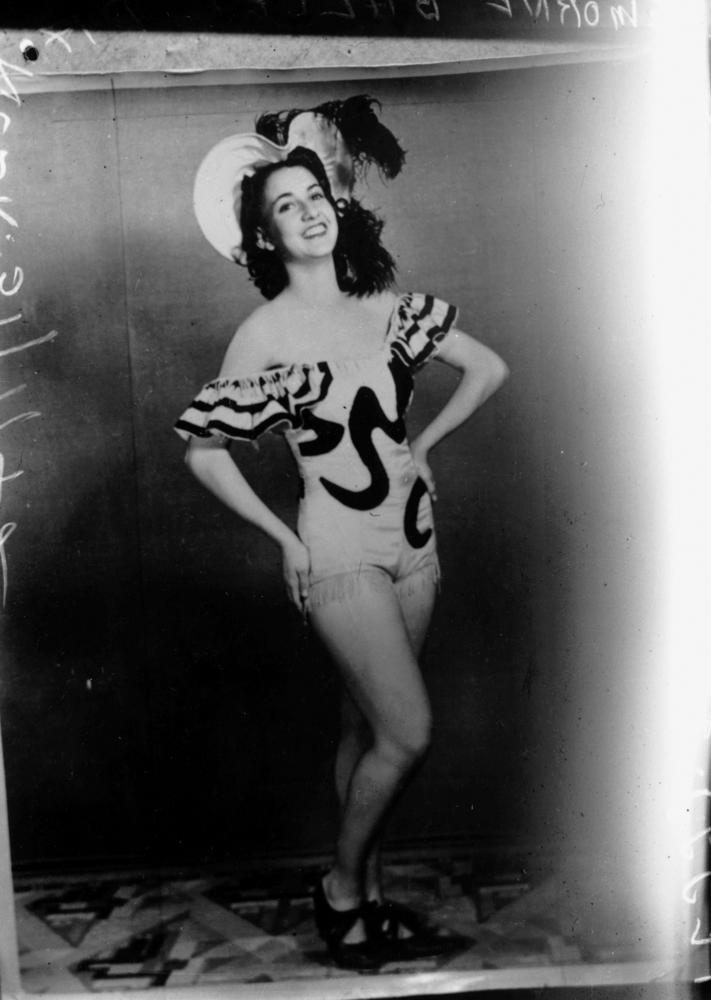
Chorus dancer at the old Cremorne Theatre in Brisbane in 1942

At the beginning of World War II, the theatre returned to the presentation of vaudeville, becoming the regular venue for Brisbane appearances by artists touring Australia for Tivoli Circuit, a national entertainment entrepreneur. The Cremorne Ballet, a female dance group who presented a slightly 'naughty' act, commanded a good following both with local and visiting men.

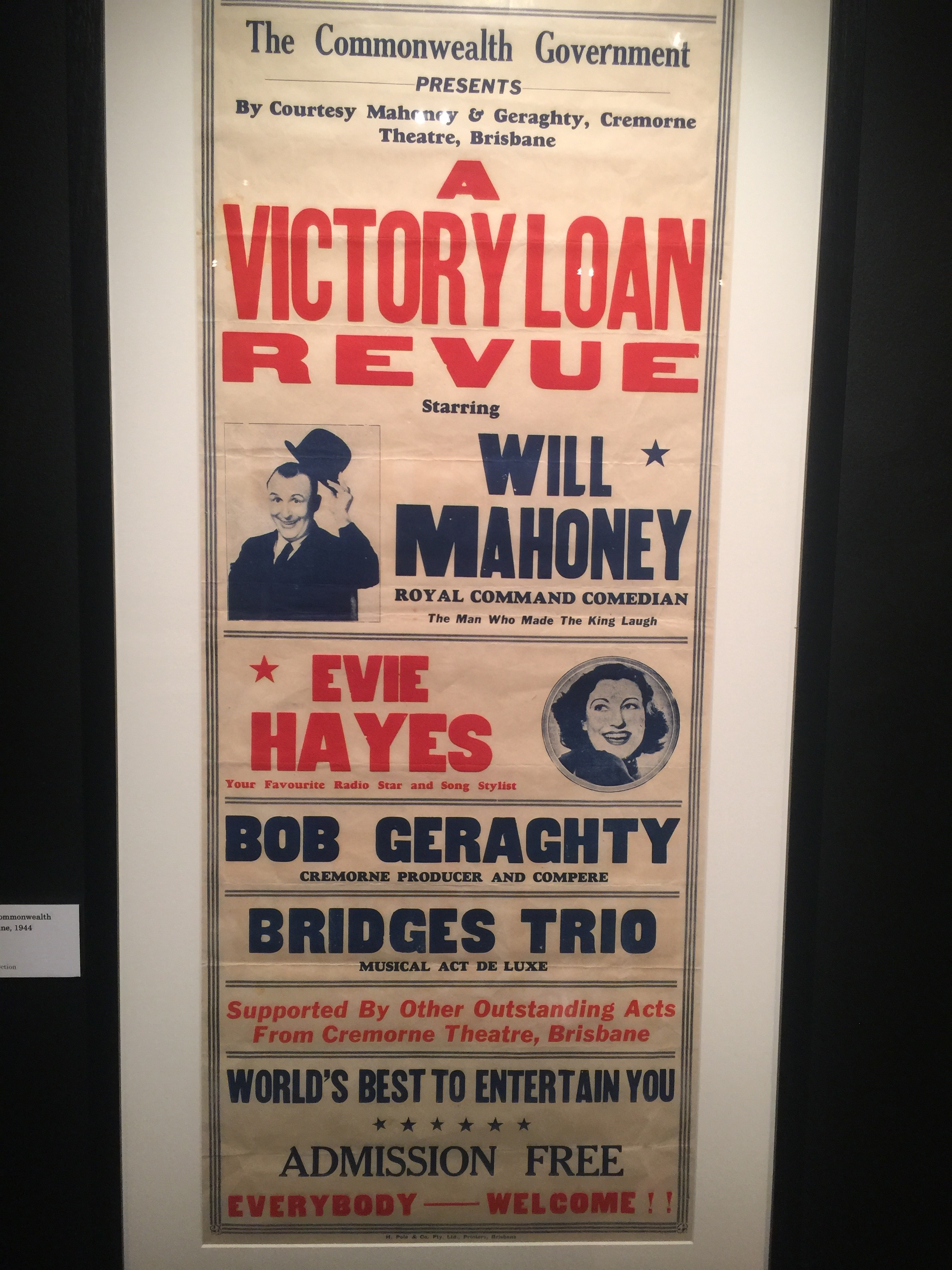
World War II poster from 1944 published by the Commonwealth of Australia publicising Will Mahoney's Troop, including Evie Hayes, Bob Geraghty and the Bridge Trio, for their performance at the Cremorne Theatre, Brisbane.

Then in 1943, the management was taken over by Will Mahoney and his wife, American entertainer Evie Hayes, together with American businessman Bob Geraghty. During World War II, the Cremorne became a popular entertainment venue for Australian and American servicemen on leave. Mahoney and Hayes appeared on stage regularly along with leading artists like comedian Roy Rene, actor and comedian George Wallace, actor, stuntman and circus performer Jim Gerald, singer Olga Vernon, comedian Buster Fiddess, vaudevillian Peggy Mortimer, actor and entertainer Morry Barling, Ron and Iris Shand – both were actors and versatile stage performers, and chatting cartoonist "Inky" Williams. Peggy Mortimer also appeared under her married name, Peggy Toppano, and was invited to perform at the Cremorne Theatre by Bob Geraghty.

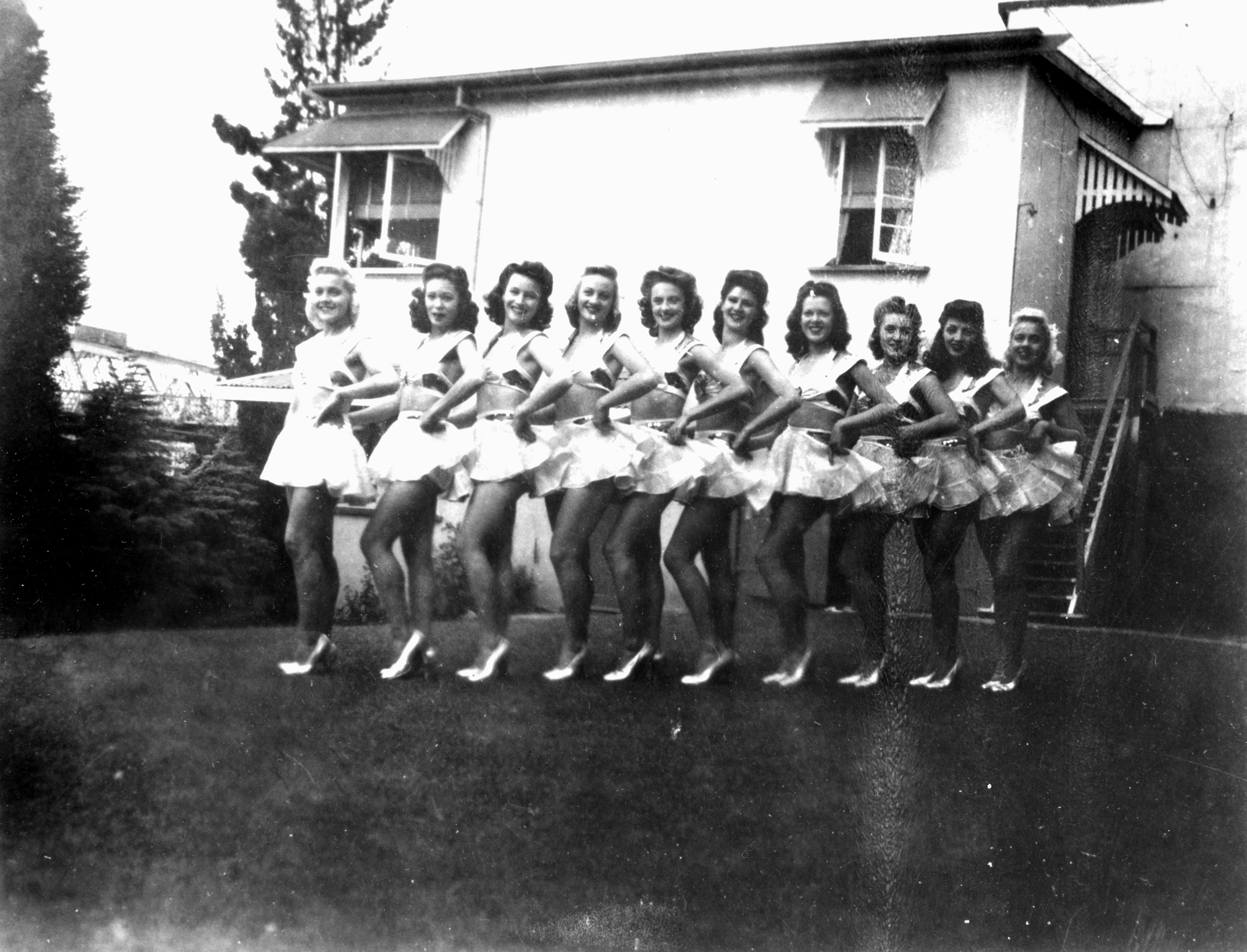
Chorus line in 1944 – The Soubrettes. The photograph was possibly taken at the back of the Cremorne Theatre. The Victoria Bridge can be partially seen at left, background.

=== Post-war ===
After the war, the Cremorne's role faded despite occasional professional use under strong competition from cinemas and a general decline in demand for live entertainment. From 1949 onwards, local groups used it for productions. In particular, The Brisbane Opera Society and the Theatre Guild of Queensland appeared there regularly.

It was in fact with the Brisbane Opera Society, under the musical direction of George English, that arguably Australia's most famous operatic tenor Donald Smith (tenor), sang his first operas. Some of these operas included "Merry England" by Edward German, "The Bohemian Girl" by Michael William Balfe, "Maritana" by William Vincent Wallace, Gunoud's "Faust" and Ruggero Leoncavallo opera "Pagliacci".

John McCallum leased the theatre to Universal International Pictures in 1951 and by mid-1952 the building had been converted for use as offices and storage facilities for film distribution. The last recorded program is for a production by the Musical & Theatre Guild of Queensland of "The Desert Song" on 3 May 1952. The Theatre burnt down in 1954 and was never rebuilt.

=== Legacy ===
Fifteen years after the Cremorne Theatre's demise, in the late 1960s, proposals were put forward for a theatre complex for the city, but these did not progress until the impending loss of Her Majesty's Theatre in 1974. The Queensland Performing Arts Centre (QPAC) was the result and was completed in 1985 on a site just around the corner from the old Cremorne Theatre.

The QPAC management makes claim to be continuing the heritage of the Cremorne Theatre as part of a "cultural precinct". There is a new Cremorne Theatre within the QPAC complex, although it is the smallest theatre within the complex at 312 seats. The four QPAC theatres – the Concert Hall, Lyric Theatre, Playhouse and Cremorne Theatre combined have a seat capacity at 4,950 which is about two third's higher again than that of the original Cremorne Theatre at its height.

The current building includes, at ground level, a Gallery used for theatre exhibitions, for example, in 2016 "Theatres of War" which included a poster from the original Cremorne Theatre's own wartime service in World War II.

=== Today's Theatre ===
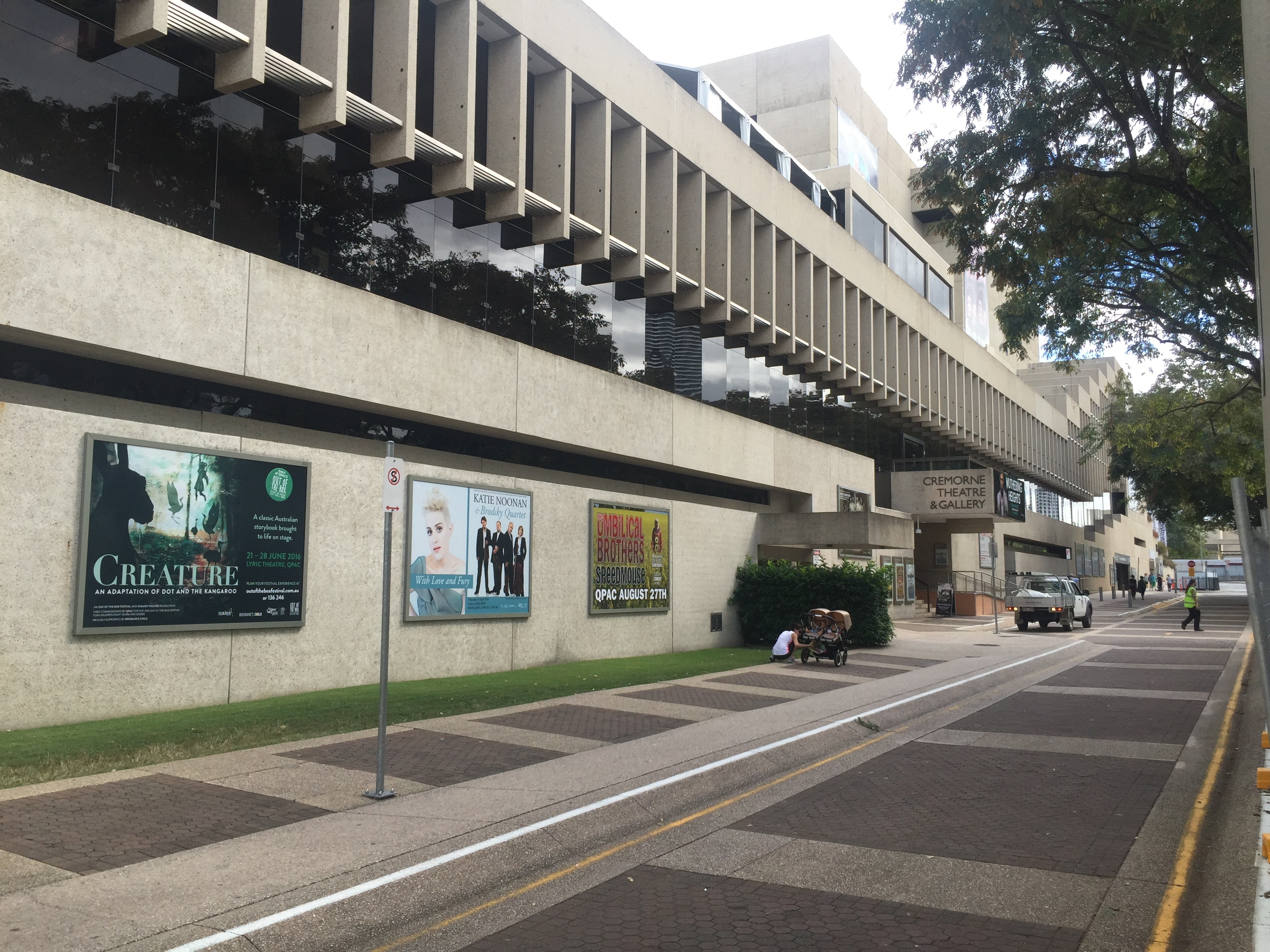
Cremorne Theatre side of the Queensland Performing Arts Centre (QPAC) theatre complex on the Brisbane River, South Bank, Brisbane.

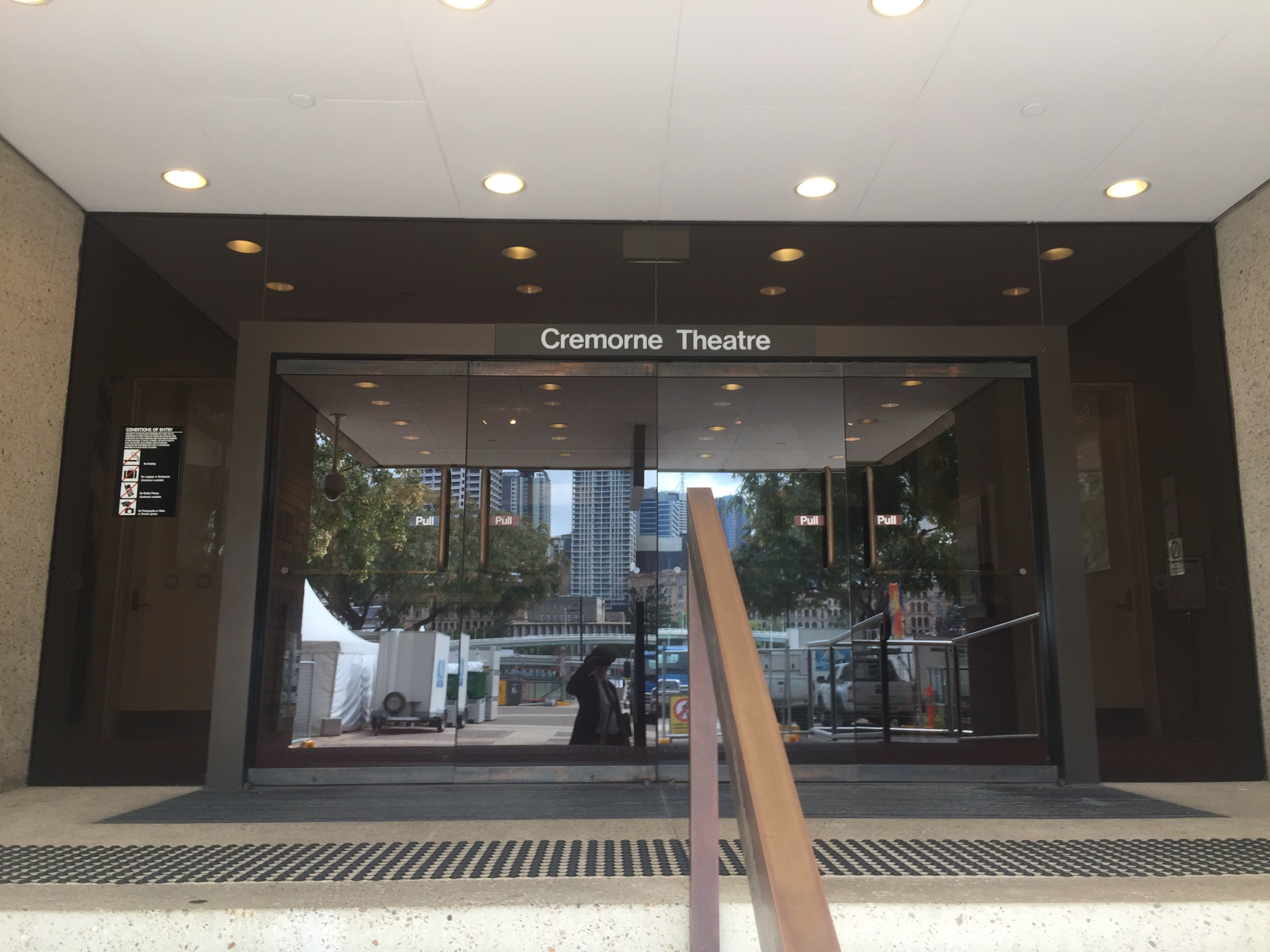
Entrance to Cremorne Theatre and Gallery. CBD high rise buildings directly opposite across the Brisbane River, are reflected in the Theatre's glass doors.

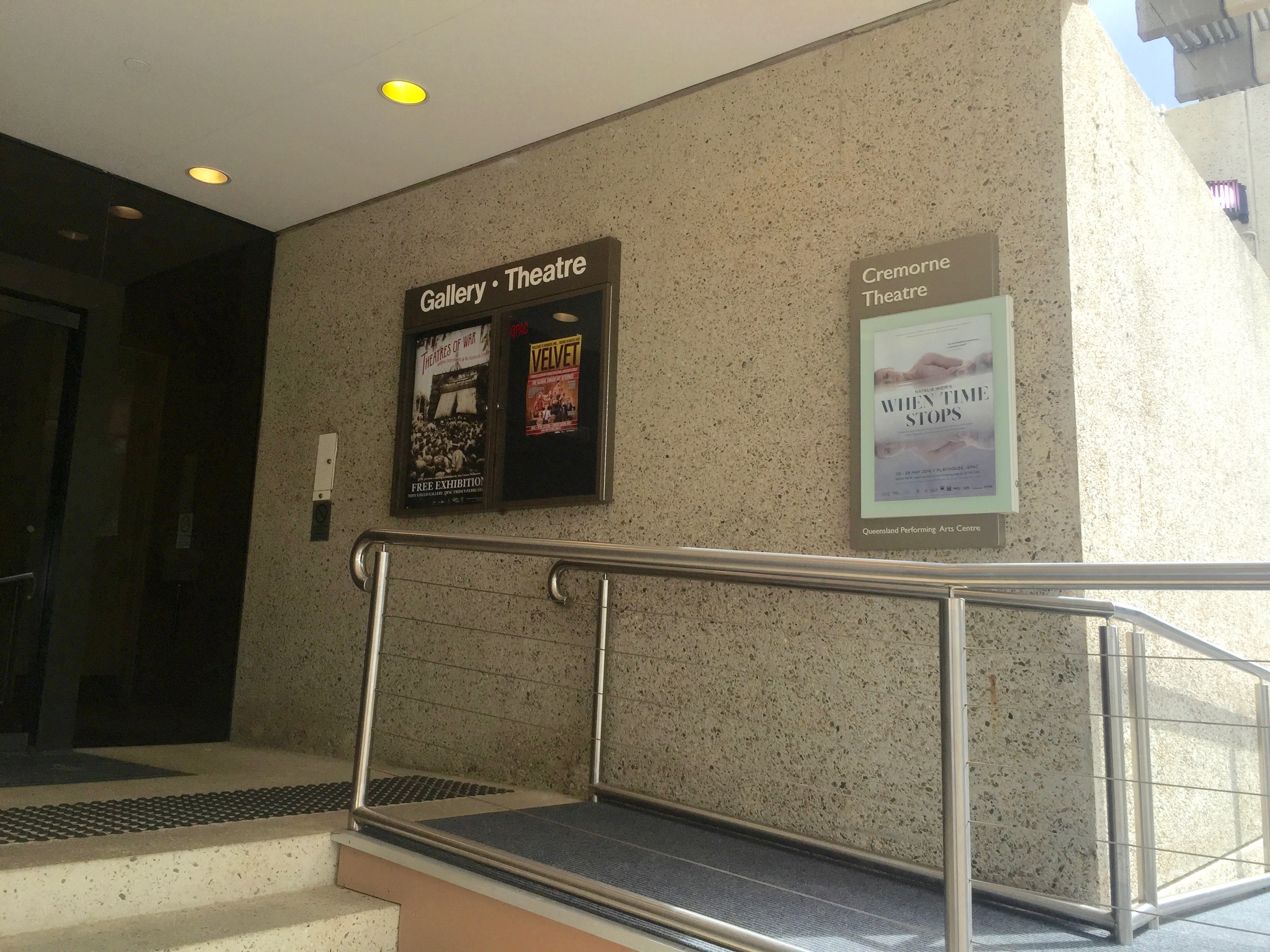
Cremorne Theatre and Gallery Billboards at April 2016 showing the then current "Theatres of War" exhibition in the Gallery and the upcoming dance work "When Time Stops" in the Theatre.
