= Robertson Point Light =

Lighthouse in New South Wales, Australia

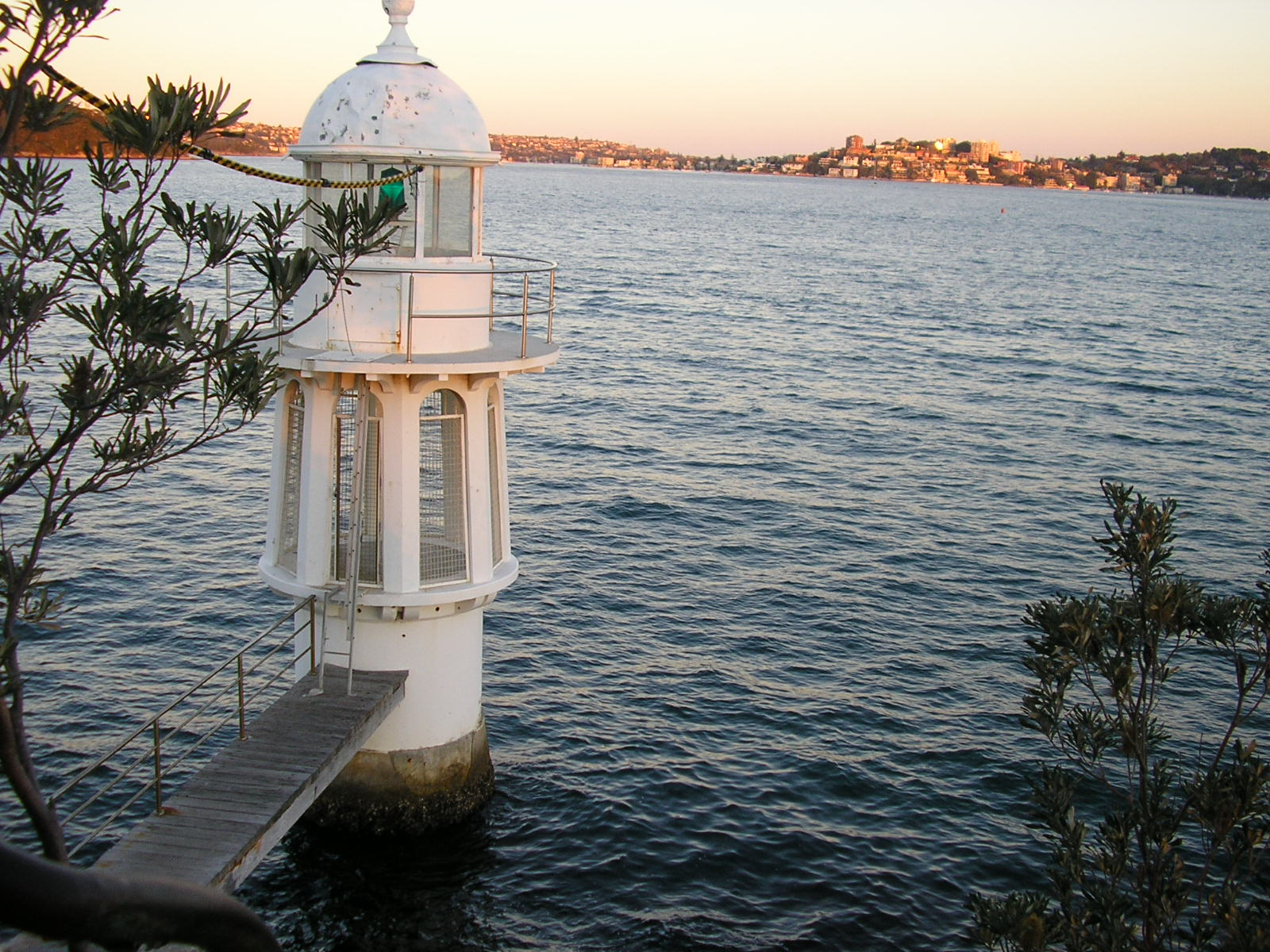
- Robertson Point Light
- Location: Cremorne Point; New South Wales; Australia
- Coordinates: 33°50′55.62″S 151°13′58.85″E

Tower
- Constructed: 1910
- Foundation: rock
- Height: 26 feet (7.9 m)
- Shape: cylindrical tower with balcony and lantern
- Markings: white tower and lantern
- Operator: Port Authority of New South Wales

Light
- Focal height: 25 feet (7.6 m)
- Range: 5 nautical miles (9.3 km)
- Characteristic: Oc G 3s.

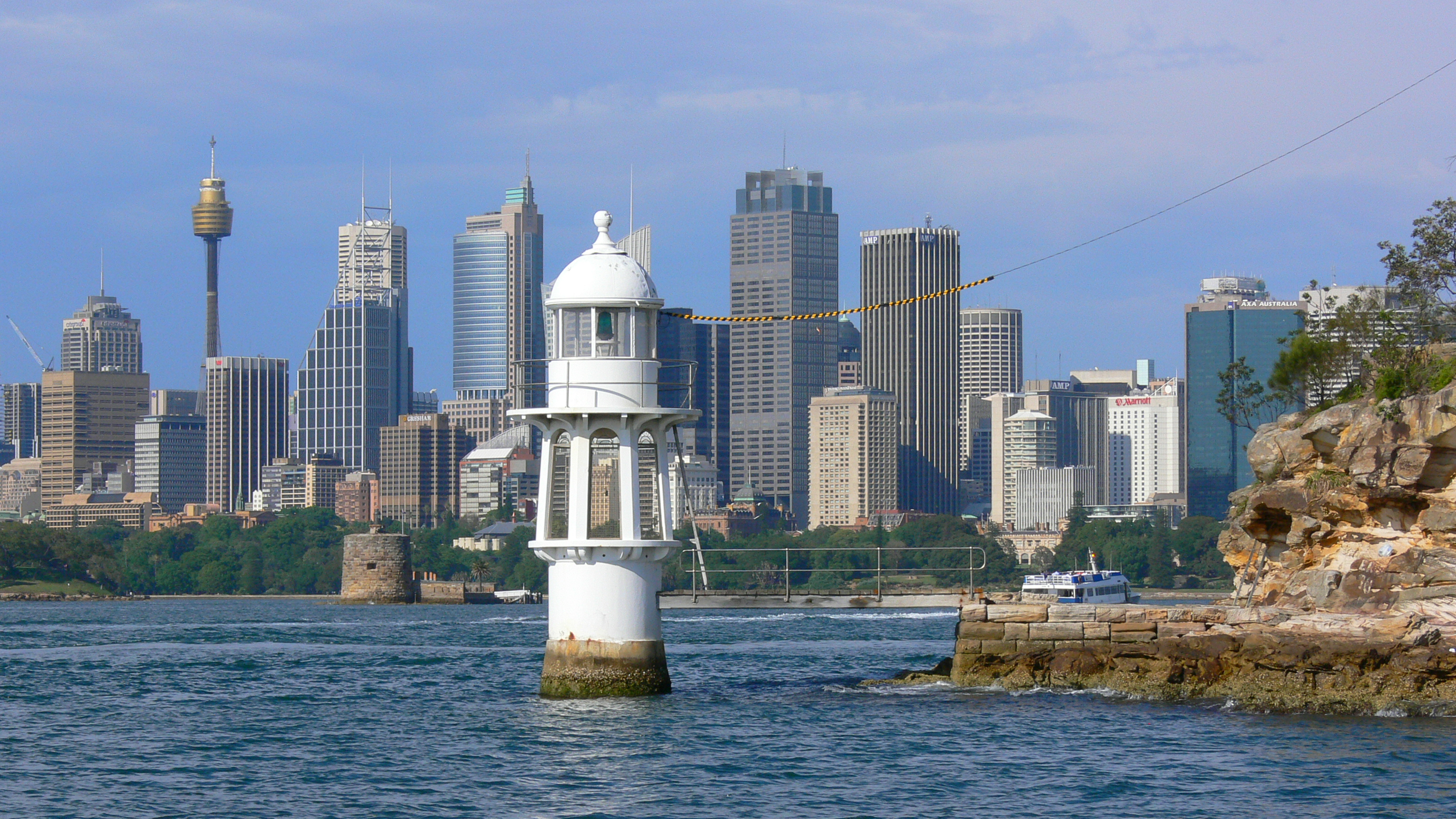
Robertson Point Light.

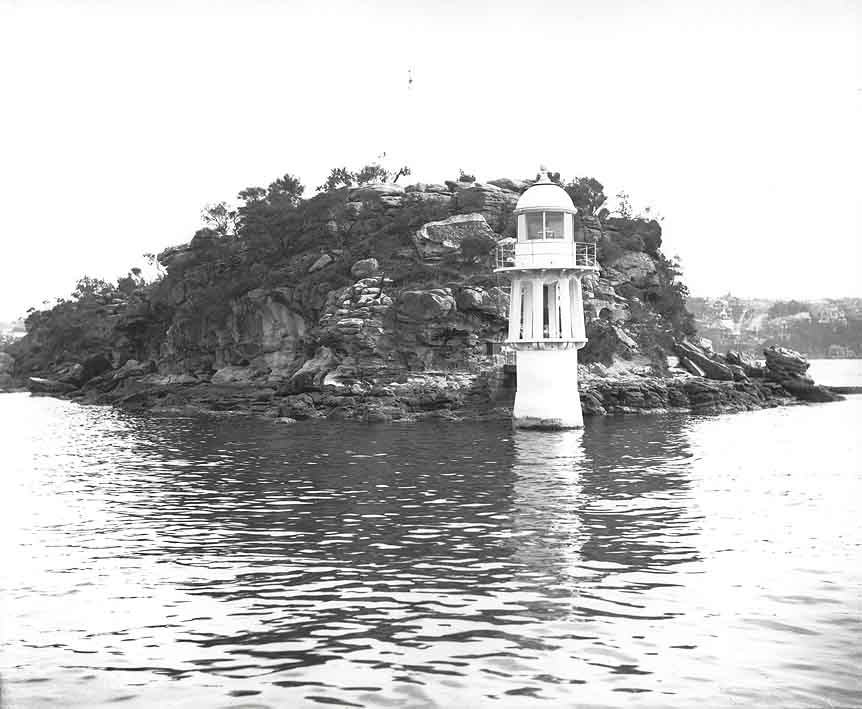
Historic view of the lighthouse, note the different light source

Robertson Point Light, also known as Cremorne Point Light, is an active lighthouse in Cremorne Point, a suburb on the lower North Shore of Sydney, New South Wales, Australia. It is the sibling of Bradleys Head Light.

The lighthouse is mounted on a rock and connected to shore by a footbridge.

The light characteristic shown is a green occulting light with a cycle of three seconds (Oc.G. 3s), the same as Bradleys Head Light.

== Site operation ==
The light is operated by the Sydney Ports Corporation, while the site is managed by the North Sydney Municipal Council as part of the Cremorne Point Reserve.

== Visiting ==
The site is open and accessible to the public, but the tower itself is closed. Parking is available at the end of Milson Road in Cremorne Point.

== See also ==
- List of lighthouses in Australia
