= 28 Mistral Avenue, Mosman =

28 Mistral Avenue
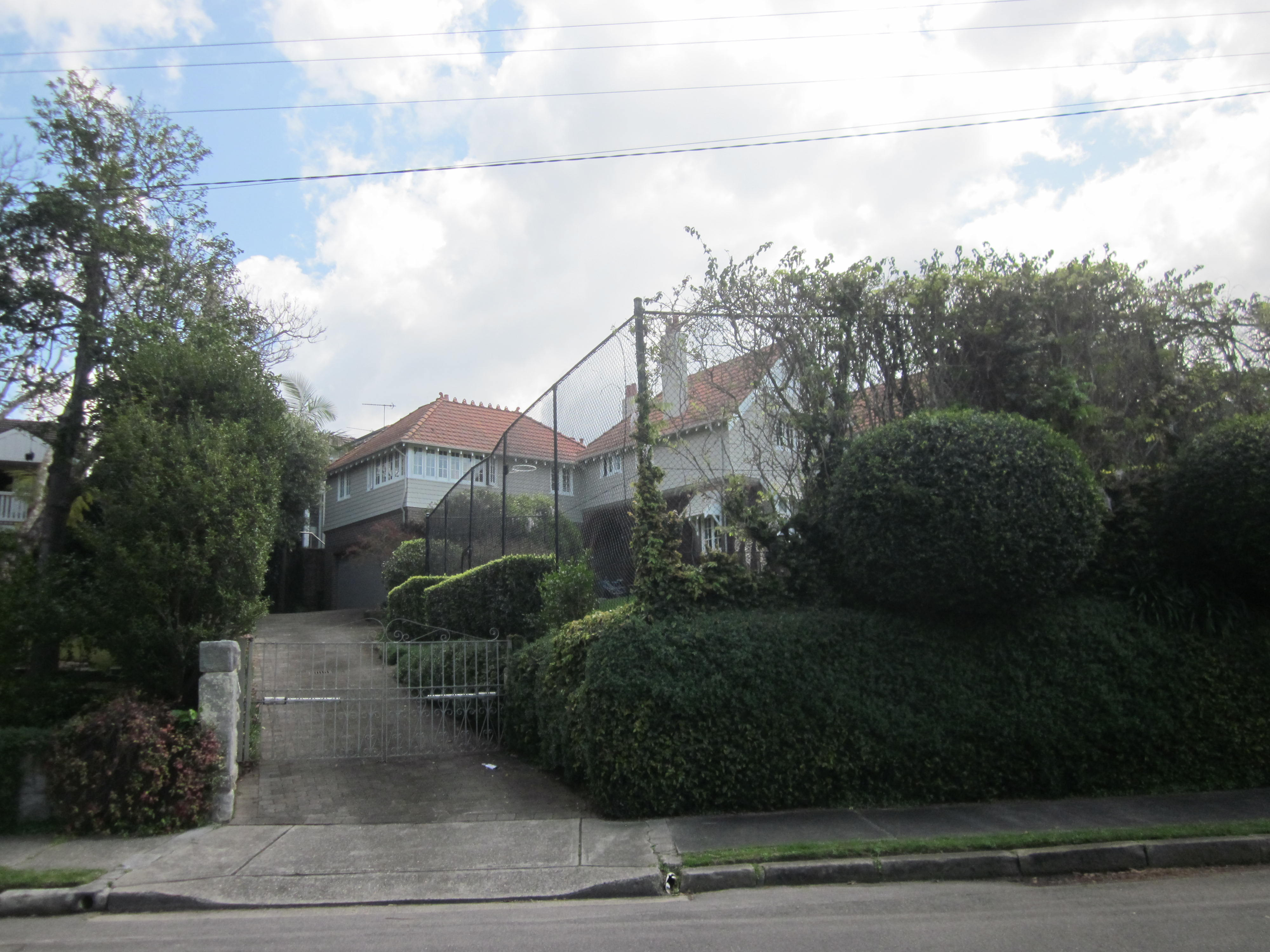
- 28 Mistral Avenue, Mosman, New South Wales

- Location within Sydney Location within Australia
- 33.8357°S 151.2398°E
- Location: 28 Mistral Avenue, Mosman, Mosman Council, New South Wales, Australia

History
- Built: c. 1900

Site notes
- Architect: E. Jeaffreson Jackson
- Architectural style: Federation Arts and Crafts

New South Wales Heritage Register
- Official name: 28 Mistral Avenue, Mosman; Residence; 8 Magic Grove
- Type: State heritage (built)
- Designated: 2 April 1999
- Reference no.: 210
- Type: House
- Category: Residential buildings (private)

28 Mistral Avenue is a heritage-listed residence located at 28 Mistral Avenue, Mosman in the Mosman Council local government area of New South Wales, Australia. It was designed by E. Jeaffreson Jackson. It is also known as 8 Magic Grove. It was added to the New South Wales State Heritage Register on 2 April 1999.

== History ==
The original Mistral Avenue property included no. 26, an adjoining vacant block of landscaped garden which existed under a separate title. This block has been sold and a house is being built on it.

The residence was designed by the noted architect E. Jeaffreson Jackson around the turn of the century (1900) in the shingle style displaying a North American influence. The house is essentially intact and retains most of its original external detailing and materials including its timber shingles, casement windows and terracotta tiles. The house is complemented by its tennis court and street tree planting of brush box (Lophostemon confertus) trees.

The house was the home for 36 years of a former President of the New South Wales Legislative Council and managing editor of The Land newspaper, Sir Harry Budd, and his family until his death in 1978. Describing the house as a "nice, cosy family house but with no history and little architectural merit", Lady Budd said yesterday that the house had been altered before her family lived there and that she and her husband had made several extensive renovations. "We bought the house from people named Jesson, who had let it for many years," Lady Budd said. "The Jessons put in the tennis court." The Budd family had the house re-roofed when the tiles started to deteriorate "about 20 years ago" and had installed fireplaces in two of the upstairs bedrooms. A china cabinet downstairs hid another fireplace. A long living room downstairs, originally two rooms separated by sliding doors, was altered and dark wooden panelling, typical of pre-war interior design, was removed. The Budd family also made extensive alterations to the kitchen, converting two pantries into a scullery and laundry.

A 1979 Heritage Branch report dealt with the then current sale of 26-28 Mistral Avenue to a development company whose plans involved a part subdivision of its grounds for a new house and renovation of the existing house. The house forms part of a classified area by the National Trust of Australia (NSW) - the Magic Grove Group, consisting of two houses. Both houses in the group were designed by E. Jeaffreson Jackson and are stylistically related to each other.

The grass lawn tennis court forms a part of the curtilage of the building and has been designed to relate to it as the garden front. An order would ensure that any subdivision of the third lot would retain its trees and that any new house would be appropriately sited and designed to blend with the existing.

In response to the proposed subdivision and sale of 26-28 Mistral Avenue, the site was made the subject of an interim conservation order on 14 December 1979. The site of the side garden has now been sold and the erection of a house approved under section 60 of the Heritage Act. This proposed house has been designed in sympathy in terms of siting and design to the existing Federation house.

This residence, together with the landscaped front area containing the grass tennis court, was sold separately at auction, subsequent to the order being gazetted.

Jeaffreson Jackson was an influential and innovative architect in the area of residential designs with examples of his work appearing in Arts and Architecture and other leading magazines of the day. There are nine known residential examples of Jeaffreson Jackson's designs surviving in Sydney, of which three are located in Mosman. The small number and quality of his designs warrant recognition and protection under the Heritage Act. The other two Jeaffresson Jackson houses in Mosman are Tregoyd, the home of Sir Tristan and Lady Antico on the Balmoral slopes and 17 Calypso Avenue, opposite 28 Mistral Avenue.

No. 28 Mistral Avenue is sited opposite that of another house designed by the same architect producing an important group relationship.

Both houses are essentially intact and located on corner sites, this combined with their two-storey height, similar style, distinctive designs and landscaped setting of extensive lawns produces an interesting townscape element.

The grass lawn tennis court forms an essential part of the curtilage of the building and has been designed to relate to it as the garden front. Subdivision of all the original garden has occurred and this lawn tennis court area, which exists under separate title represents the last potential building site. However this site is considered to form the minimum comfortable curtilage for the house. The retention of this site as a grassed tennis court is realistic both in physical and economic terms as the shortage of suburban courts has ensured that houses with one command a premium price, particularly in Mosman.

== Description ==
=== Site ===
The house is set above street level with a stone retaining wall at the street frontage. The house still enjoys a large site, though it is placed to the rear of its allotment and a tennis court dominates the front garden.

The grass lawn tennis court forms an essential part of the curtilage of the building and has been designed to relate to it as the garden front. Subdivision of all the original garden has occurred and this lawn tennis court area, which exists under separate title represents the last potential building site. However this site is considered to form the minimum comfortable curtilage for the house. The retention of this site as a grassed tennis court is realistic both in physical and economic terms as the shortage of suburban courts has ensured that houses with one command a premium price, particularly in Mosman.

The house is completed in the Federation Arts and Crafts style, the large, two-storey rambling house ground floor is in face brick, the upper level in timber shingles and the roof of terracotta. Features include bay windows, hoods and small pane windows. A tennis court on the street frontage is visually intrusive.

=== Condition ===
As at 25 May 2007, the house was essentially intact and retains most of its original external detailing and materials including its timber shingles, casement windows and terracotta tiles. It is complemented by its grass tennis court.

=== Modifications and dates ===
The original property included no. 26 Mistral Avenue, an adjoining vacant block of landscaped garden which existed under a separate title. This block has been sold and a house is being built on it.

The grass lawn tennis court forms an essential part of the curtilage of the building and has been designed to relate to it as the garden front. Subdivision of all the original garden has occurred and this lawn tennis court area, which exists under separate title represents the last potential building site. However this site is considered to form the minimum comfortable curtilage for the house.

Lady Budd said that the house had been altered before her family lived there and that she and her husband had made several extensive renovations. "We bought the house from people named Jesson, who had let it for many years," Lady Budd said. "The Jessons put in the tennis court." The Budds had the house re-roofed when the tiles started to deteriorate "about 20 years ago" and had installed fireplaces in two of the upstairs bedrooms. A china cabinet downstairs hid another fireplace. A long living room downstairs, originally two rooms separated by sliding doors, was altered and dark wooden panelling, typical of pre-war interior design, was removed. The Budd family also made extensive alterations to the kitchen, converting two pantries into a scullery and laundry.

A garage & parent's bedroom was added in c. 1988; a swimming pool was installed in c. 2000; with subsequent minor alterations.

== Heritage listing ==
As at 23 May 2007, 28 Mistral Avenue has historic and aesthetic significance as a rare Sydney example of a residence designed by the noted architect E. Jeaffreson Jackson around the turn of the century (1900) in the shingle (Federation Arts & Crafts) style displaying a North American influence. The house is essentially intact and retains most of its original external detailing and materials including its timber shingles, casement windows and terracotta tiles. The house is complemented by its tennis court and street tree planting of brush box (Lophostemon confertus) trees.

Jeaffreson Jackson was an influential and innovative architect in the area of residential designs with examples of his work appearing in Arts and Architecture and other leading magazines of the day. There are 9 known residential examples of his designs surviving in Sydney, of which three are located in Mosman. The small number and quality of his designs warrant recognition and protection under the Heritage Act.

The property has historic associations as the home for 36 years of a former President of the Legislative Council of NSW and managing editor of The Land newspaper, Sir Harry Budd, and his family until his death in 1978.

The grass lawn tennis court forms an essential part of the curtilage of the building and has been designed to relate to it as the garden front. This site is considered to form the minimum comfortable curtilage for the house.

No. 28 Mistral Avenue is sited opposite that of another house designed by the same architect producing an important group relationship. Both houses are essentially intact and located on corner sites, this combined with their two-storey height, similar style, distinctive designs and landscaped setting of extensive lawns produces an interesting townscape element.

A large residence set in extensive grounds that, by virtue of the composition of its three major unified wings, avoids overly dominating its setting.

28 Mistral Avenue, Mosman was listed on the New South Wales State Heritage Register on 2 April 1999.

== See also ==
- Australian residential architectural styles
