= Mosman Bay Sewage Aqueduct =

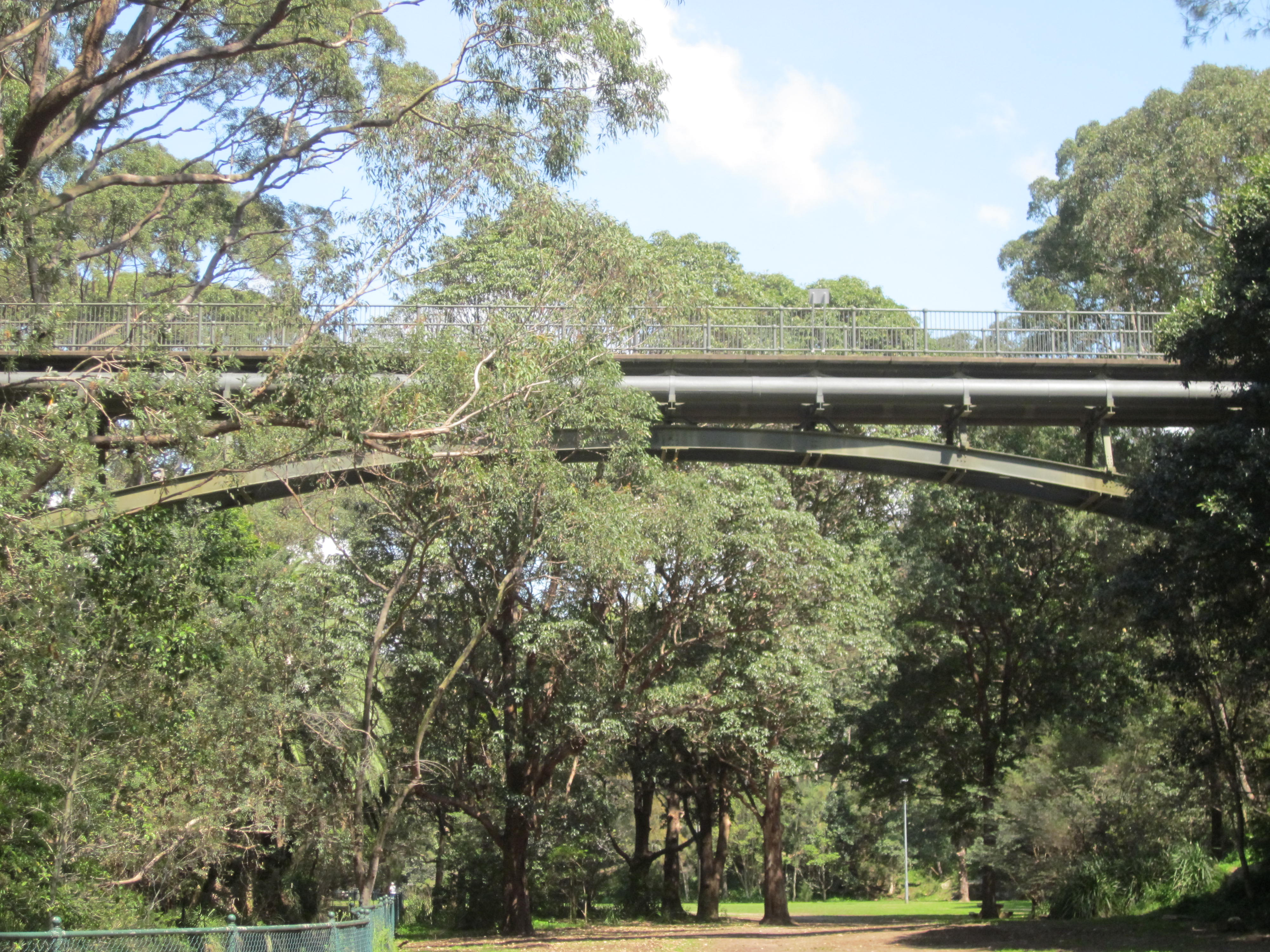
- View of Aqueduct showing sewage pipe below walkway

- Location within Sydney Location within Australia
- 33°50′05″S 151°14′00″E
- Location: Avenue Road, Mosman, Mosman Council, New South Wales, Australia

History
- Built: 1899–1901

Site notes
- Architect(s): Sewerage Construction Branch; NSW Department of Public Works
- Owner: Sydney Water

New South Wales Heritage Register
- Official name: Mosman Bay Sewage Aqueduct; Aqueduct over Mosman's Bay
- Type: State heritage (built)
- Designated: 18 November 1999
- Reference no.: 1328
- Type: Sewage Aqueduct
- Category: Utilities – Sewerage
- Builders: NSW Department of Public Works

The Mosman Bay Sewage Aqueduct is a heritage-listed public pedestrian bridge and sewage aqueduct at Avenue Road, Mosman in the Mosman Council local government area of New South Wales, Australia. It was designed by Sewerage Construction Branch and NSW Department of Public Works and built from 1899 to 1901 by NSW Department of Public Works. It is also known as the Aqueduct over Mosman Bay. The property is owned by Sydney Water, an agency of the Government of New South Wales. It was added to the New South Wales State Heritage Register on 18 November 1999.

== History ==
The sewage aqueduct over Reid Park at the head of Mosman Bay was partially completed by 1901 (and fully completed by 1904) as part of the Neutral Bay and Mosman branch sewerage scheme. The sewer originally discharged into the Folly Point (Primrose Park) sewerage treatment plant. This was one of the earliest of the lower north shore sewerage schemes, which were constructed between 1891 and 1898. The bridge was designed in the Sewerage Construction branch of the Department of Public Works in June 1899. The engineer-in-chief of this department was Joseph Davis. The design provided for an aqueduct to "connect the second and third divisions of this sewer where it crosses the tidal waters at the head of Mosman Bay". The design of a steel parabolic arch of 43 metres (140 ft) span was evidently determined by need to provide a structure "in such a way as to be no disfigurement to the locality (and) for convenience of foot passengers, a bridge will be built on top of the aqueduct."

The aqueduct is one of two examples of a steel arch aqueduct constructed in Sydney for sewerage and water supplies (another carried the rising water main from Ryde to Chatswood reservoir over the Lane Cove River, in the second bridge on that site.) It is the only aqueduct with pedestrian access. The steel use in the construction of the aqueduct was imported from England. Due to delays encountered in the delivery of this material construction work did not commence until 1900. The aqueduct was originally fitted with two foot diameter riveted steel pipe, which was replaced with a welded steel pipe in 1937. In 1926 the Neutral Bay and Mosman branch sewer was connected to nearly completed Northern Suburbs Ocean Outfall Sewer. Two additional twenty inch diameter mild steel pipes were laid in 1971. Also at this time the timber slat paving of the pedestrian bridge was replaced with concrete blocks.

This is one of six sewage aqueducts in Sydney completed in the period 1895–1901. Others include the reinforced concrete "Monier" arches at Whites Creek and Johnstons Creek (1897), the mass concrete/brick arches and iron pipe at Wolli Creek and Cooks River (1895), the Lewisham concrete/stone pier and steel oviform carrier (1900).

== Description ==
An arched steel aqueduct built for the purpose of enabling water mains to be carted over a gully, linking Avenue Road and Bay Street Mosman. The single span steel arch aqueduct currently carries three pipes. Two 500-millimetre (20 in) mild steel cement lined pipes laid between 1968 and 1971 and a 600-millimetre (24 in) mild steel cement lined pipe which replaces a rivetted original with the same diameter. The fix ended steel arch has a span of 42.68 metres (140.0 ft) with arch members being "18inches x 7 inch x 75lbs per ft." A pedestrian walkway was built along the top of the pipes and the arch now serves a dual purpose.

=== Modifications and dates ===
In 1968, maintenance and up-grading works were commenced and consisted of the addition of 2,530-millimetre (100 in) pipes and the replacement of the slats of the timber footbridge with concrete block paving.

== Heritage listing ==
As at 21 April 2005, the Mosman Bay Aqueduct over Reid Park, completed in 1901, was a magnificent piece of Federation era engineering constructed from imported steel. It is one of two such structures in Sydney Water's portfolio of assets, which as a type are unique in New South Wales. The aqueduct was designed to provide the conveyance of sewerage over the bay as part of the Neutral Bay and Mosman branch sewerage scheme, one of the earliest of the lower north shore sewerage schemes constructed from 1891. The structure is a key element in the historic built environment of the lower north shore, and continues to serve as a pedestrian right-of-way. The structure forms an intrinsic element of the landscaping of Reids Park. Elements of significance are past and ongoing use, technology of construction, the shape of the arch, and setting within the park, inclusive of views.

Mosman Bay Sewage Aqueduct was listed on the New South Wales State Heritage Register on 18 November 1999 having satisfied the following criteria.

The place is important in demonstrating the course, or pattern, of cultural or natural history in New South Wales.

The aqueduct was designed to provide the conveyance of sewage over Mosman Bay as part of the Neutral Bay and Mosman branch sewerage scheme, one of the earliest of the lower north shore sewerage schemes constructed from 1891.

The place is important in demonstrating aesthetic characteristics and/or a high degree of creative or technical achievement in New South Wales.

The Mosman Bay Aqueduct over Reid Park completed in 1901 is a piece of Federation era engineering set within a public reserve.

The place has a strong or special association with a particular community or cultural group in New South Wales for social, cultural or spiritual reasons.

The structure is a key element in the historic built environment of the Mosman area, and continues to serve as a pedestrian right-of-way. The structure is listed by authorities such as the National Trust of Australia (NSW).

The place has potential to yield information that will contribute to an understanding of the cultural or natural history of New South Wales.

The bridge structure incorporates an extensive quantity of imported steel work, which is likely to be rare for this date outside of railway construction.

The place possesses uncommon, rare or endangered aspects of the cultural or natural history of New South Wales.

The use of a steel supporting structure with pedestrian bridge is rare; another example is the aqueduct over the Lane Cove River. Collectively these two bridges are rare in NSW as a type.

The place is important in demonstrating the principal characteristics of a class of cultural or natural places/environments in New South Wales.

The siting of the aqueduct within a reclaimed public reserve is representative of other items of Water Board infrastructure located on the lower north shore.

== See also ==
- Sydney Water
