= Athol Hall, Mosman =

Historical building in New South Wales, Australia

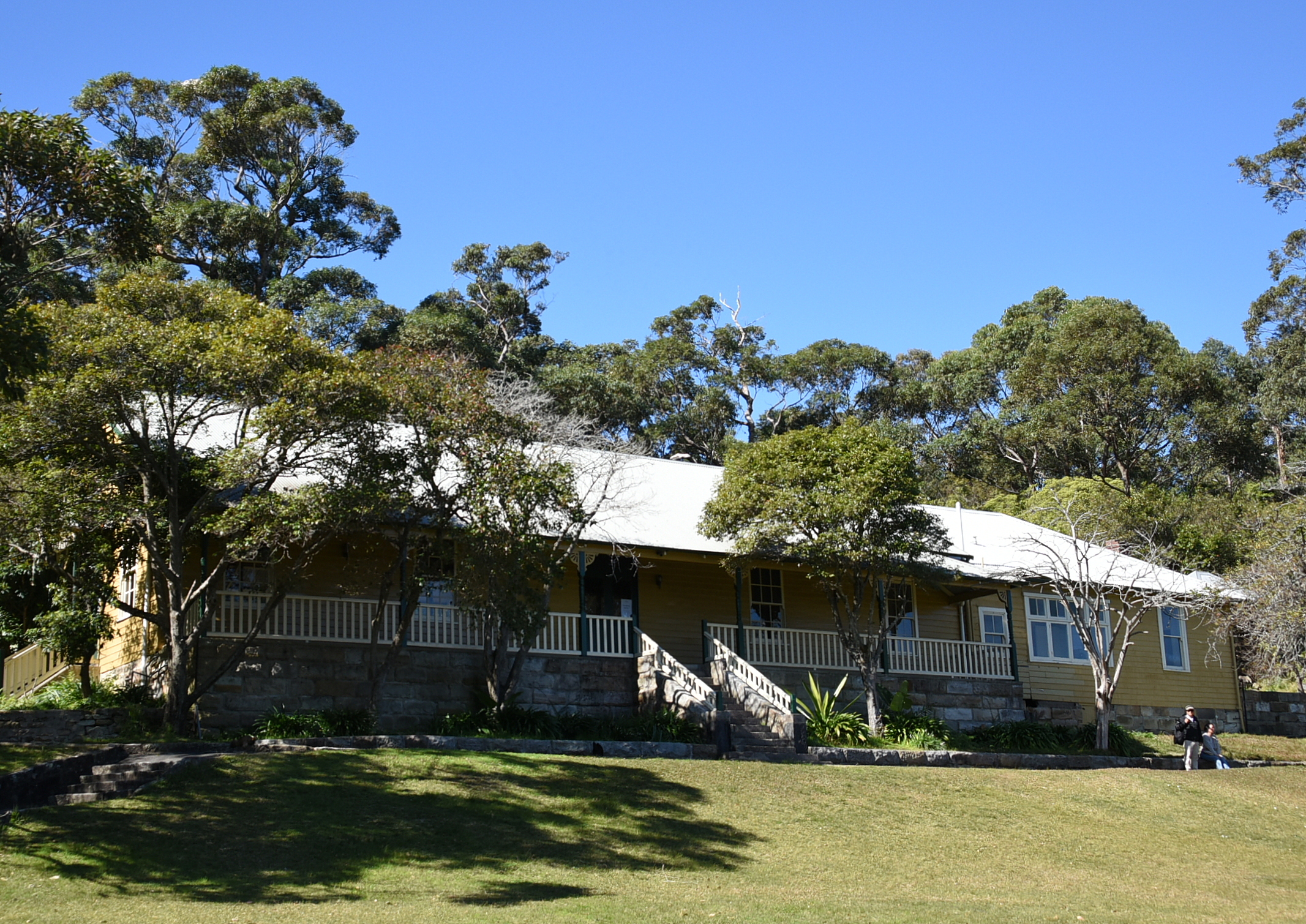
Athol Hall, Mosman

Athol Hall, Mosman, New South Wales is a building of historical significance and is listed on the NSW Heritage Register. It was built on the site a complex called Athol Gardens Hotel. The hotel was originally a house built in about 1850. The present hall was erected in 1908 and incorporates part of the earlier Athol Gardens Hotel Today the building has been fully restored caters for special functions and events particularly weddings. There is also a café which provides breakfast and lunch every day of the week.

== History of Athol Gardens Hotel ==
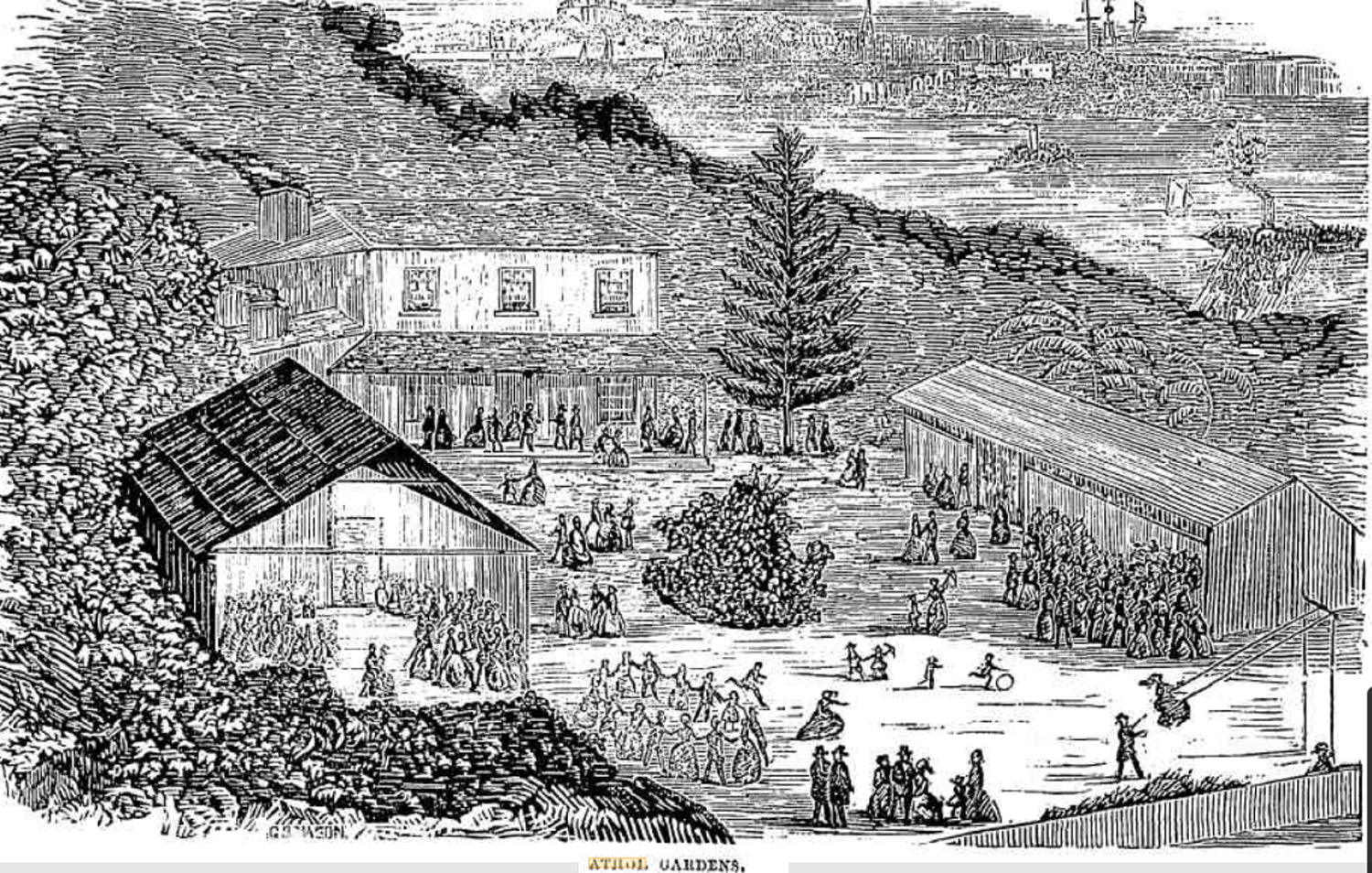
Athol Gardens Hotel 1871. The hotel (in the middle) is shown from the side. It extends back in a rectangular shape for about 45 feet with a verandah nearly the whole length.

Athol Gardens Hotel was originally a private residence which was a five roomed stone walled home called “Athol” built by the Ferrier family in about 1850. They leased the building to William Clark in the 1860s and he extended it and obtained a hotel licence. Dancing pavilions were also built close to the hotel. Australian Town and Country Journal visited the complex in 1871 and included a sketch in their newspaper which is shown. They said that “facilities were abundantly afforded by the proprietor whose energy and taste deserve the support of all who desire to enjoy a holiday at one of the most beautiful spots to be found on the shores of our magnificent harbour.

In the following year a tourist, William Clare Taylor, visited the hotel and described it in detail. He said:

"The hotel is about 45 feet frontage with a verandah nearly the whole length resting on plain white painted pillars. There is a well-furnished large parlour also a dining and sitting room. There are two saloons for dancing of wood with sloping roofs of shingle, one 100 feet by 25, the other 52 feet by 22 with apertures left on each side about 5 feet square in place of windows. The hotel is plastered over and painted white."

William Clark, the publican at this time, was born in Scotland in 1827. His father was Nicol Clark, a farmer. The family migrated to Australia in about 1840. In 1847 in Windsor he married Elizabeth Vicary and the couple went to live in Sydney. In the following year he opened a dancing studio in Pitt Street and gave lessons there for many years. The couple had seventeen children. They went to live at Athol gardens in about 1867.

In 1868 he was involved in a dramatic rescue which was widely reported in the newspapers. Four young boys were rowing near Athol Gardens when their boat capsized about 400 metres from shore. One managed to swim to safety but the other three clung to the keel. William Clark and his eldest son upon hearing their cries immediately unmoored a boat and managed to save them. The paper said that "Mr Clark with a sense of hospitality that deserves the greatest praise took them to his hotel, supplied them with a change of clothes and showed them every kindness during the night and the next morning they were safely landed at Double Bay."

== Later history ==
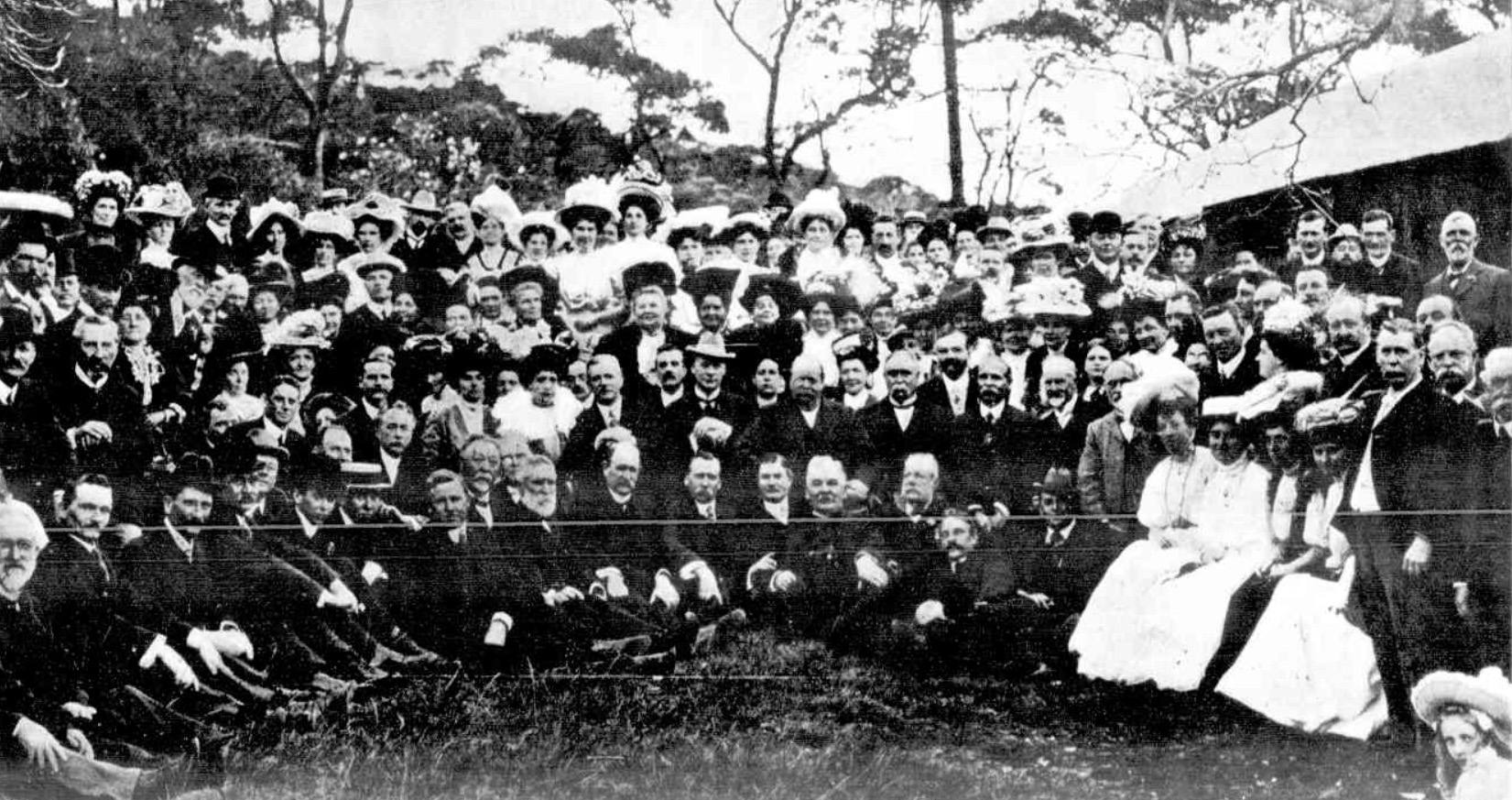
Large function held in Athol Gardens in 1908. Athol Hall is on the right

The business was advertised for sale in 1880 and bought by Joseph Taylor Coffill. However, by 1882 he and lost both the dancing and liquor licences but it remained popular as a Temperance Hotel. The premises seems to have regained permission for dancing a few years later as it was often mentioned during the 1890s that dancing was being held in the pavilion.

In 1906 Sydney Ferries Limited bought the hotel complex from the Ferrier family. Two years later they built Athol Hall incorporating some of the hotel structure. It was granted a licence in May 1908 to be a place of amusement. In September of the same year a large gathering of members of the Liberal and Reform Association held a function in Athol Gardens where afternoon tea was served. A photo of this event is shown. These types of large gatherings at the park were typical.

In 1911 the Government resumed the land so that improvements could be made. The hall continued to be used by the public for picnic events.

Today the Hall is managed by the NSW National Parks and Wildlife Service and is available as a venue for wedding receptions, wedding ceremonies, corporate events, private parties or other functions.
