= Alma House =

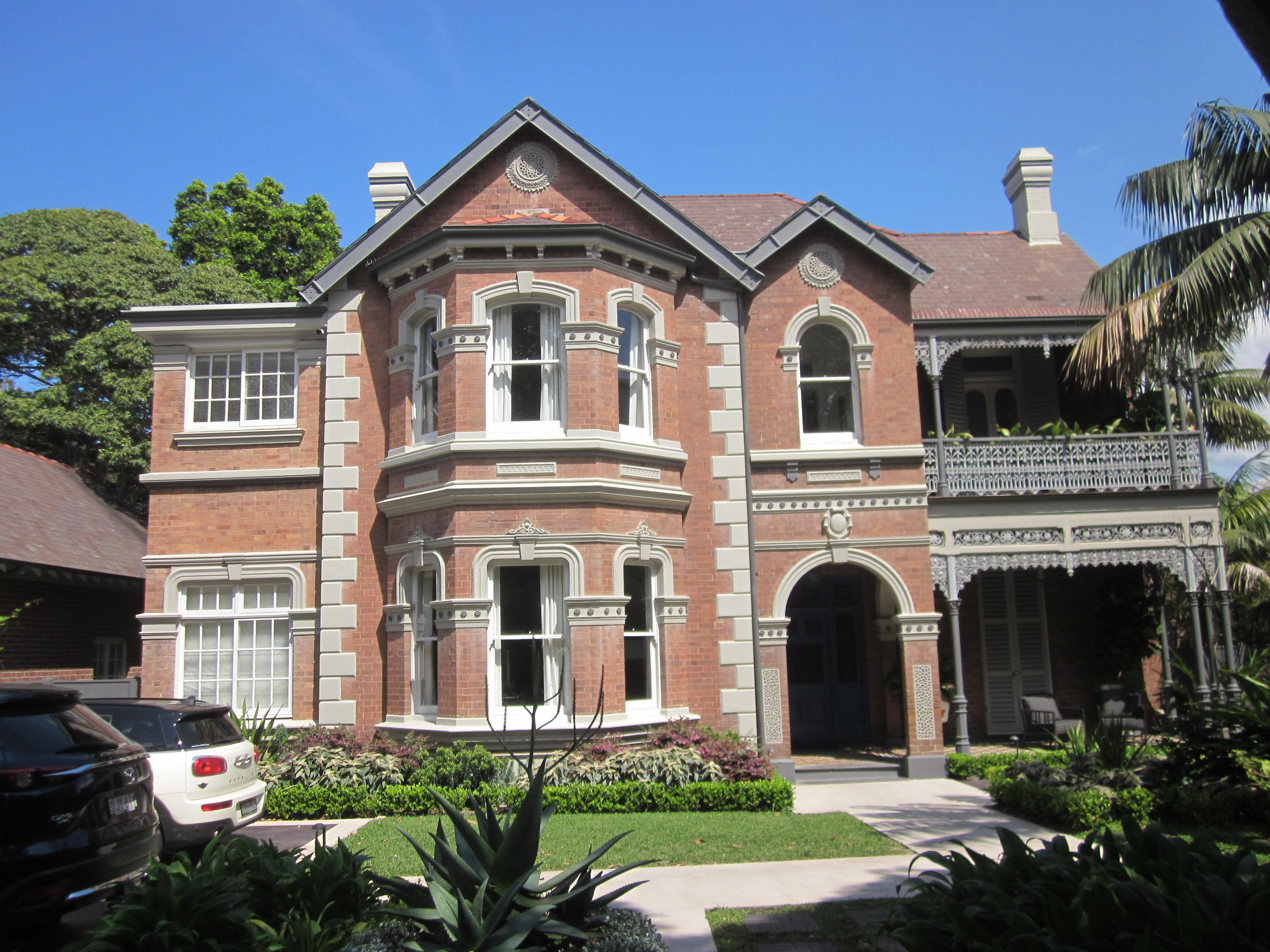
- Alma House, in September 2019
- Interactive map of the Alma House area

General information
- Status: Completed
- Type: House
- Architectural style: Victorian Italianate
- Location: 114 Belmont Road, Mosman, Mosman Council, New South Wales, Australia
- Coordinates: 33°49′39″S 151°13′56″E
- Completed: c. 1890s
- Client: Frederick Smith

Technical details
- Material: Brick
- Floor count: 2

New South Wales Heritage Register
- Official name: Alma House
- Type: State heritage (built)
- Designated: 2 April 1999
- Reference no.: 70
- Type: House
- Category: Residential buildings (private)

Alma House is a heritage-listed former childcare centre, nursing school and offices and now residence located at 114 Belmont Road, Mosman, New South Wales, a suburb of Sydney, Australia. The property is privately owned. It was added to the New South Wales State Heritage Register on 2 April 1999.

== History ==
Alma was constructed for Frederick Smith, a wealthy resident in the mid-1890s. In later years Miss Hutchinson established a nursing school in the building which may have been the first school of its type in the municipality. It was a corporate headquarters but sold in 2010 for A$3.6 million and is now a contemporary family home for six.

A 1914 newspaper article about Smith's estate, left through his will, noted its value was A£17,159, sworn in for probate. He appointed his sons Sidney, Arthur and Frederick and his daughter Frances executors and executrix and trustees of the estate. He bequeathed the furniture, ornaments, plate and effects at Alma to Frances, which furniture and effects were purchased with her own money. He gave his pony phaeton, harness and all other articles of a similar nature to Frances. The house occupied by his son Frederick in Chuter Street, North Sydney (now McMahons Point), testator left to Frederick on trust to receive the benefits, rents, etc., until his death, when it goes to his children. He left the poetry at the corner of Alexander and Atchinson Streets, North Sydney in trust to his son Francis, and the property in Glover Street in trust to his son Arthur for life, both on the same terms as that to Frederick. He left certain property at Careel Bay, Pittwater to his son-in-law Harold Trotman Howard, and the remainder of his Careel Bay property to all of testator's children as joint tenants. He left A£30 to the North Shore Hospital, an annuity of A£200 to his daughter Frances, one of A£150 to his friend Rosalie Grigg and one of A£50 to his daughter Isabella, now Isabella Reed. The residue of real and personal estate to be held in trust for the children after due provision for mortgages, etc. A codicil to the will revoked the provision appointing trustees, executors and executrix and appointed in their place his son-in-law, Harold Trotman Howard, in conjunction with testator's son Arthur and daughter Frances. He further provided that in the event of Rosalie Grigg predeceasing his daughter Frances the annuity of A£150 should go to Frances, while that of A£50 payable to Isabella Reed is to go to the daughter May Howard, in the event of the annuitant predeceasing May Howard.

== Description ==
The garden is set in large grounds.

The house is completed in the late Victorian Italianate style. Large two-storey face brick Victorian Italianate style residence with slate roof. The house features a two-storey window bay with cement rendered mouldings and quoins. The entry porch has a large arch and opens to the two-storey cast iron verandah on the west.

On the eastern side is a two-storey brick addition with a flat roof. Details have been matched to the original building and the addition maintains a benign quality even though it is located in a prominent position. There is a further two-storey shingled, gabled addition on the north west.

== Heritage listing ==
As at 2 December 2016, Alma is historically significant for its association with the establishment of substantial residences in Mosman in the 1880s and also with its use as an early nursing school. It is aesthetically significant as a good example of Italianate architecture with sympathetic additions, and is prominent in the streetscape.

Alma House was listed on the New South Wales State Heritage Register on 2 April 1999.

== See also ==
- Australian residential architectural styles
