= 42 Cowles Road, Mosman =

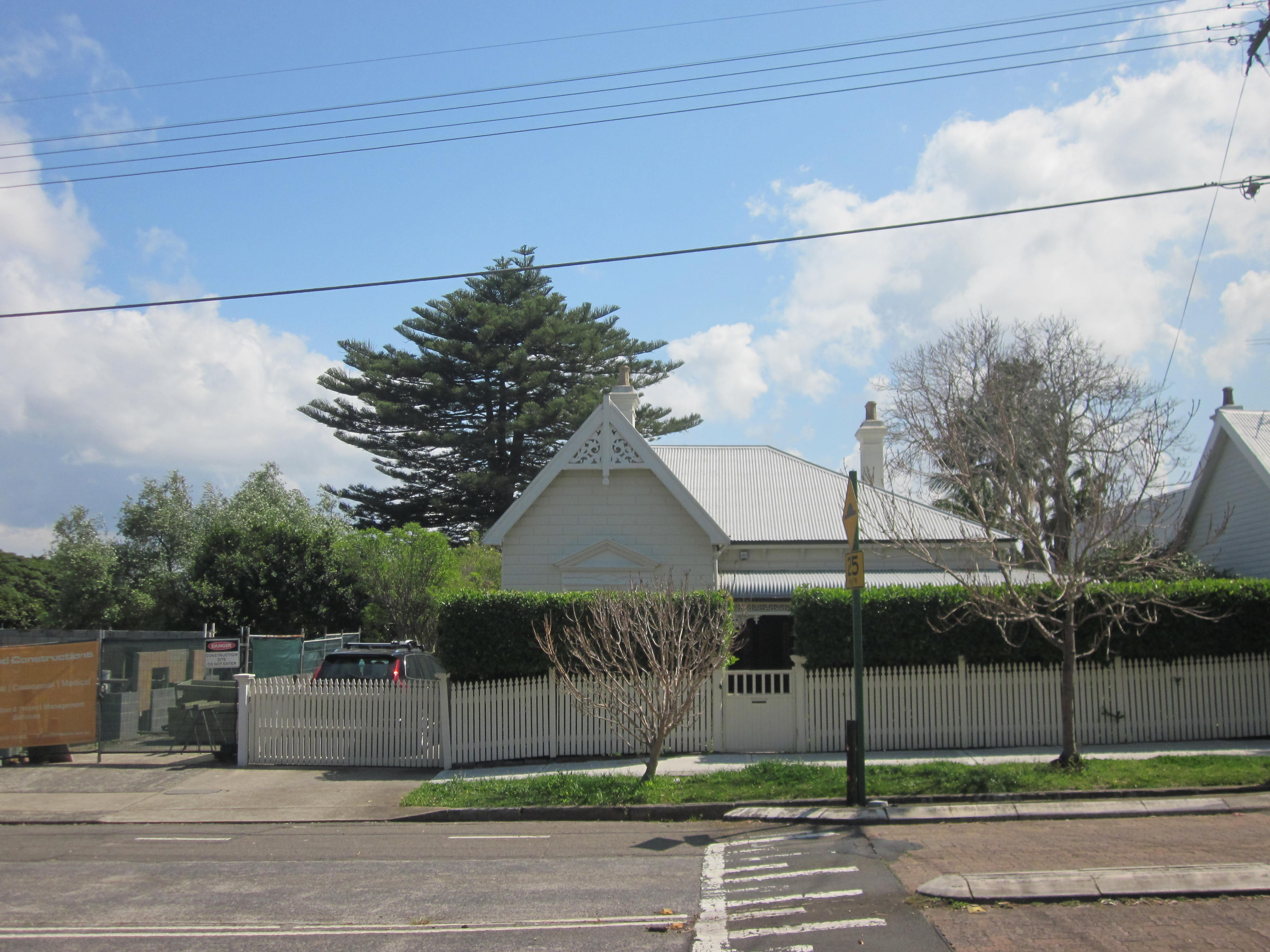
- 42 Cowles Road, Mosman, New South Wales

- Location within Sydney Location within Australia
- 33°49′39″S 151°14′15″E
- Location: 42 Cowles Road, Mosman, Mosman Council, New South Wales, Australia

History
- Built: c. 1890

New South Wales Heritage Register
- Official name: 42 Cowles Road, Mosman; Building; Shadwell
- Type: State heritage (built)
- Designated: 2 April 1999
- Reference no.: 430
- Type: Historic site
- Category: Residential dwelling

42 Cowles Road is a heritage-listed historic residence located in the Sydney suburb of Mosman, New South Wales, Australia. The house is also known as Shadwell. It was added to the New South Wales State Heritage Register on 2 April 1999.

== Description ==
Located behind high hedges and picket fences, this family home with traditional corrugated iron roofing, bull-nosed return verandah and iron-lace embellishments, with wide entry, high ceilings, original polished floors and fireplaces.

== Heritage listing ==
42 Cowles Road, Mosman was listed on the New South Wales State Heritage Register on 2 April 1999.

== See also ==
- Australian residential architectural styles
