= Igloo House =

Heritage-listed dwelling in Sydney, New South Wales, Australia

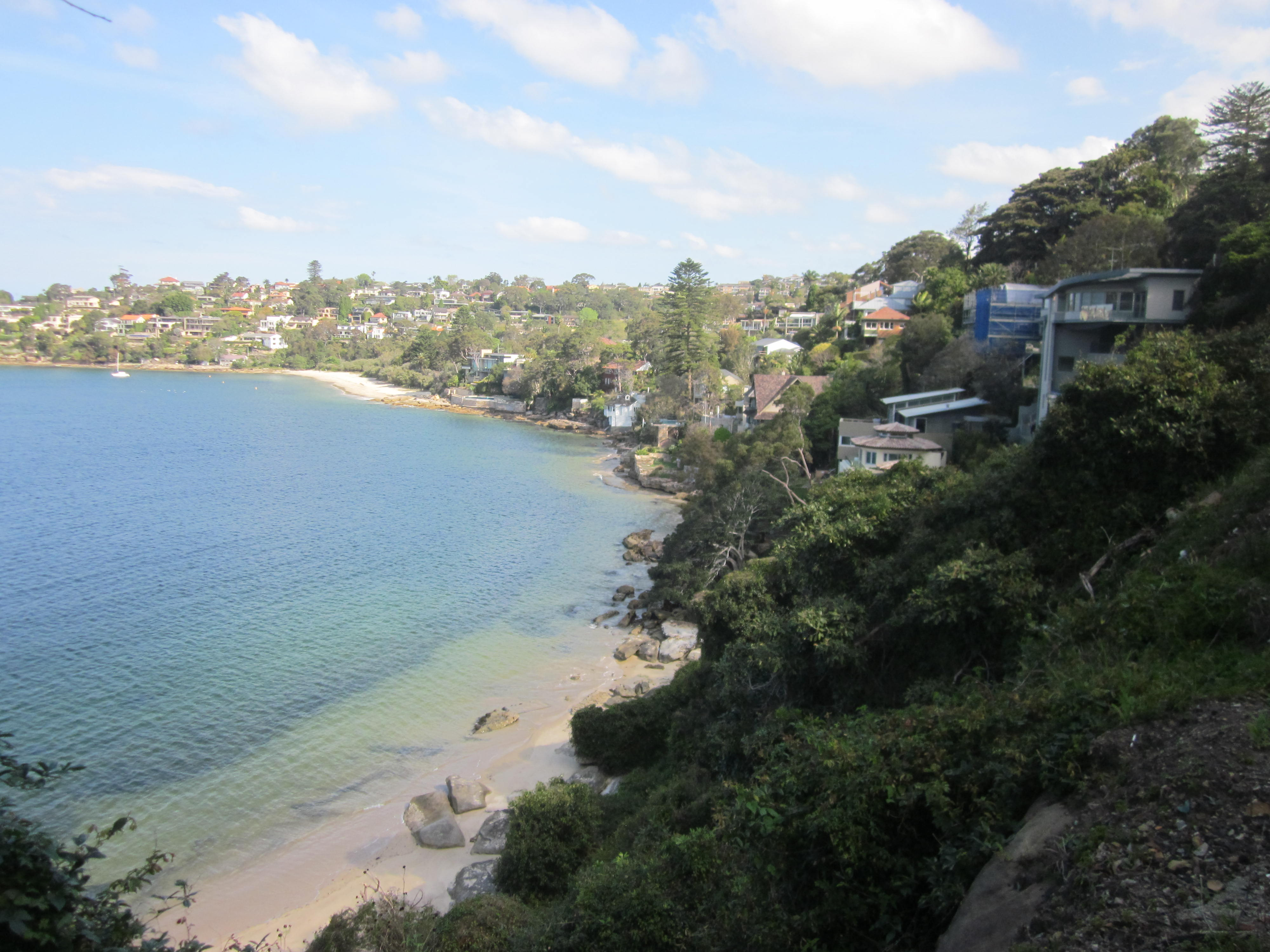
- Igloo House during restoration in 2019. The house is in the upper right of the photo, covered in blue plastic

- Location of the house in Sydney
- 33°48′40″S 151°14′48″E
- Location: 65 Parriwi Road, Mosman, Mosman Council, New South Wales, Australia

History
- Built: 1952–1953
- Built for: George Laurence Williamson

Site notes
- Architect: Harry Seidler

New South Wales Heritage Register
- Official name: Igloo House, The; Williamson House
- Type: State heritage (built)
- Designated: 1 November 2002
- Reference no.: 1652
- Type: House
- Category: Residential buildings (private)
- Builders: G. L. Williamson

The Igloo House is a heritage-listed dwelling located at 65 Parriwi Road, Mosman, New South Wales, a suburb of Sydney, Australia. It was designed by Harry Seidler and built from 1952 to 1953 by G. L. Williamson. It is also known as Williamson House. It was added to the New South Wales State Heritage Register on 1 November 2002.

== History ==
The site was purchased by George Laurence Williamson, a solicitor who emigrated from Britain in the late 1940s. In 1951 he commissioned the design from the innovative architect, Harry Seidler. The innovative engineering design, utilising concrete slabs on piers, was undertaken by Peter Owen Miller. The house was built in 1952–1953 by Williamson as owner-builder using various tradesmen. Outfitting of the house appeared to continue for some time after this. Williamson sold the house in 1970 and subsequent owners have modified it since then, though retaining the basic structures.

== Description ==
Unusual twin-arched garages and light concrete body set on poles on the waterfront cliff. It was designed by Harry Seidler in 1951. A distinguishing characteristic is a double-arched garage roof offset against a concrete wall, with a backdrop looking towards Sydney Heads. The first Australian house to use flat-slab construction, with special concrete developed by a Sydney engineer, Peter Miller, that did away with heavy foundations. The house has been subject to several alterations since construction.

=== Condition ===
As at 1 November 2002, the physical condition is good. Mostly intact, with modifications.

=== Modifications and dates ===
Modifications - probably mainly undertaken in the 1970s:

- Garage doors and glass panels replaced with painted timber walls.
- Sun deck enclosed with metal roof.
- Wrought iron bars on street-front (west) strip windows.
- Replacement of entrance area railings.
- Bronze-frame window on north replaced.
- New enclosed floor added under house.
- Bronze sliding doors on east front replaced and glazing relocated to outer edge.
- Window cleaning gantry on east front.
- Repainted from original colours.
- Swimming pool and cabana built on lower part of site.

On 18 July 2019, Penelope Seidler, in a conversation with Lucy Feagins, of The Design Files, advised Feagins that "the Igloo House, Mosman is an exciting new restoration project in Sydney that Harry Seidler & Associates are currently working on."

== Heritage listing ==
As at 21 July 2011, Igloo House, dating from 1951, was of State aesthetic significance as an important early example of modern house design in Australia, which is innovative in its use of structural technology. It is significant for its association with its designer, leading Australian architect Harry Seidler, who had been a teenage refugee from Nazi oppression in the 1930s and who had trained as an architect in Canada before coming to Australia in 1948 to design a house for his immigrant parents. Igloo House is thus also a demonstration of the contribution of immigrant culture to Australia.

Igloo House was listed on the New South Wales State Heritage Register on 1 November 2002 having satisfied the following criteria.

The place is important in demonstrating the course, or pattern, of cultural or natural history in New South Wales.

As a fine and technologically innovative example of modern architectural design, Igloo House is of historical significance for its contribution to post-war architectural culture in Australia.

The place has a strong or special association with a person, or group of persons, of importance of cultural or natural history of New South Wales's history.

Associated with Harry Seidler, its designer, who had been a teenage refugee from Nazi oppression in the 1930s and who had trained as an architect in Canada before coming to Australia in 1948 to design a house for his immigrant parents. Seidler, who remained in Australia and became one of the country's leading and most influential architects, demonstrates the contribution of immigrant culture to Australia.

The place is important in demonstrating aesthetic characteristics and/or a high degree of creative or technical achievement in New South Wales.

Igloo House is of aesthetic significance as an outstanding technical and design achievement, as an iconic example of modern architecture in Australia.

The place has potential to yield information that will contribute to an understanding of the cultural or natural history of New South Wales.

The item is a significant technological benchmark.

The place possesses uncommon, rare or endangered aspects of the cultural or natural history of New South Wales.

The item is rare and highly regarded as an influential example in Australia of innovative domestic design and construction.

The place is important in demonstrating the principal characteristics of a class of cultural or natural places/environments in New South Wales.

The item is representative of an innovative, modern approach to the design of domestic architecture in Australia after World War II.

== See also ==
- Australian residential architectural styles
