= Mosman =

- Suburb
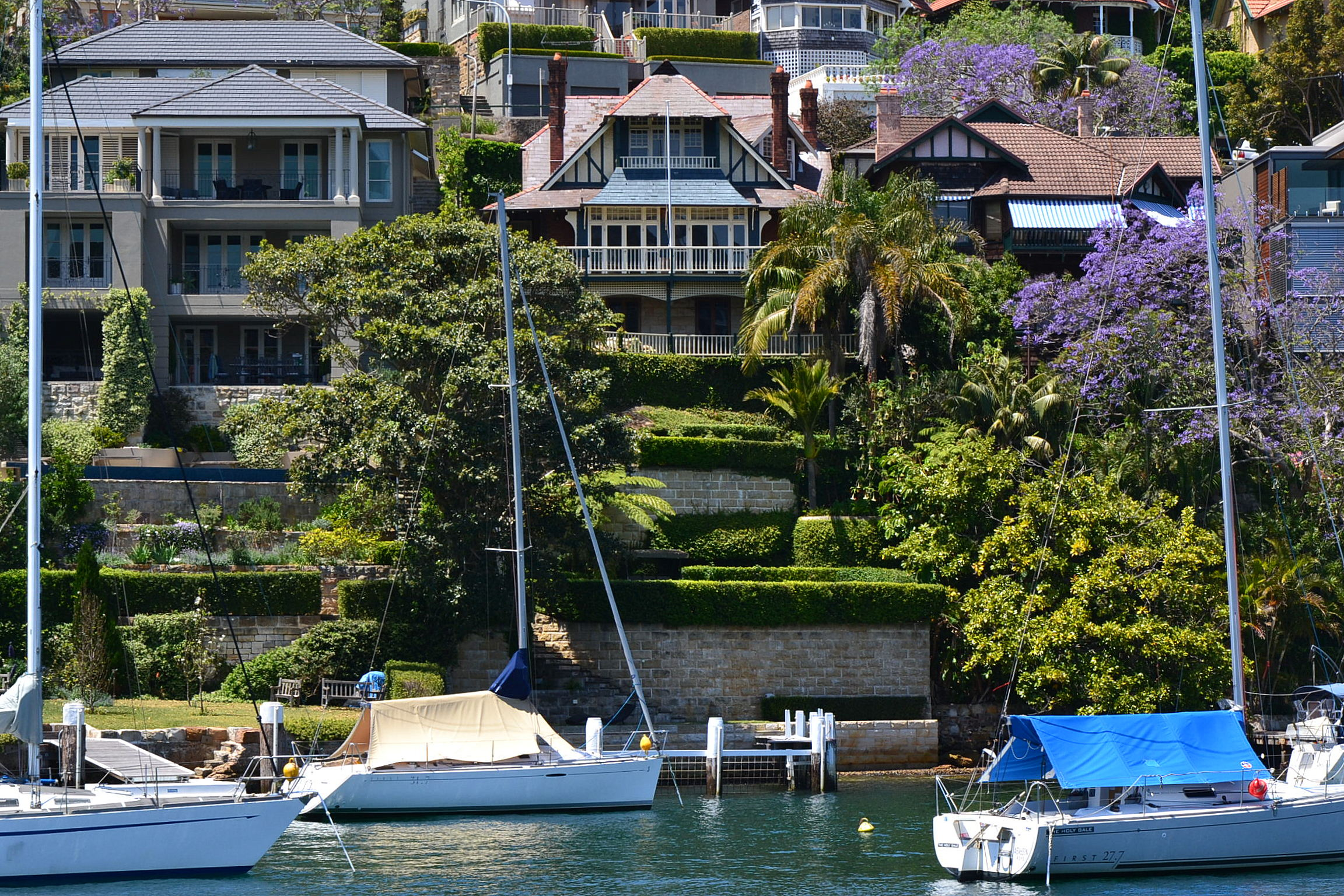
- View of Mosman from the Mosman ferry

- Interactive map of Mosman
- Country: Australia
- State: New South Wales
- City: Sydney
- LGA: Mosman Council
- Location: 8 km (5.0 mi) NE of Sydney CBD

Government
  - State electorate: North Shore
  - Federal division: Warringah

Area
  - Total: 8.7 km^{2} (3.4 sq mi)
- Elevation: 79 m (259 ft)

Population
  - Total: 28,329 (SAL 2021)
- Postcode: 2088
Suburbs around Mosman
Northbridge	Seaforth	Clontarf
Cremorne	Mosman
Cremorne Point

Mosman is a suburb on the Lower North Shore region of Sydney, in the state of New South Wales, Australia. Mosman is located 8 kilometres north-east of the Sydney central business district and is the administrative centre for the local government area of the Municipality of Mosman.

== Localities ==
In February 1997, a notice was published in the Government Gazette by Mosman Council advising that they had assigned Mosman as the only suburb in the Mosman Local Government Area. However, Mosman Council decided that residents should continue to be allowed to use the following traditional locality names if they wished:

- Balmoral
- Beauty Point
- Clifton Gardens
- Georges Heights
- Spit Junction
- The Spit

== History ==
Mosman is named after Archibald Mosman (1799–1863) and his twin brother George, who moved onto a 4-acre (16,000 m^{2}) land grant in the area in 1831. They were involved in shipping, and founded a whaling station on a bay in the harbour, which became known as Mosman's Bay. George subsequently became involved in grazing, but Archibald continued with whaling activities. By 1838, he owned 108 acres (0.44 km^{2}) along the Mosman waterfront. Archibald was buried in the cemetery of St Jude's Church, Randwick. His grave is maintained by Mosman Council.

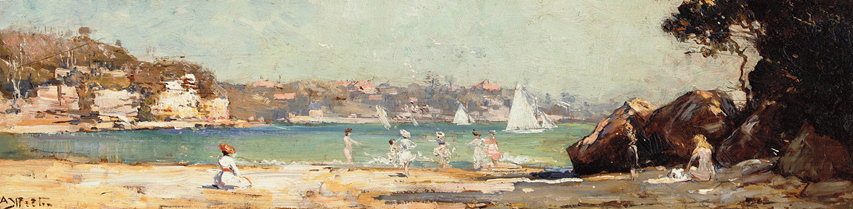
Arthur Streeton, Mosman's Bay, 1914

=== Aboriginal culture ===
Mosman was originally inhabited by the Borogegal tribe. Bungaree (c. 1775–1830) was a well known Aboriginal who joined British explorers on voyages, including circumnavigating Australia with Matthew Flinders when he was 26. He later became leader of his tribe, was given land at Georges Head, and enjoyed the patronage of Governor Lachlan Macquarie. He greeted newcomers whose ships entered Port Jackson, and became acquainted with Russian and French explorers. His image was painted many times and shown in London, Paris, and Moscow.

=== European settlement ===
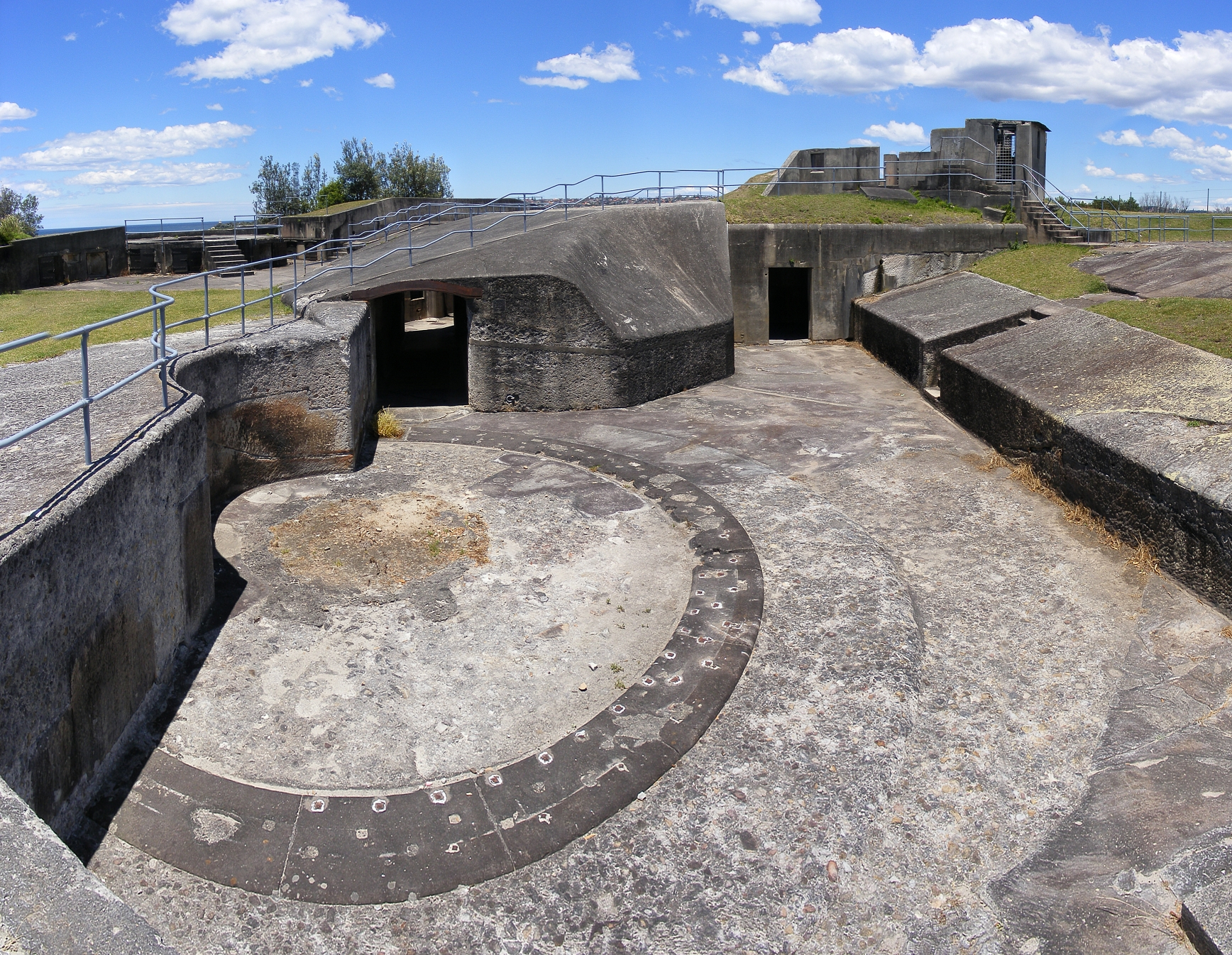
A gun emplacement at Middle Head Fort

In 1789 HMS Sirius—the flagship of the First Fleet—entered what is now known as Mosman Bay or Great Sirius Cove. Mosman has been the site of important maritime and defence installations for Sydney since 1801, especially when Sydney's Harbour defences were expanded with the construction of Middle Head Fort, Georges Head Battery and Bradleys Head Fortification Complex. In 1871 the Beehive Casemate was constructed into the cliff side on Obelisk Bay.

A Submarine Miners' Depot was constructed at Chowder Bay (Georges Head) in the 1880s. In 1888 the site was modified for the latest in harbour defences. The site was a strategic position and considered the best place to observe and fire mines which were laid underwater. Minefields were laid across the main shipping channels of Port Jackson from 1876 to 1922 and a base was built at Chowder Bay for the submarine miners (Clifton Gardens). From Georges Head, miners watched for ships entering the harbour. Their job was to explode the mine closest to an approaching enemy ship. Each underwater mine was attached to an electric cable that ran up the cliff to the firing post. During a demonstration in 1891, a crowd of several thousand people watched as a fatal accident killed four miners and injured another eight.

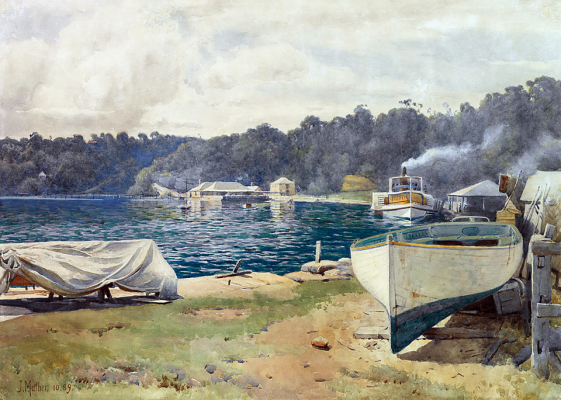
Mosman's Bay by John Mather, 1889

In the 1880s and 1890s, as a result of the enthusiasm for painting en plein air fostered by the Barbizon and Impressionist movements in France, art colonies known as the Sydney artists' camps flourished around the harbour, mainly in the Mosman area. As a result, Mosman became known as "Australia's most painted suburb". Notable painters in this community included Julian Ashton, Tom Roberts, Arthur Streeton and John Mather. One such camp was known as Curlew Camp and was situated in Little Sirius Cove. An inscription on a rock can still be seen on the east side of the cove: Curlew 1890.

In 1942 during the Second World War the Sydney Harbour anti-submarine boom net was constructed on Georges Head and was designed to prevent enemy submarines from entering into Sydney Harbour. The boom net spanned the entire width of Port Jackson and a boom net winch house was located on Liangs Point, Watsons Bay. On the night of 31 May 1942, three Japanese midget submarines attempted to enter Sydney Harbour in what became known as the attack on Sydney Harbour. One of the Japanese midget submarines became entangled in the boom net and after unsuccessful attempts by the crew to free the submarine they detonated charges within the sub, killing themselves and destroying their sub in the process.

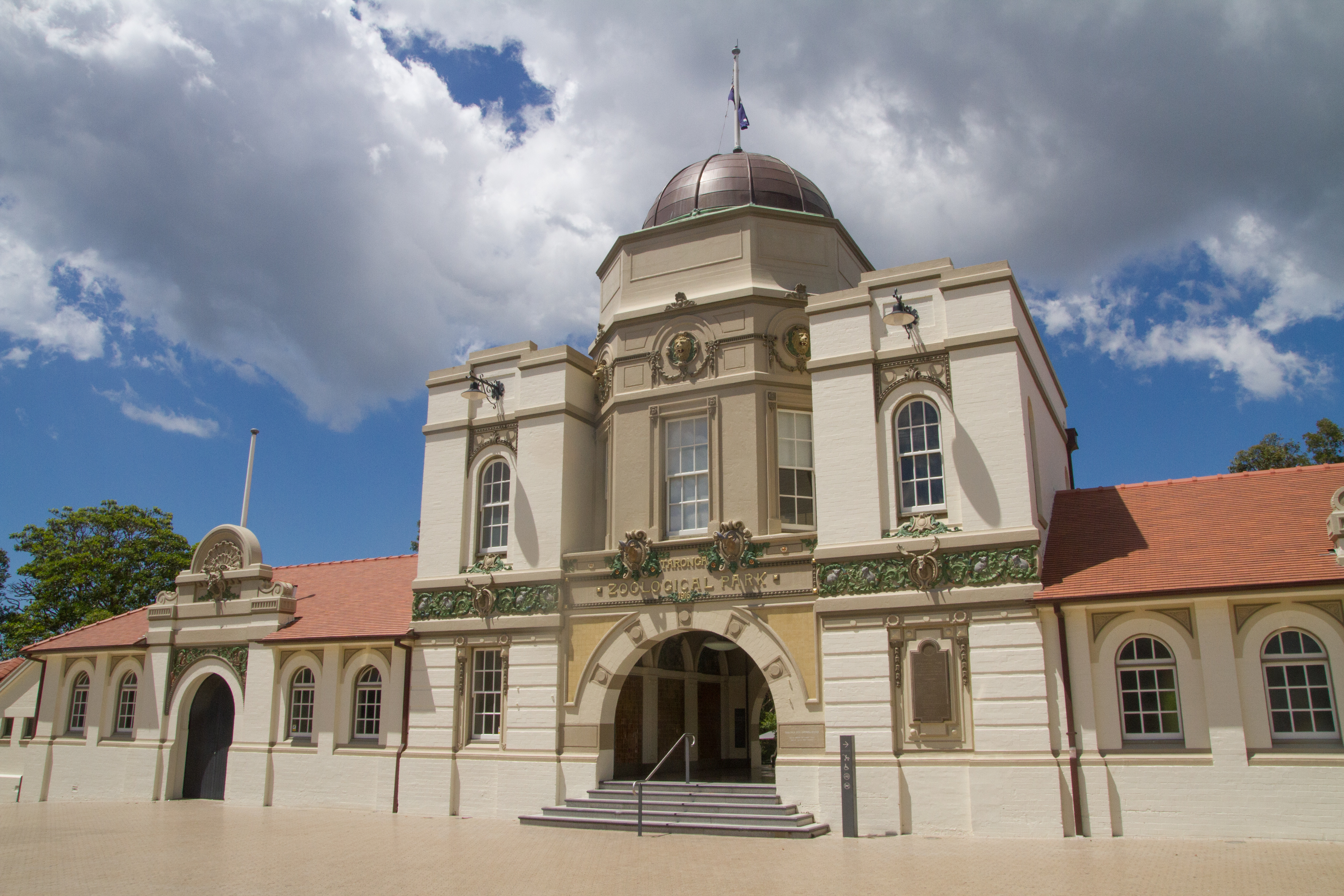
The 1916 James Barry Zoo entrance building

Chowder Bay was used in the late 1820s as an anchorage for visiting American whaling ships. In 1831 Archibald Mosman and John Bell were allotted grants of land in Mosman Bay to establish a whaling station. The only remaining building of the original whaling station is The Barn on Avenue Road. The Barn was a store and sail-drying house. It is now the home of the 1st Mosman 1908 Scout Group.

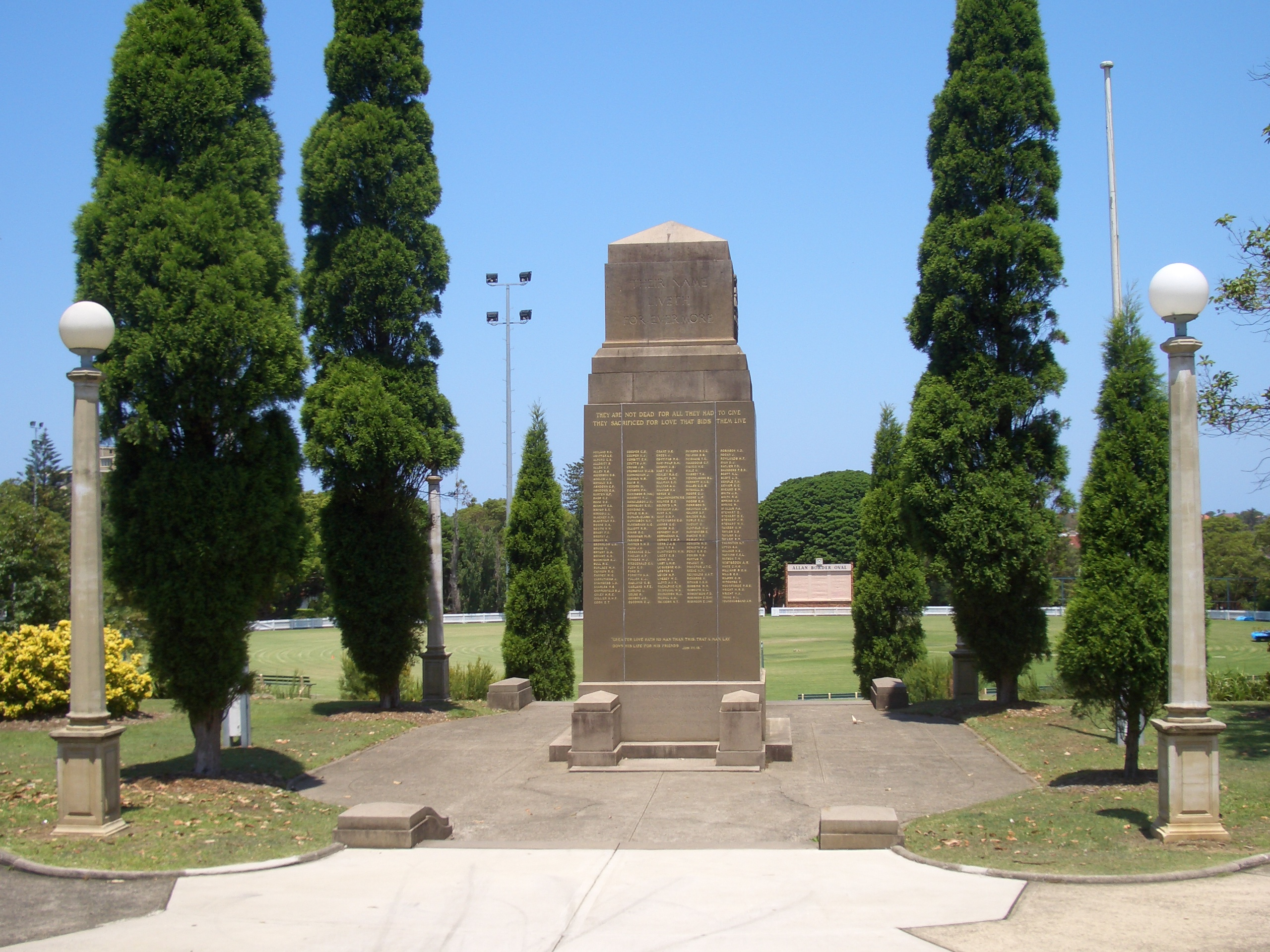
Mosman War Memorial, designed by Peter Kaad, and Allan Border Oval

A foot track ran from North Sydney to Middle Head in the 1840s. Avenue Road which ran from Mosman Bay to Mosman Junction was constructed in 1860 with Military Road, Middle Head Road, and Bradleys Head Road all constructed ten years later. From the 1870s, land development spread settlement east from Milson's Point, including to the Mosman area, which was boosted with a regular ferry service around the same time. Richard Harnett Senior purchased Archibald Mosman's original 108 acres (0.44 km^{2}) in 1859 and in 1878 established a sandstone quarry at Mosman Bay. In 1871, he built a wharf and subsidised a ferry service between Mosman Bay, Neutral Bay, and Circular Quay. He promoted a land development known as the Mosman Bay Estate; when the land was sold, the ferry service was cancelled, much to the annoyance of the new landowners. His son, Richard Harnett Junior, was the first Mayor elected when Mosman became a municipality in 1893 with 1,600 residents, breaking away from the North Sydney municipality. Both men were major influences in Mosman and were responsible for building many roads, a horse-drawn bus service and ferry services linking Mosman to the city. Mosman Public School opened in 1880.

Around the start of the 20th century, rows of shops and Federation architecture homes were built. Taronga Zoo opened in 1916, moving from a site at Moore Park that had been in use since 1884. Taronga is an Aboriginal word for 'beautiful view'. From the late 1950s, multi-storey flat developments began and became a public concern, leading to controls and restrictions being introduced.

On 21 June 1966, Mosman Town Hall was the scene of the attempted assassination of federal opposition leader Arthur Calwell.

A 6-inch naval gun was mounted at the Lower Georges Heights Battery in Mosman in 2006 to replicate one of the historic coastal guns that defended Sydney Harbour in the early 1900s. This installation is part of the extensive military fortifications which overlook Sydney Harbour, and are now managed by the Harbour Trust.

== Landmarks ==
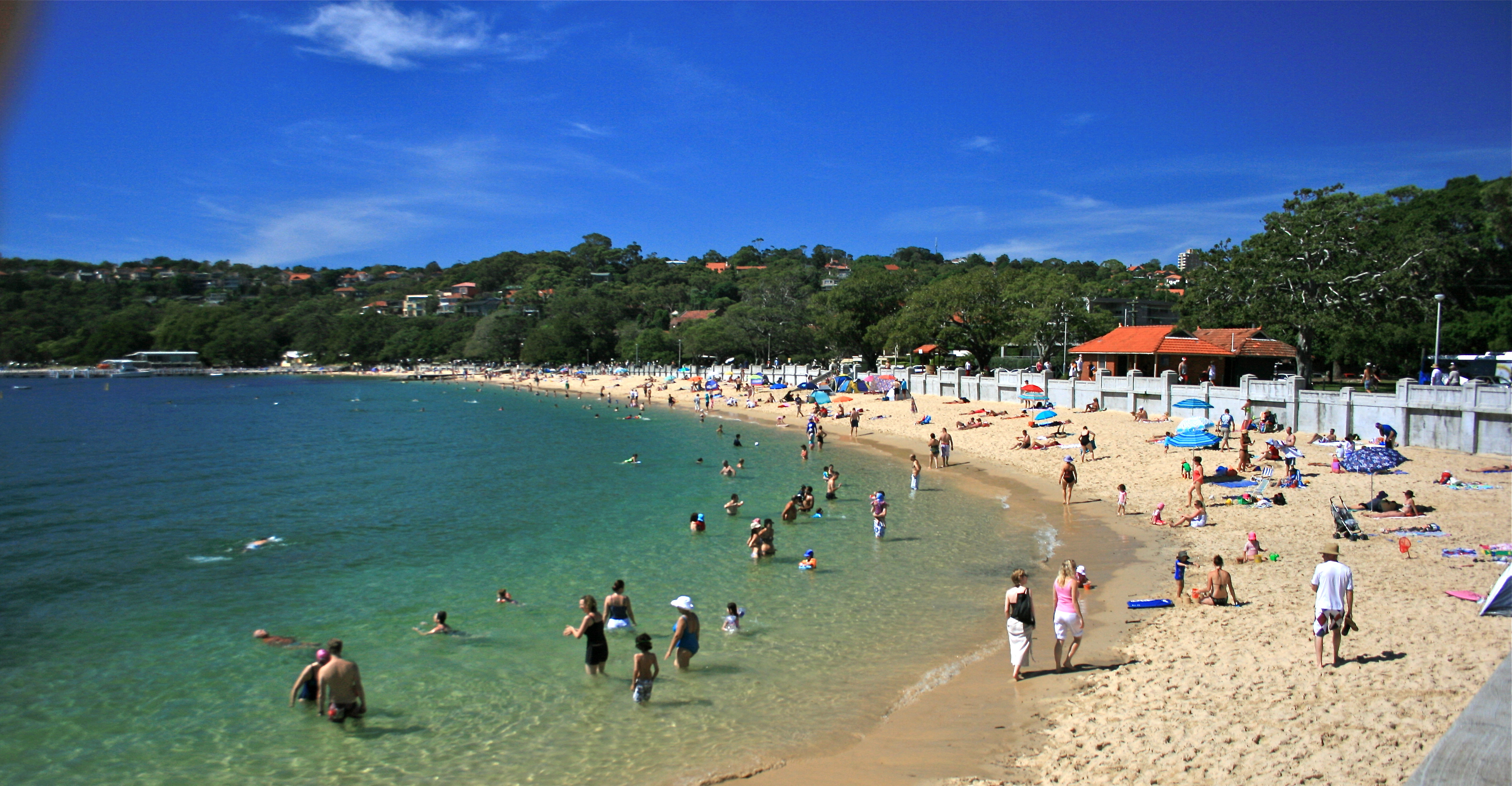
Balmoral Beach

Mosman forms a peninsula between Sydney Harbour and Middle Harbour. It features a number of harbour beaches, including Balmoral, Chinamans Beach and two legally-designated clothing optional beaches: Obelisk Beach and Cobblers Beach. Other attractions include Taronga Zoo, Bradleys Head and sections of Sydney Harbour National Park. Overlooking the harbour, in Rawson Park, is the Scotland Australia Cairn comprising a stone sourced from every parish in Scotland. It is a memorial to the Scottish pioneers who contributed much to Australia and was a gift from Scotland at the time of the Bicentennial Celebrations in 1988. Highland games are held there, usually the day after St Andrew's Day celebrations. On the eastern shore of Sirius Cove is the site of Curlew Camp where artists such as Arthur Streeton and Tom Roberts once resided. The council has recently constructed the Curlew Camp Artists Walk. Ashton Park is a popular attraction and includes Athol Hall which provides a venue for events and has a café which is open seven days a week.

== Heritage listings ==
Heritage-listed sites in Mosman include:

- Avenue Road: Mosman Bay Sewage Aqueduct
- 3a Avenue Road: The Barn, Scout Hall
- 114 Belmont Road: Alma House
- Bradleys Head Road (within Sydney Harbour NP): Bradleys Head Fortification Complex
- 34 Bullecourt Avenue: Woolley House
- 42 Cowles Road: 42 Cowles Road, Mosman
- 28 Mistral Avenue: 28 Mistral Avenue, Mosman
- 65 Parriwi Road: Igloo House
- Mosman's first large home—'The Nest'—was built in 1833.
- Oswald Bloxsome built 'The Rangers' in 1844—a mansion on 16 hectares (40 acres) overlooking Mosman Bay.
- Boronia House, built in 1885, has had a variety of uses including as the former municipal library. It is listed on the New South Wales State Heritage Register.
- Monterey, built in 1905 above Mosman Bay, is a grand 3-storey boarding house, initially called Branxholm. After being purchased in a derelict state by a Mr W. Baker, the building was restored for use as a restaurant and private hotel. In the 1980s, it was divided into a number of upmarket units. It is listed on the New South Wales State Heritage Register.
- The Manor, at a harbourside location near Clifton Gardens, is a large mansion loosely in the Federation style. Built c. 1911 by a Mr Bakewell as an eight-room cottage, it grew to over thirty rooms, most of which were lined with beaten copper. It was known locally as Bakewell's Folly. In the 1920s, the Theosophical Society rented and then purchased The Manor, which was regarded as a great "occult forcing-house". It became an important centre for the Society and is still used by them today. The English writer Mary Lutyens, who stayed at The Manor in the 1920s, described it as "a huge and hideous villa."
- Avenue Cottage, in Avenue Road, is a small cottage made of sandstone. It was built by Thomas Flew in 1886 and stayed in the Flew family until 1935. It is listed on the local government heritage register.
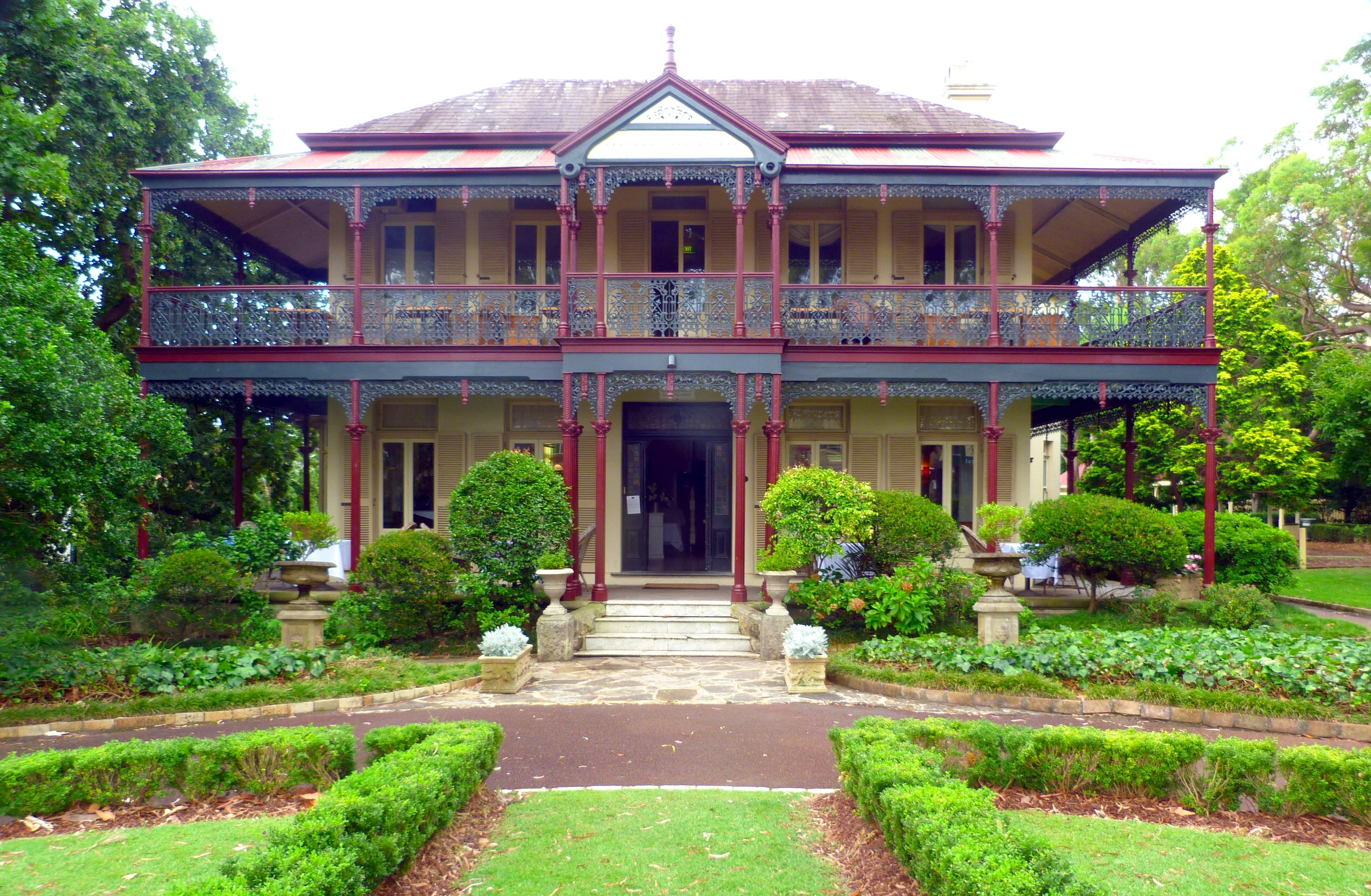
Boronia House, built in 1885

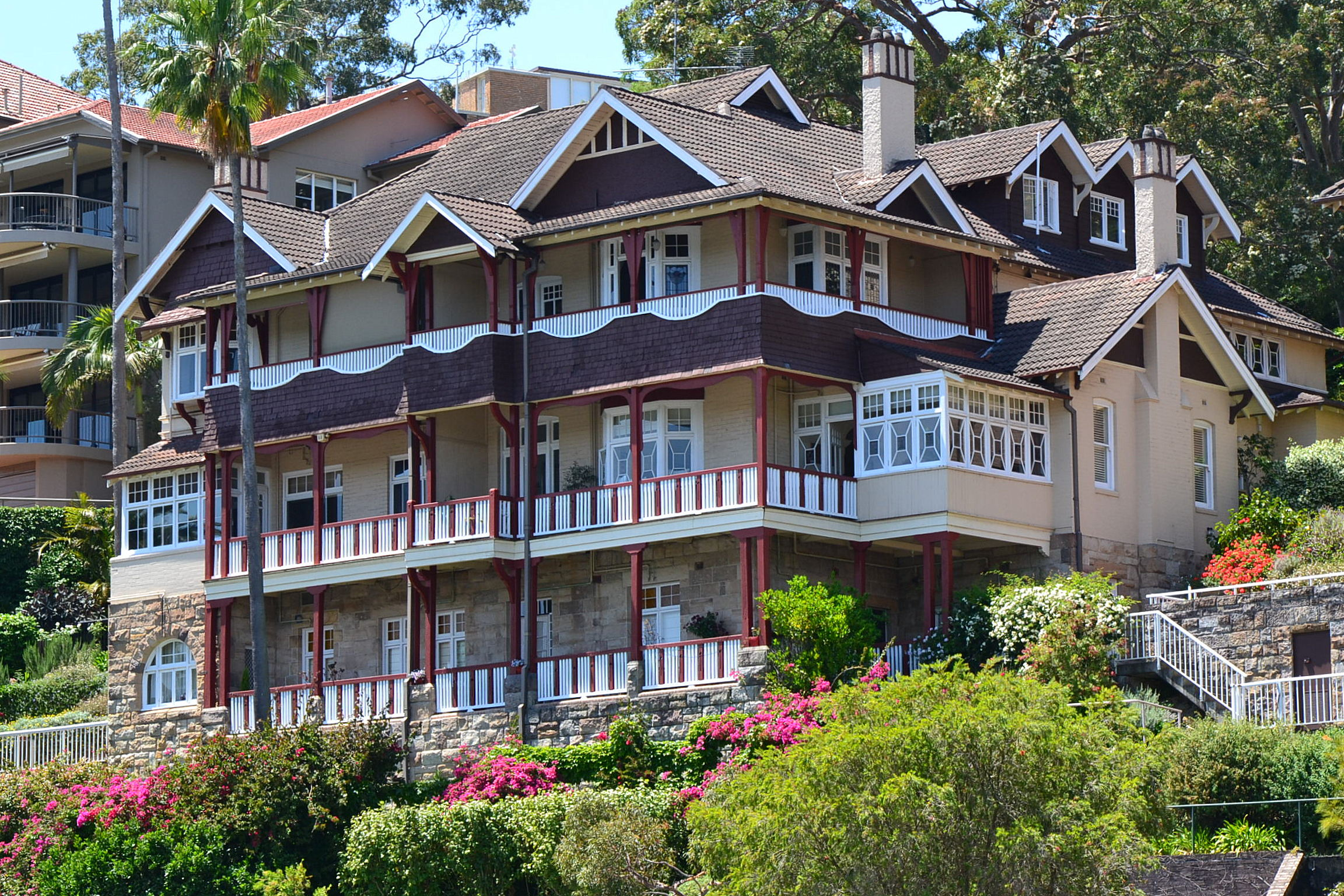
Monterey

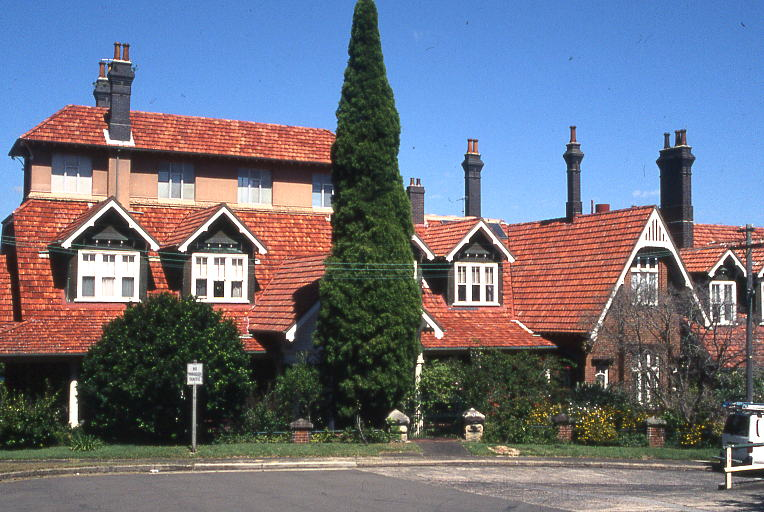
The Manor

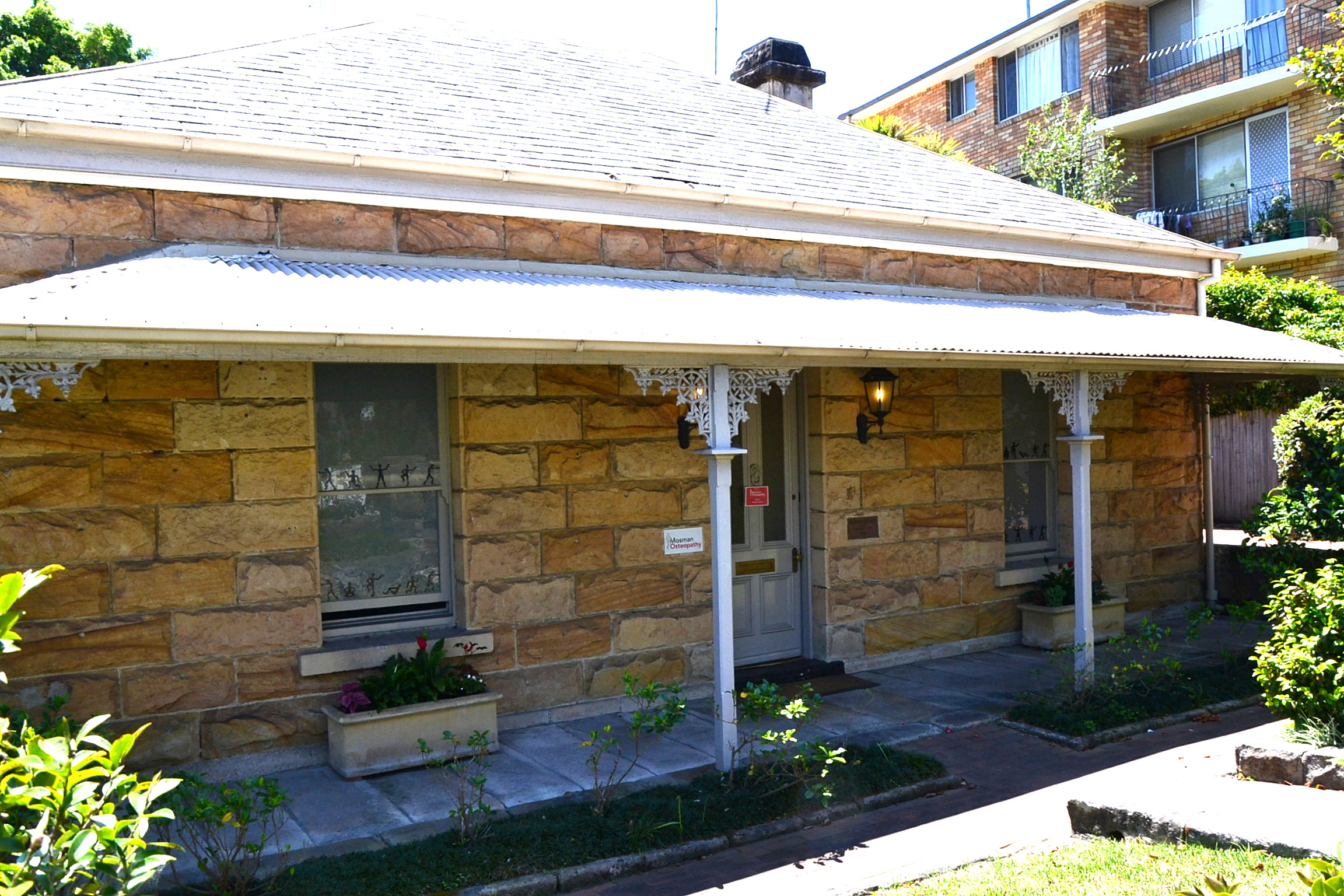
Avenue Cottage

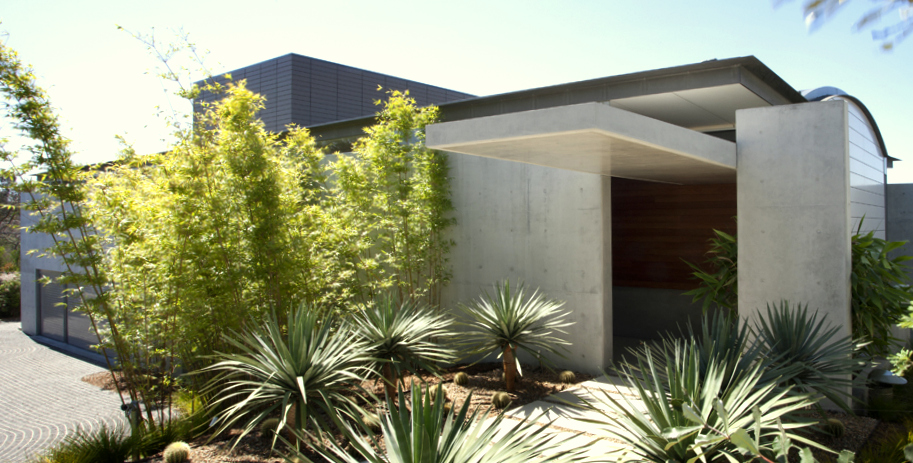
Contemporary Mosman home

Average house prices in Mosman are among the highest in Australia. In August 2024, the median purchase prices ranged from $785 thousand for a 1-bedroom unit to $7.95 million for a 5-bedroom house, average rents for a one-bedroom unit were $568 per week.

=== Commercial area ===
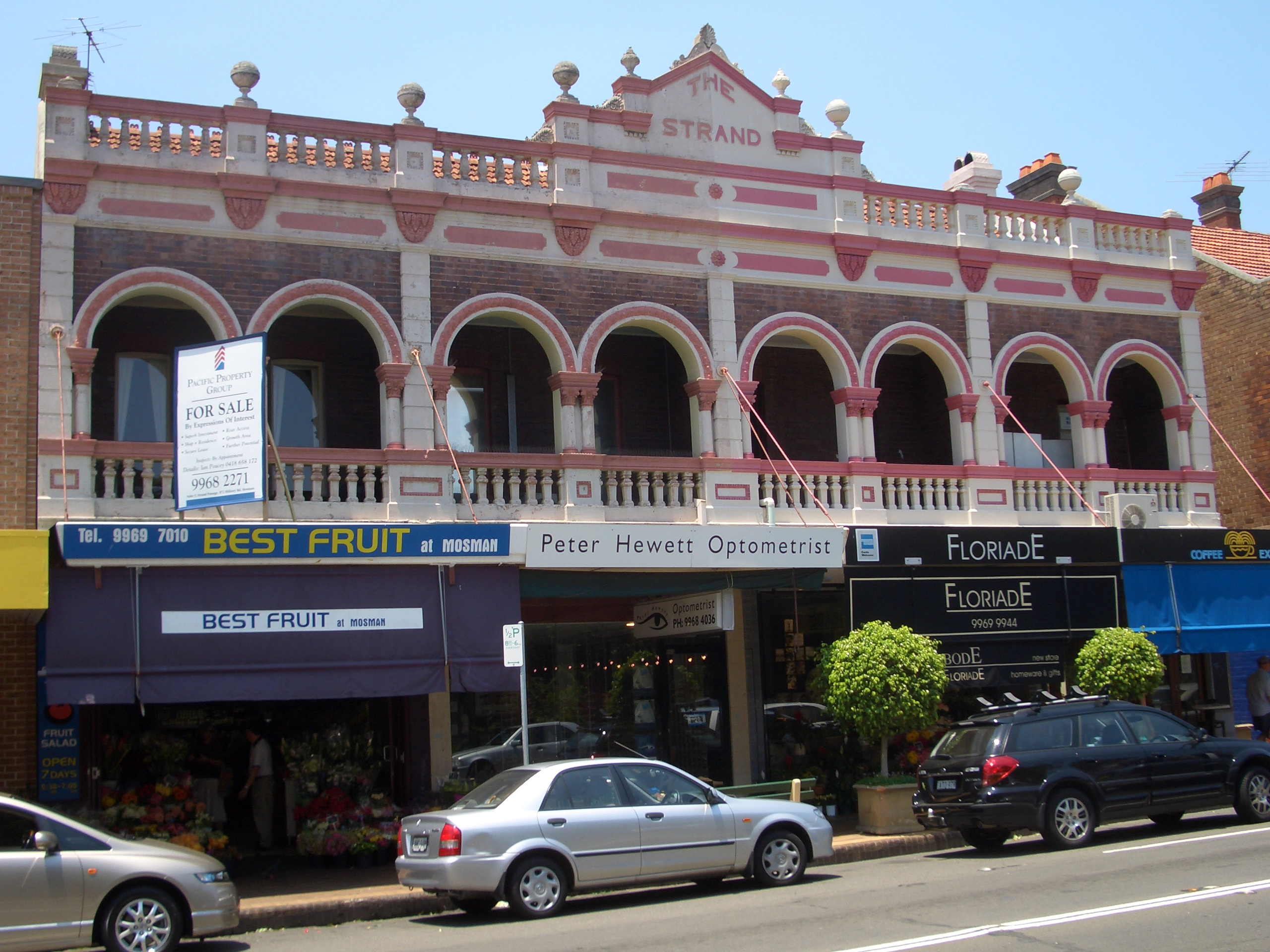
"The Strand" on the conservation area shopping strip.

Mosman's shopping centre is located along Military Road, which features many boutiques, cafes and restaurants. The shopping centre extends from the intersection with Bradley's Head Road and Middle Head Road and continues north up past the intersection with Spit Road at Spit Junction. It continues for some distance along both Spit Road and Military Road and extends down some of the side streets. Mosman Council has identified the early 20th century shopping strip along Military Road as a conservation area. The awnings along the street were originally column-supported. A small shopping mall called Bridgepoint is located at Spit Junction. The Military Road Conservation Area also includes the row of shops at 581-595 Military Road, on the southern side of Military Road between the Town Hall and the Library Walk shopping complex. These shops, built from 1900 to 1904, were designed by Henry Austin Wilshire, and are included on the NSW Heritage database.

== Demographics ==
At the 2021 census, the suburb of Mosman recorded a population of 28,329. Of these:

Age distribution
The distribution of ages in Mosman was older than the country as a whole. Mosman residents' median age was 45 years, compared to the national median of 38. Children aged under 15 years made up 16.3% of the population (the national average was 18.2%) and people aged 65 years and over made up 21.8% of the population (the national average was 17.2%).
Ethnic diversity
61.5% of people were born in Australia; the next most common other countries of birth included England 8.5%, New Zealand 2.5%, China (excluding Special Administrative Regions (SARs) and Taiwan) 2.5%, South Africa 1.8%, and the United States of America 1.8%. 80.0% of people only spoke English at home; other languages spoken at home included Mandarin 3.0%, Spanish 1.2%, French 1.1%, Cantonese 1.0%, and Italian 0.8%.
Religion
The most common responses for religion included No Religion 40.1%, Catholic 23.1%, Anglican 17.3%, and Eastern Orthodox 2.2%.
Finances
The median weekly household income was $2,892, compared to the national median of $1,746. Real estate costs were also high; the median mortgage repayments were $3,870 compared to the national median of $1,863. The median rent was $590 per week. Kurt Iveson, a lecturer in the school of geosciences at Sydney University, said in 2020 that the average taxable income for all private households in Mosman was $169,218, compared to the $72,204 taxable average income in Sydney's Census Metropolitan Area.
Housing
66.0% of all occupied dwellings were family households, 31.7% were single person households and 2.3% were group households. The average household size was 2.3 people. 52.0% of occupied private dwellings were flats or apartments, 34.9% were separate houses, and 12.0% were semi-detached.

== Education ==
Schools in Mosman include:

- Mosman High School
- Mosman Public School (established 1880)
- Beauty Point Public School
- Middle Harbour Public School
- Sacred Heart Catholic Primary School
- Blessed Sacrament Catholic Primary School
- Mosman Church of England Preparatory School (Mosman Prep)
- Queenwood School for Girls (four campuses)
- Mosman Community College (MCC)

== Places of worship ==
Places of worship in Mosman include:

- C3 Mosman Church
- Sacred Heart Roman Catholic Church
- Blessed Sacrament Roman Catholic Church
- St Clement's Anglican Church
- St Luke's Anglican Church
- Mosman Uniting Church
- Mosman Baptist Church
- Scots Kirk Presbyterian Church
- Sydney Life Church
- Mosman Malayalam Church

== Sport and recreation ==
Sporting Clubs serving the Mosman community include:

- Mosman Swans Junior AFL Club
- Mosman Football Club
- Mosman Rugby Club
- Mosman Cricket Club
- Mosman Rowing Club
- Mosman Hockey Club

Australian Test cricket captains Allan Border and Ian Craig grew up in Mosman and played for the local club.

== Culture ==
- Bard on the Beach (formerly Shakespeare by the Sea) is a summer outdoor event that is held at Balmoral Beach.
- The Mosman Art Prize is held annually.
- Nancy Phelan's memoir—A Kingdom by the Sea (1969)—vividly recalls Mosman c. 1920.

== Notable residents ==
- Tom Roberts (1856–1931), painter
- Arthur Streeton (1867–1943), painter
- Margaret Preston (1875–1963), painter and printmaker
- Mirrie Hill (née Solomon) OBE (1889–1986), composer
- Varney Monk (1892–1967), pianist and composer
- Pat Morton (1910–1999), former representative of the Electoral district of Mosman and Leader of the Opposition (NSW)
- Marcel Weyland (1927–2025), translator
- Marie Bashir AD RVO FTSE (1930–2026), former Governor of New South Wales and Chancellor at the University of Sydney
- Barry O'Keefe AM QC (1933–2014), former justice of the Supreme Court of New South Wales and mayor of Mosman
- John Eales (born 1970), former Rugby Union player
- Rob Hirst (1955–2026), musician
- Matt Shirvington (born 1978), Television Presenter, former athlete
- Sienna Green (born 2004), water polo Olympian
