= Monterey, Mosman =

Monterey
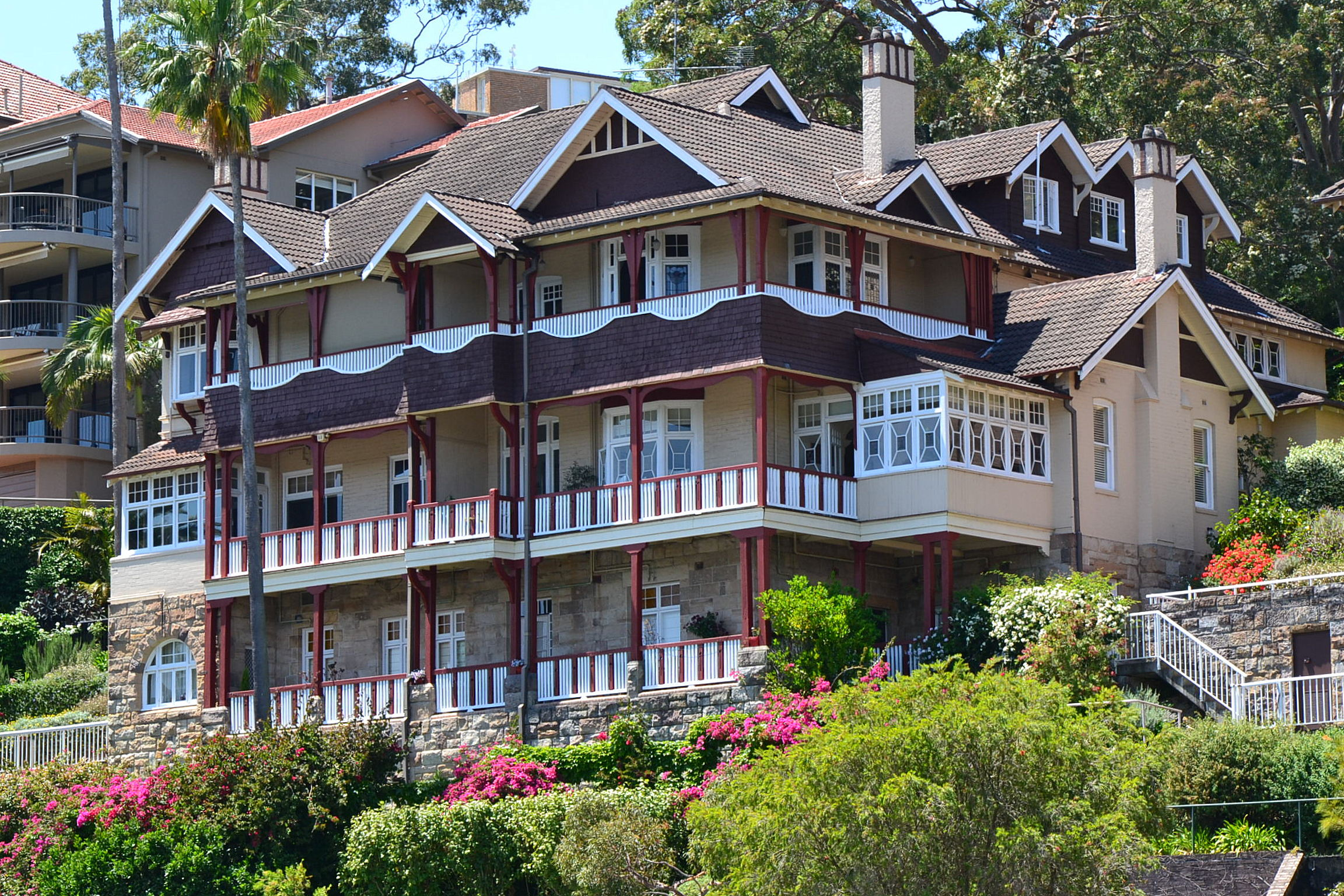
- Monterey, pictured in October 2012

- Location within Sydney Location within Australia
- 33°50′17″S 151°14′01″E
- Location: 1 Avenue Road, Mosman, Municipality of Mosman, New South Wales, Australia

History
- Built: 1900–1901

Site notes
- Architectural style: Federation Queen Anne

New South Wales Heritage Register
- Official name: Monterey; Monterey, residential apartments; Residential apartments
- Type: State heritage (built)
- Designated: 2 April 1999
- Reference no.: 367
- Type: Historic site

Monterey is a heritage-listed residential apartments located at 1 Avenue Road, Mosman in the Mosman Council local government area of New South Wales, Australia. It was built from 1900 to 1901. It is also known as Monterey residential apartments. It was added to the New South Wales State Heritage Register on 2 April 1999.

== History ==
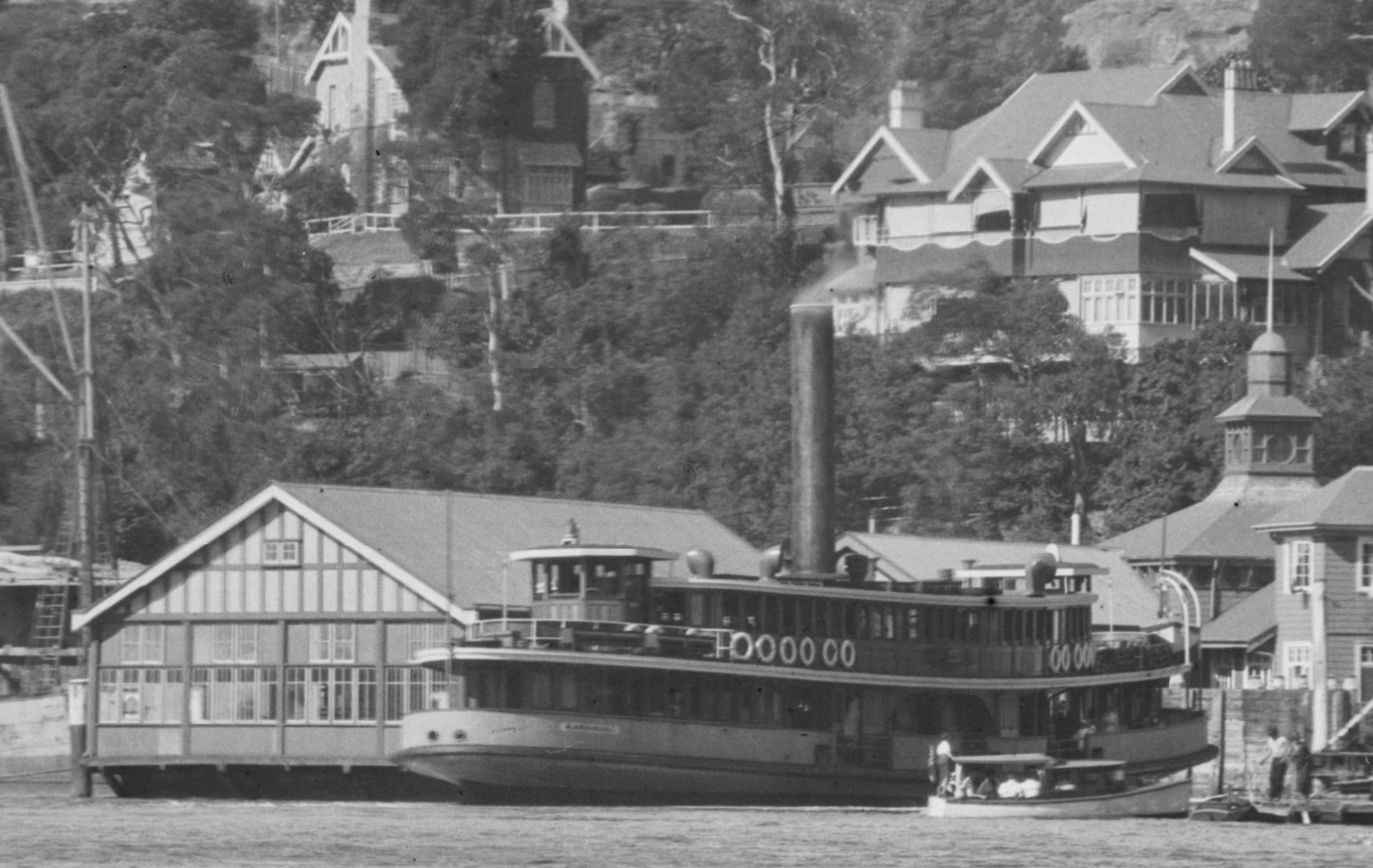
Monterey (top right) in 1917 with ferry Kanangra at Mosman Bay wharf

Though it is now a block of apartments, Monterey was erected about 1900-1901 as a grand residence for a local surgeon. It was purchased in a derelict state by Mr W. Baker, who restored the building for use as a restaurant and private hotel. In more recent times it has been returned to a residential function.

== Description ==
=== Siting and setting ===
Monterey is a prominent Mosman landmark. Its scale, verticality, style and hillside setting amidst mature palms make a substantial contribution to the character of Mosman Bay. Prominently located on the headland directly above Mosman Wharf, Monterey is an impressive three-storeyed element in the townscape, and probably Sydney's most dramatic example of this stylistic mode.

=== Building ===
Its variegated yet harmonious architectural treatment is characteristic of the Federation Queen Anne style, but here the large size of the building and overtones of the American Shingle style add importance.

Federation Queen Anne, with American Shingle style apartment block. The ground floor is faced with sandstone and the two upper storeys are face brick. The building displays many characteristics of the Federation Queen Anne style: a complex asymmetrical hip-and-gable tiled roof, with shingled gables and leadlight glazing.

The three-storeyed verandah ensemble has bays supported on single and paired posts, the lower two storeys with open balusters and the top level with flared shingled aprons topped by baluster-work.

The fenestration comprises bracketed oriels, facetted bays and ranges of multi-paned casements. The wall-hung shingling imparts to the design an American Shingle-style flavour. The terraced garden includes a couple of very tall, shaft-like Washingtonia palms. Several Washingtonias and a Livistona in the neighbouring grounds enframe the house. Below the garden the streetfront sandstone retaining wall has been penetrated by seven arched garage entrances.

=== Condition ===
As at 27 October 2016, the whole complex appears to be in excellent condition.

== Heritage listing ==
Monterey, residential apartments was listed on the New South Wales State Heritage Register on 2 April 1999.

== See also ==
- Australian residential architectural styles
