= Mosman Council =

- Local government area
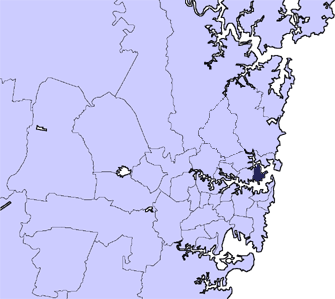
- Location in metropolitan Sydney

- Interactive map of Mosman Council
- Coordinates: 33°50′S 151°15′E
- Country: Australia
- State: New South Wales
- Region: North Shore
- Established: 11 April 1893 (as Borough of Mosman)
- Council seat: Mosman

Government
  - Mayor: Ann Marie Kimber
  - State electorate: North Shore
  - Federal division: Warringah

Area
  - Total: 9 km^{2} (3.5 sq mi)

Population
  - Total: 28,329 (2021 census)
  - Density: 3,150/km^{2} (8,200/sq mi)
- Website: Mosman Council
LGAs around Mosman Council
Willoughby	Middle Harbour	Northern Beaches
North Sydney	Mosman Council	Sydney Heads
Sydney	Sydney Harbour	Woollahra

Mosman Council is a local government area on the Lower North Shore of Sydney, New South Wales, Australia.

The mayor of Mosman Council is Ann Marie Kimber, a representative of the Serving Mosman independent political group.

== Suburbs and localities in the local government area ==
- Mosman

In February 1997, the Government gazetted that they had assigned the suburb of Mosman as the only suburb in the Municipality of Mosman. However, Mosman Council decided that residents should continue to be allowed to use the traditional locality names if they wished.

The municipality also includes, manages and maintains the following localities and locations:

- Athol Bay
- Balmoral
- Balmoral Beach
- Beauty Point
- Bradleys Head
- Chinamans Beach
- Chowder Bay
- Chowder Head
- Clifton Gardens
- Cobblers Beach
- Edwards Beach
- Georges Head
- Georges Heights
- Hunters Bay
- Little Sirius Cove
- Long Bay
- Middle Head
- Mosman Bay
- Obelisk Bay
- Parriwi Head
- Pearl Bay
- Quakers Hat Bay
- Rocky Point
- Shell Cove
- Spit Junction
- Taylors Bay
- Taronga Zoo
- The Spit
- Wyargine Point

== Demographics ==
At the 2021 census, there were 28,329 people in the Mosman local government area, of these 46.0 per cent were male and 54.0 per cent were female. Aboriginal and Torres Strait Islander people made up 0.3 per cent of the population, significantly below the NSW and Australian averages of 3.4 and 3.2 per cent respectively. The median age of people in the Mosman Council area was 45 years, significantly above the national average of 38 years. Children aged 0 – 14 years made up 16.3 per cent of the population and people aged 65 years and over made up 21.8 per cent of the population. Of people in the area aged 15 years and over, 50.2 per cent were married and 11.3 per cent were either divorced or separated.

Population growth in the Mosman local government area between the 2001 census and the 2006 census was 2.99 per cent: in the subsequent five years to the 2011 census, population growth was 4.64 per cent. At the 2016 census, the population in the Mosman Council area increased by 3.72 per cent. This was lower than the national average rate of total population growth of Australia for the same period, which was 8.8 per cent. The median weekly income for residents within the Mosman Council area in 2021 was nearly double the national average at $2,892 compared to $1,746 nationally.

About 23.1 per cent of residents in the Mosman Council area nominated an affiliation with Catholicism at the 2021 census, compared with the national average of 20.0 per cent. The proportion of residents with no religion was slightly higher than the national average at 40.1% compared to 38.4% nationally. Compared to the national average, at the 2016 census, households in the Mosman local government area had a low proportion (18.6 per cent) where two or more languages are spoken (national average was 22.2 per cent); and a high proportion (77.9 per cent) where English only was spoken at home (national average was 72.7 per cent).

Selected historical census data for Mosman local government area
Census year		2001	2006	2011	2016	2021
Population	Estimated residents on census night	25,475	▲26,236	▲27,453	▲28,475	▼28,329
Population	LGA rank in terms of size within New South Wales		70th	▲63rd	▲62nd	
Population	% of New South Wales population		0.42%	▼0.40%	▼0.38%	
Population	% of Australian population	0.14%	▼0.13%	0.13%	▼0.12%	
Population	Estimated ATSI population on census night	21	▲26	▲31	▲60	▲82
Population	% of ATSI population to residents	0.1%	0.1%	0.1%	▲0.2%	▲0.3%
Cultural and language diversity						
Ancestry, top responses	English			39.5%	▲40.1%	▲41.0%
Ancestry, top responses	Australian			28.1%	▼25.8%	▲26.8%
Ancestry, top responses	Irish			13.4%	▲14.8%	▼14.3%
Ancestry, top responses	Scottish			11.3%	▲11.8%	▲12.4%
Ancestry, top responses	Chinese				5.1%	▲6.2%
Language, top responses (other than English)	Mandarin	n/c	n/c	0.8%	▲2.2%	▲3.0%
Language, top responses (other than English)	Spanish	n/c	n/c	n/c	1.2%	1.2%
Language, top responses (other than English)	French	0.7%	0.7%	▲1.0%	▲1.1%	1.1%
Language, top responses (other than English)	Cantonese	1.0%	▼0.9%	▼0.8%	▲0.9%	▲1.0%
Language, top responses (other than English)	Italian	0.8%	0.8%	▲1.0%	▼0.9%	▼0.8%
Religious affiliation						
Religious affiliation, top responses	No religion, so described	17.1%	▲19.2%	▲23.5%	▲31.3%	▲40.1%
Religious affiliation, top responses	Catholic	25.3%	25.3%	▲25.6%	▼23.9%	▼23.1%
Religious affiliation, top responses	Anglican	29.6%	▼27.5%	▼24.6%	▼20.1%	▼17.3%
Religious affiliation, top responses	Not stated	n/c	n/c	n/c	10.6%	▼5.0%
Religious affiliation, top responses	Presbyterian and Reformed	4.4%	▼3.8%	▼3.2%	▼2.6%	
Median weekly incomes						
Personal income	Median weekly personal income		$969	▲$1,117	▲$1,295	▲$1,487
Personal income	% of Australian median income		207.9%	▼193.6%	▲195.6%	
Family income	Median weekly family income		A$1,916	▲$2,838	▲$3,671	▲$4,502
Family income	% of Australian median income		186.6%	▲191.6%	▲211.7%	
Household income	Median weekly household income		$2,675	▼$2,465	▲$2,522	▲$2,892
Household income	% of Australian median income		228.4%	▼199.8%	▼175.4%	
Dwelling structure						
Dwelling type	Separate house	36.9%	▲38.5%	▲38.9%	▼35.4%	▼34.9%
Dwelling type	Semi-detached, terrace or townhouse	12.5%	▼11.2%	▲12.5%	▼12.1%	▼12.0%
Dwelling type	Flat or apartment	48.6%	▲49.4%	▼48.0%	▲51.7%	▲52.0%

== Council ==
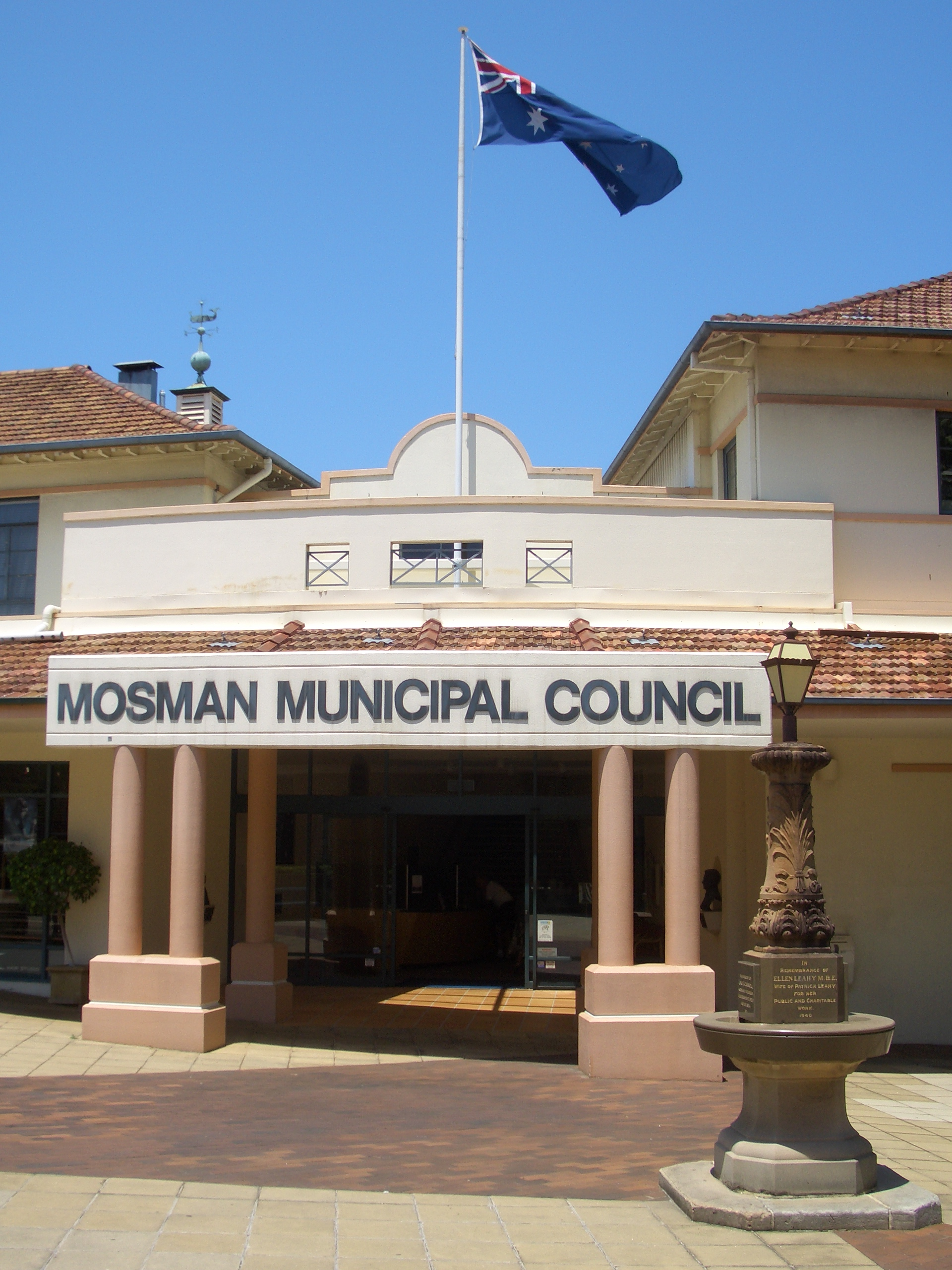
Mosman Municipal Council Chambers

Mayor		Term	Notes
Mayor	Ann Marie Kimber	14 September 2024 – present	
Deputy Mayor	Michael Randall	8 October 2024 – present	
General manager		Term	Notes
Craig Covich		2 September 2025 – present	

=== Composition and election methods ===
Term	Aldermen/Councillors	Wards	Mayor
1893–1895	9	No wards	Annual election by Aldermen/Councillors
1895–1902	9 (3 per ward)	West Ward; East Ward; North Ward	Annual election by Aldermen/Councillors
1902–1948	12 (3 per ward)	Balmoral Ward; West Ward; East Ward; North Ward	Annual election by Aldermen/Councillors
1948–2008	12 (3 per ward)	Middle Harbour Ward; Balmoral Ward; East Ward; West Ward	Annual election by Aldermen/Councillors
2008–2012	9 (3 per ward)	Middle Harbour Ward; Balmoral Ward; Mosman Bay Ward	Annual election by Aldermen/Councillors
2012–present	7 (6 Councillors, 1 Mayor)	No wards	Direct quadrennial election

=== Current composition and election method ===
Mosman Council comprises seven councillors, including the mayor, for a fixed four-year term of office. The mayor has been directly elected since 2012 while the six other councillors are elected proportionally as one ward. The deputy mayor is elected annually by the councillors. From the 2008 elections to the 2012 elections, the area was divided into three wards (Mosman Bay, Middle Harbour, Balmoral), each electing three councillors and the mayor was elected by the councillors annually. The most recent election was held on 14 September 2024, and the makeup of the council, including the mayor, is as follows:

Party	Councillors
Serving Mosman	4
Independents	1
Mosman Better/Independent Liberal	1
Greens	1
Total	7

The current Council, elected in 2024, in order of election, is:

Mayor	Party	Notes
Ann Marie Kimber	Serving Mosman	Mayor 2024–present.
Councillor	Party	Notes
Carolyn Corrigan	Serving Mosman	Deputy Mayor 2015–2016; Mayor 2017–2024.
Simon Menzies	Independent	Elected 2004 (West Ward 2004–08, Mosman Bay Ward 2008–12); Deputy Mayor 2009–2011, May–Sep 2012, Jan–Sep 2022.
Roy Bendall	Independent Liberal	Elected 2012; Deputy Mayor 2012–2015, 2016–2018, 2022–2023.
Michael Randall	Serving Mosman	Deputy Mayor 2024–present
Phillipa (Pip) Friedrich	Serving Mosman	Deputy Mayor 2023–2024
Colleen Godsell AM	Greens	

== Election results ==
=== 2024 ===
2024 New South Wales local elections: Mosman
Party	Candidate	Votes	%	±%
Serving Mosman	1. Ann Kimber; 2. Carolyn Corrigan (elected 1); 3. Michael Randall (elected 4); 4. Pip Friedrich (elected 5); 5. Harley Van Der Pluijm	7,062	43.1	+0.7
Independent	1. Simon Menzies (elected 2); 2. Libby Moline; 3. Kata Kiss	3,595	21.9	+1.5
Mosman Better	1. Roy Bendall (elected 3); 2. Jacqui Willoughby; 3. Alessandro Marturano; 4. Miranda Barclay; 5. Kim Blackburne	3,102	18.9	+0.7
Greens	1. Colleen Godsell (elected 6); 2. Oliver Godsell; 3. Ruth Marshall	1,659	10.1	+10.1
Labor	1. John Wakefield; 2. Alyson Wills; 3. Warren Yates	971	5.9	+5.9
Total formal votes		16,389	95.3	
Informal votes		807	4.7	
Turnout		17,196	81.4	

== History ==
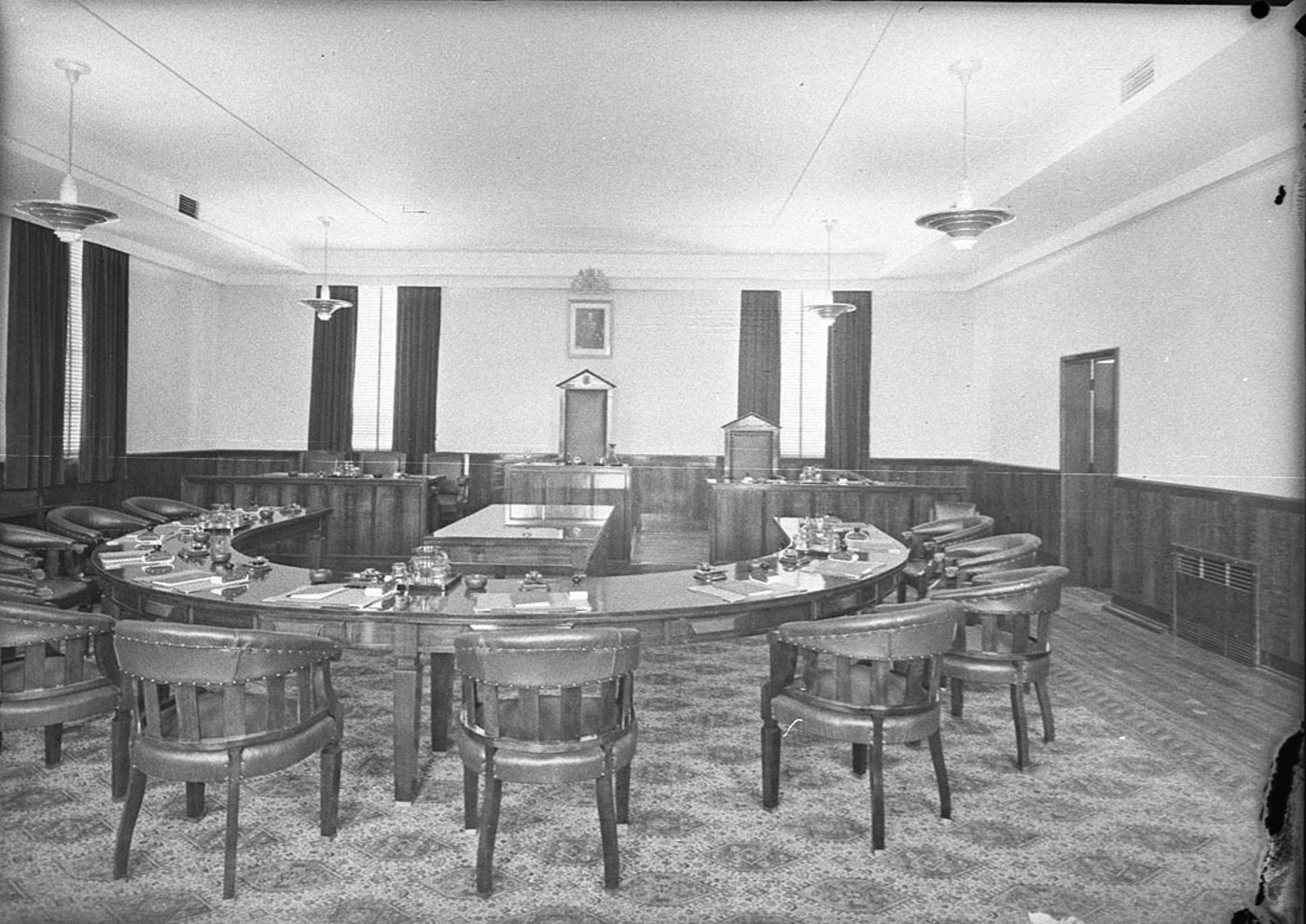
Mosman Council Chambers in February 1940 by Sam Hood.

Mosman was first incorporated in 1867 as the "Mossmans Ward" of the Municipality of St Leonards, which lasted until 1890 when the boroughs of Victoria, St Leonards and East St Leonards merged to form the Borough of North Sydney, with the Mosman ward renamed as the "Mossman Ward". Following a petition submitted by residents in 1892, on 11 April 1893 the ward's separation as the Borough of Mosman was proclaimed by Lieutenant-Governor Sir Frederick Darley. The first nine-member council was elected on 9 June 1893, with the first mayor, Richard Hayes Harnett Jr., elected on the same day. From 28 December 1906, following the passing of the Local Government Act, 1906, the council was renamed as the "Municipality of Mosman". With the passing of the Local Government Act, 1993, the Municipality of Mosman was legally renamed as Mosman Council and aldermen were renamed councillors.

A 2015 review of local government boundaries by the NSW Government Independent Pricing and Regulatory Tribunal recommended that the Municipality of Mosman merge with adjoining councils. The government considered two proposals. The first proposed a merger of Manly and Mosman Councils and parts of Warringah Council to form a new council with an area of 49 square kilometres (19 sq mi) and support a population of approximately 153,000. The alternative, proposed by Warringah Council on 23 February 2016, was for an amalgamation of the Pittwater, Manly and Warringah councils. As a consequence of Warringah's proposal, the New South Wales Minister for Local Government Paul Toole proposed that the North Sydney, Willoughby and Mosman Councils be merged. In July 2017, the Berejiklian government decided to abandon the forced merger of the North Sydney, Willoughby and Mosman local government areas, along with several other proposed forced mergers.

== Heritage listings ==
Mosman Council has a number of heritage-listed sites, including:

- Balmoral, The Esplanade: Balmoral Bathers Pavilion
- Georges Head, Chowder Bay Road: Georges Head Fortifications
- Middle Head, Middle Head Road: Middle Head Fortifications
- Mosman, Avenue Road: Mosman Bay Sewage Aqueduct
- Mosman, 1 Avenue Road: Monterey
- Mosman, 3a Avenue Road: The Barn, Scout Hall
- Mosman, 114 Belmont Road: Alma House
- Mosman, Bradleys Head Road (within Sydney Harbour NP): Bradleys Head Fortification Complex
- Mosman, 34 Bullecourt Avenue: Woolley House
- Mosman, 42 Cowles Road: 42 Cowles Road, Mosman
- Mosman, 624-632 Military Road: Boronia House
- Mosman, 28 Mistral Avenue: 28 Mistral Avenue, Mosman
- Mosman, 65 Parriwi Road: Igloo House
- Port Jackson, Bradleys Head: Bradleys Head Light

== Sister city ==
Mosman has twin town status with Glen Innes.

== See also ==
- Local government areas of New South Wales
