= Boronia House, Mosman =

Former residence in NSWSH, Australia

Boronia House
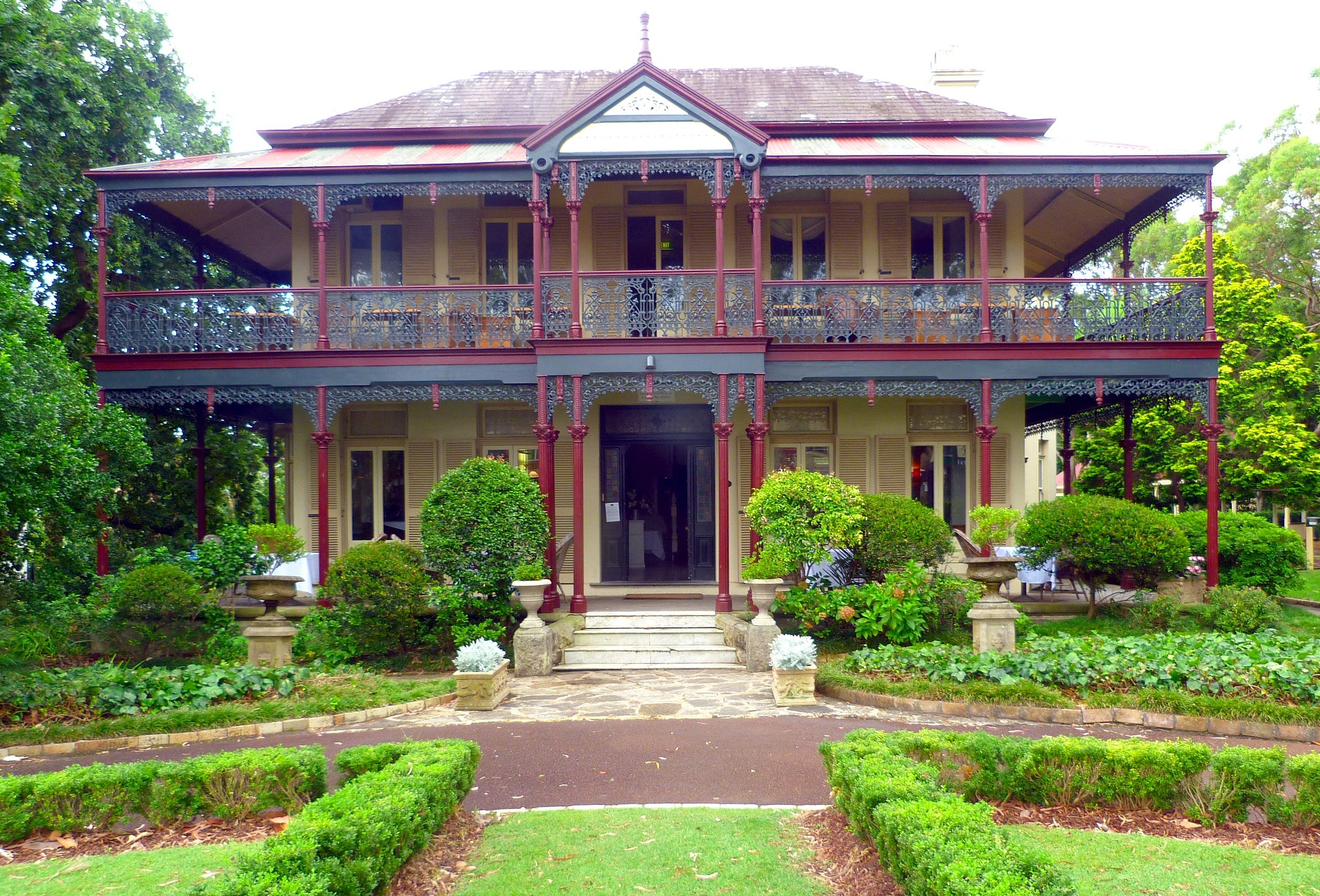
- Boronia House

- Location within east Sydney
- 33°49′27″S 151°14′21″E
- Location: 624–632 Military Road, Mosman, Municipality of Mosman, New South Wales, Australia

History
- Built: 1885
- Built for: James and John Kearey

Site notes
- Architects: Sheerin & Hennessy (1885); Clive Lucas & Partners (1985 restoration)
- Architectural style: Victorian Filigree
- Owner: Mosman Council

New South Wales Heritage Register
- Official name: Boronia House; Boronia
- Type: State heritage (complex / group)
- Designated: 2 April 1999
- Reference no.: 69
- Type: Villa
- Category: Residential buildings (private)

Boronia House is a heritage-listed former residence located at 624–632 Military Road, Mosman, New South Wales, a suburb of Sydney, Australia. It was designed by Sheerin & Hennessy (1885) and Clive Lucas & Partners (1985 restoration), and built during 1885. The property is owned by Mosman Council. The property is also called Boronia. It was added to the New South Wales State Heritage Register on 2 April 1999.

== History ==
Boronia is one of two almost identical neighbouring freestanding houses built in 1885 by two Newtown carriage builders, James and John Kearey, as residences for themselves with a common garden and entrance. The other residence was Telopea, at 89B Cowles Road, which is now altered and built out by later development including a service station. Both houses are attributed to the well-known and prolific Sydney architectural firm of Sheerin & Hennessy.

The 1890s depression hit the Kearey business so badly that all their assets had to be sold including "Boronia".

The house faces south, addressing Military Road, from which it is set well back in an open garden behind a stone fence capped with iron cresting. A substantial two-storey wing was added at the north-east corner, probably in the late 1890s and soon afterwards a glazed bay with Art Nouveau detailing was added to the drawing room in this wing.

The building remained virtually unaltered until it was acquired by Mosman Council in 1952, at which time it was considerably modified for occupation by the Mosman Municipal Library. Between 1978 and 1985 the building was used as offices and further altered. Boronia was used for external establishing shots of the fictional 'Jacaranda House' in the 1964 ABC television drama series "The Purple Jacaranda".| During 1985 Boronia was restored, reconstructed and adapted for use as a restaurant and function centre.

=== James and Ellen Kearey ===
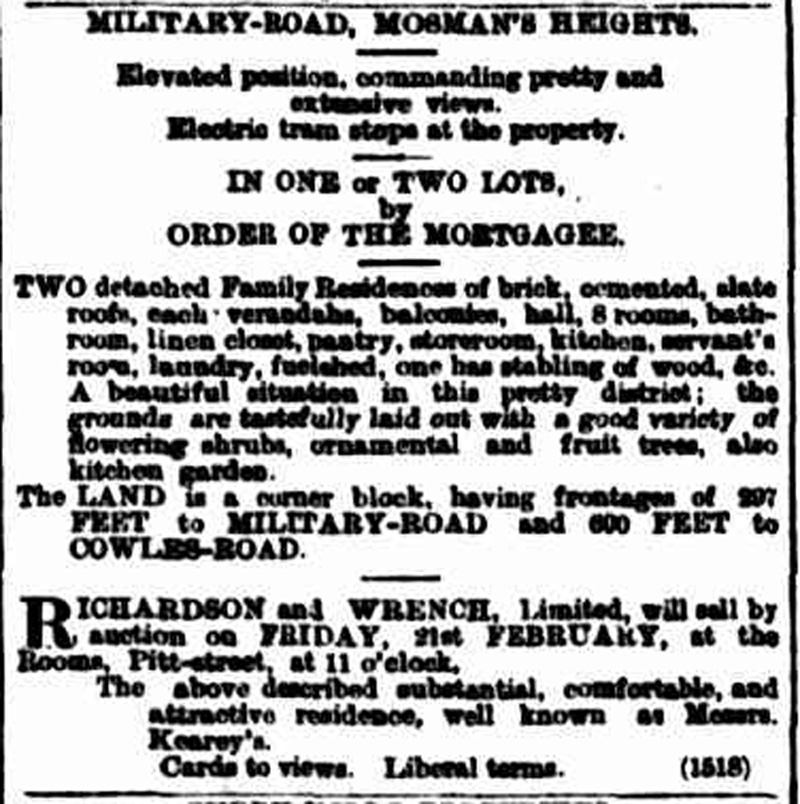
Advertisement for the sale of Boronia and Telopea in 1896.

The brothers James and John Kearey built Boronia in 1885. It was part of an estate which contained two identical houses called Boronia and Telopea and a common garden. James occupied Boronia and John lived in Telopea.

James Kearey was born in 1842 in Sydney. His parents were John and Mary Ann Kearey who had immigrated from Ireland. In about 1840 his father had established a coachbuilding business in Sydney and the firm had become very successful. His mother Mary Ann died in 1849 when he was only seven years old. His father remarried Catherine Fraser in 1851 and James and his elder brother John were brought up by their stepmother.

In 1872 his father died and John seems to have taken over the management of the coachbuilding firm. However, in 1877 the brothers together constructed a building in Pitt Street which featured in an 1878 edition of the Australian Town and Country Journal. The new business was called Kearey Brothers and for the next two decades the firm flourished. The brothers were credited with inventing a new type of carriage which was described in the newspaper The Sydney Mail.

In 1871 James married Honora Murphy and the couple had three children. Honora died in 1879 and soon after James married Ellen Doherty. James and Ellen had eight children, five of whom were born at Mosman.

In 1885 John and James built two adjoining villa houses in Mosman which they called Boronia and Telopea. James and his wife Ellen lived in Boronia and John and his wife Lucy lived in Telopea. The house has been described as it was when the Kearey brothers lived there in the following terms.

"Originally there was a row of large camphor laurels just inside the front fence and round flowerbeds were cut into the lawn to contain various species of plants.

The gardens originally included a vegetable and flower garden, an orchid and shrubberies and fern house. Several gardeners were employed to keep the grounds in order and to tend the grass tennis court".

In 1891 John's wife Lucy died and three years later in 1894 John also died. James and Ellen continued to live at Boronia for two more years. However, in 1896 both houses were put on the market. The advertisement for their sale is shown on the right. Boronia was bought by George Willis Godwin and the Godwin family lived there for the next 50 years.

=== The Godwin Family ===
George Willis Godwin was born in 1856 in England and migrated to Australia at the age of 23 in 1879. In 1896 when he was 40 years old he married Olive Mildred Simpson who was 18 years his junior. He bought Boronia in the same year he was married and he and Olive lived there for the rest of their lives. The couple had three children John Willis Godwin, Ena Godwin and Noell Godwin.

George was a money broker and had a flourishing business in Castlereagh Street in Sydney. After he retired he remained at Boronia and died in 1940 at the age of 84. He left his estate to his son John, but his wife Olive continued to live at Boronia until her death in 1951.

One of the Godwin's granddaughters, daughter of John Willis Godwin, Patricia Judy Godwin, gave an account of her memories of Boronia when she went to visit Olive with her mother. She said:

“When I stayed at Boronia I slept in that very large room at the back which I originally was the billiard room. The ceilings were very high and I suppose I was fairly small but I enjoyed it and there was a door that went off on to the balcony and I could go and play there. On the other side the drawing room went the whole length. It had a big fire place in it and lovely old furniture. Then you went down the hall to the kitchen and there must have been a laundry. There was a little fence and you had to go through this gate to get to the potting shed. The stable area came up much further than where that driveway goes around now and it was all just full of trees and chooks and things."

— Patricia Judy Godwin, account of her memories of Boronia.

After Olive died in 1951 her son John sold Boronia in the following year to Mosman Council. The Council still owns the house. Since 1952 they have used the premises as a library, an office and a restaurant.

== Description ==
=== Property/Garden ===
The house is set in a formal Victorian garden setting, with a circular carriage drive or loop immediately south of the main front door, large lawn areas and trees and shrubs set off to both sides and the rear. Large old tree specimens of evergreen magnolia (M.grandiflora), camphor laurel (Cinnamomum camphora) flank it to the southeast, and a pair of symmetrically placed lemon scented gums (Corymbia maculata) frame the house's front gates to Military Road.

=== House ===
The house is completed in the Victorian Filigree style. Boronia is a two storeyed brick house with walls stuccoed and lined externally to simulate ashlar. Its main roof is hipped and slated and the verandah roof is corrugated metal painted in wide stripes. The double storey verandah is an ensemble of cast iron columns, friezes, brackets and balustrades, emphasised at the centre by a gable. The iron balustrading pattern was registered as NSW design No. 90 in 1881 by Fletcher, Bennett and Frew, Sydney Ironfounders. The front boundary is marked by an unusual assemblage of stone fence, cast iron fencing and gates. Some original elements survive internally.

=== Condition ===
As at 6 September 2006, the building and its setting are in excellent condition.

=== Modifications and dates ===
- 1920s: front stone wall moved back (north) due to road widening works.
- Sympathetic minor alterations.

== Heritage listing ==
As at 8 September 2006, Boronia was an excellent example of a substantial villa in the Victorian Filigree style on a site of ample frontage retaining much of its 19th century formal Victorian garden setting to the road. The handsome symmetry of the house is complemented by the open gardens and the stone and iron palisade front fence. The building and its setting are in excellent condition.

Boronia was listed on the New South Wales State Heritage Register on 2 April 1999 having satisfied the following criteria.

The place possesses uncommon, rare or endangered aspects of the cultural or natural history of New South Wales.

This item is historically rare regionally.

The place is important in demonstrating the principal characteristics of a class of cultural or natural places/environments in New South Wales.

This item is socially representative locally.

== See also ==
- Australian residential architectural styles
