= South Kensington Register Office =

Civil register office

South Kensington Register Office was an office for the registration of births, marriages and deaths located at 28, Marloes Road, Kensington, London. The building housing the register office was part of St Mary Abbots Hospital. Both the hospital and the register office were demolished in 1992. The Kensington Green estate now occupies the site.

== Notable people married there ==
- Alison de Froideville, journalist and Vogue editor, and Alfred Towers Settle, barrister at Middle Temple (1918)
- Tony Hatch, musician and composer, and Jackie Trent, singer-songwriter and actress (1967)
- James Joyce, author, and Nora Barnacle (1933)
- Katherine Mansfield, author, and John Middleton Murry, author (1918)
- Jasper Maskelyne, stage magician, and Evelyne Mary Scotcher (1948)
- David Niven, actor, and Hjördis Paulina Tersmeden, fashion model (1948)
