= Sydney artists' camps =

Artists' communities in late 19th/early 20th centuries

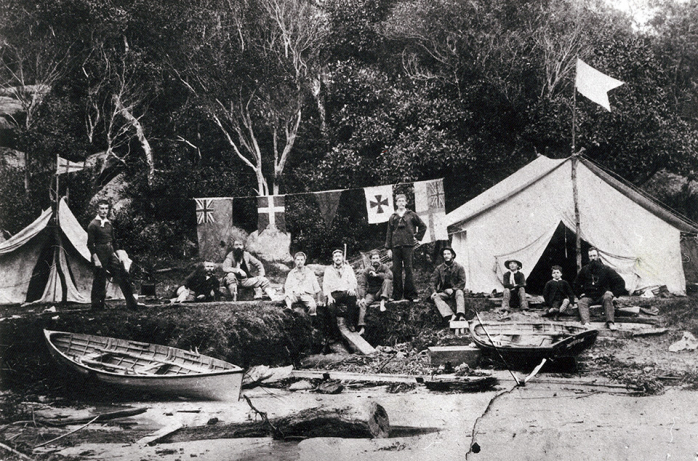
One of the camps, probably "Lotus camp" at Edwards Beach, Balmoral, c. 1890

Artists' camps flourished around Sydney Harbour in the 1880s and 1890s, mainly in the Mosman area making it "Australia's most painted suburb", but died out after the first decade of the twentieth century. They developed as a result of the enthusiasm for painting en plein air fostered by the Barbizon and Impressionist movements in France in the second half of the 19th century, and were modelled on the artists' colonies which grew up in France and parts of the British Isles. In them, free-spirited young men gathered to live cheaply together in the open air, trying to capture the beauty of their surroundings in paintings and drawings. Financial stringency during the depression of the 1890s made life in the camps even more attractive for Australian artists trying to establish themselves in a difficult market.

== Balmoral ==
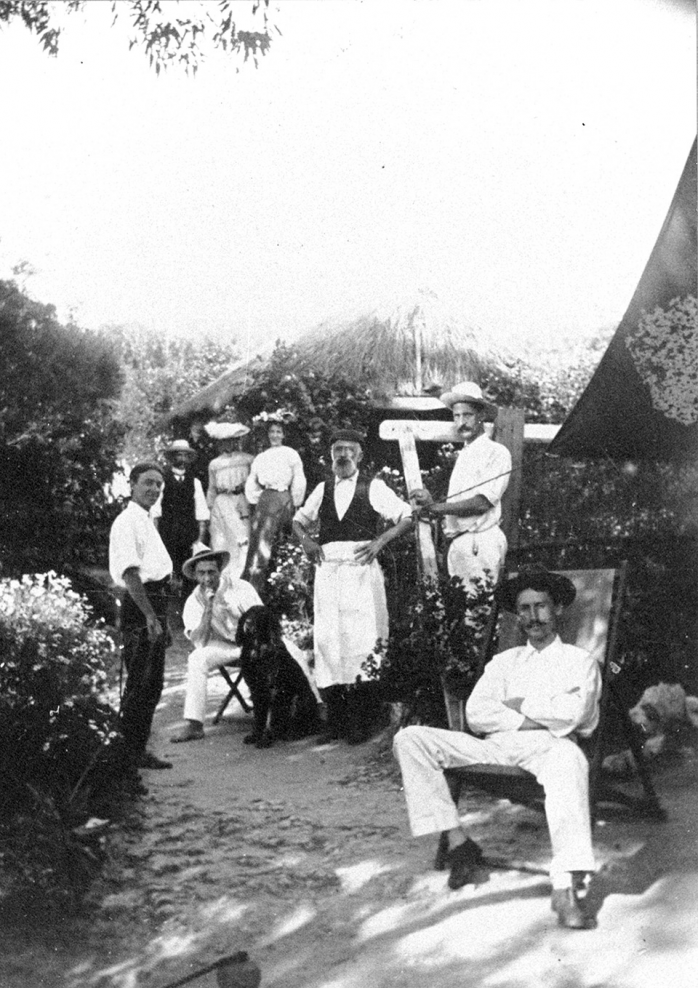
The camp at Balmoral c. 1890. Women were not residents but did visit frequently.

Some of the earliest camps, established before the spread of suburbia, were at Balmoral Beach. One centred on the weekender built by Bulletin cartoonist Livingston Hopkins "Hop" on land he leased near Edwards Beach, in north Balmoral. Among the artists who joined Hop at the camp was Julian Ashton, who, while teaching more formally at his school in the city, also encouraged his students to paint out-of-doors. A.J. Daplyn, another keen promoter of the new style of landscape painting, also stayed at the camp, as did many of the artists working for The Picturesque Atlas of Australasia (1886–89), including Albert Henry Fullwood, Frank P. Mahony, John Mather and Frederic Schell.

According to the custom of the time, women did not live in the camps. They were frequent visitors, however, and many women became enthusiastic landscape painters. Other notable visitors were writers Robert Louis Stevenson, who spent a night at Balmoral under canvas, and Ada Cambridge, who included lyrical descriptions of the camp in her 1891 novel A Marked Man and later, in her Thirty Years in Australia (1903). As she noted:

… a cluster of tents, a little garden, a woodstock, a water tub – almost hidden in the trees and bushes until one was close upon it; and the camp looked out upon the great gateway of the heads, and saw all the ships that passed through, voyaging to the distant world and back again.

== Curlew Camp ==
Equally well known was Curlew Camp, on the eastern shore of Little Sirius Cove, below today's Taronga Zoo. This had been set up by the Oxford Street businessman Reuben Brasch and his family, who came to stay at the camp by boat, crossing the harbour from Parsley Bay.

The Melbourne painters Tom Roberts and Arthur Streeton moved to Sydney in the early 1890s, looking for wider opportunities to sell their work. Both spent considerable periods at Curlew and the paintings they did at this time, of Sydney Harbour, Mosman Bay and nearby Cremorne Point, are among the masterpieces of Australian art.

Curlew was a well established camp, with many home comforts, including a billiards tent. Residents combined to pay a cook, and there was a youth to take care of odd jobs. Arthur Streeton described life there in evocative letters. His friend the composer Marshall Hall, visiting from Melbourne, was inspired by the harbour setting to write his "Hymn to Sydney", which began:

City of laughing loveliness! Sun-girdled Queen!
Crowned with imperial morning, bejewelled with joy...

The art patron Howard Hinton, a frequent visitor, came to know Roberts, Streeton and other painters at the camp. Some of the works he bought from them were donated to the Art Gallery of New South Wales and many became part of the Hinton collection at the Armidale Teachers' College. They can now be seen at the New England Regional Art Museum.

== Bohemians in the Bush ==
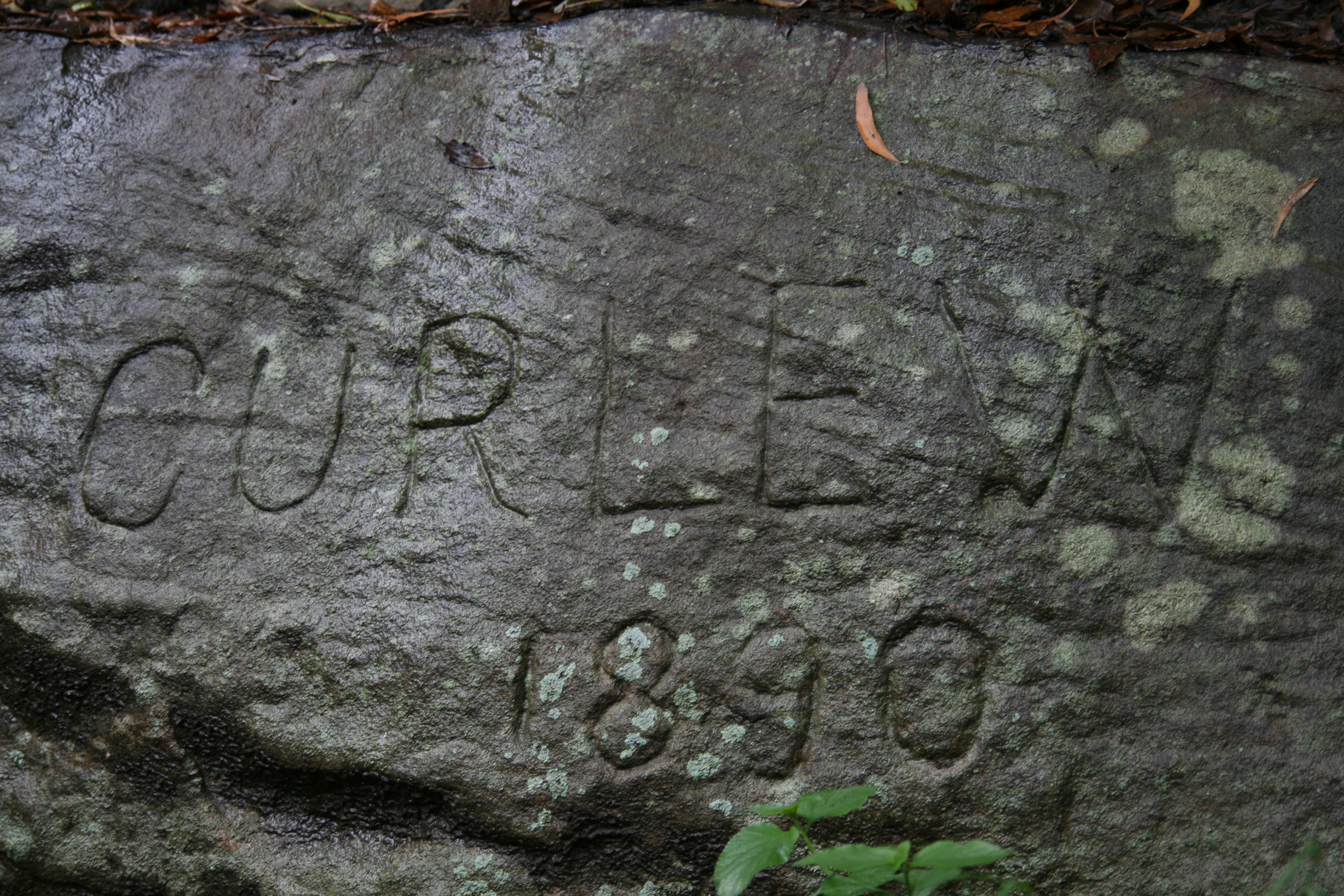
"Curlew 1890", engraved into the rock. Evidence of the camps can still be seen today

In 1991 the Art Gallery of New South Wales presented an exhibition, "Bohemians in the Bush", in celebration of the artists' camps, bringing together an impressive collection of works from the period. The exhibition also aimed to recreate the social context in which the artists lived, and something of the atmosphere of the busy city where many of them earned their livings as teachers and illustrators.

At the time of the "Bohemians in the Bush" exhibition, the site of Curlew Camp was accessible only by water or bush track, and had reverted more or less to its natural condition. In order to ensure the preservation of this area, described as "one of the sacred sites of Australian painting", Mosman Council in 2005 commissioned a heritage study which recommended the creation of a Curlew Camp Artists' Walk, following the route taken from the Mosman ferry. It also recommended improved access to the camp site itself, construction of a viewing platform and interpretative signage. Work began on this project in 2007.

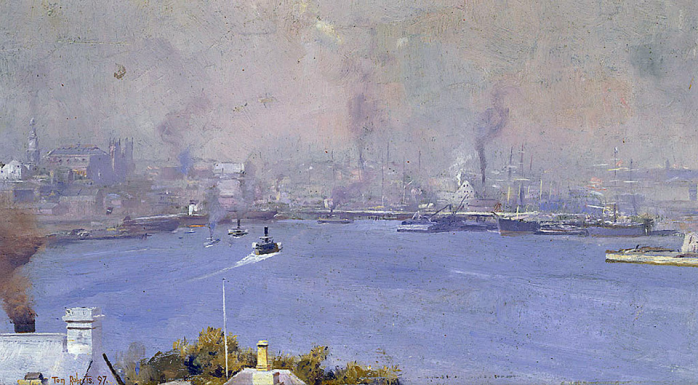
Sydney harbour from Milsons Point by Tom Roberts, 1897

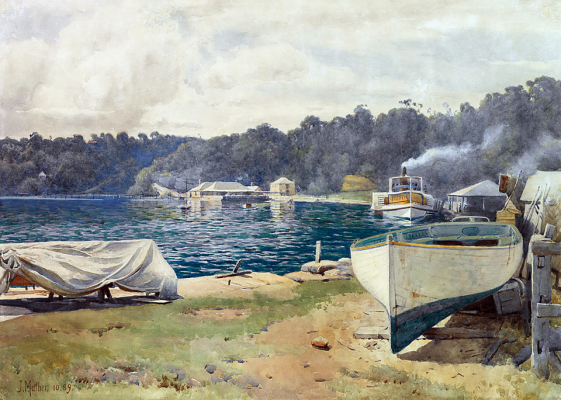
Mosman's Bay by John Mather, 1889

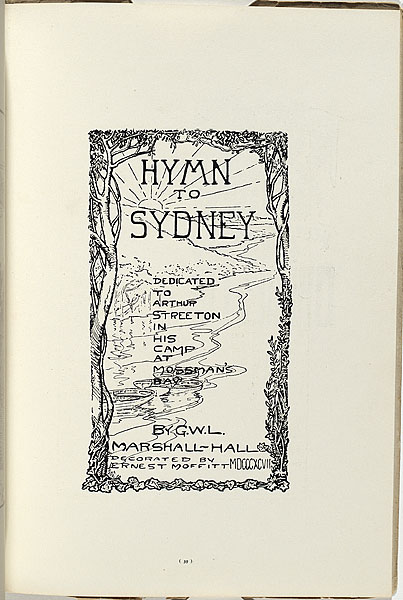
Frontispiece by Ernest Moffitt of Marshall Hall's "Hymn to Sydney", dedicated to Arthur Streeton and the Artists' Camps

== See also ==
- One Summer Again, 1985 docudrama
- Art colony, especially Montsalvat, an artist's colony in Eltham, Victoria, Australia, established by Justus Jörgensen in 1934.

== Bibliography ==
- Julian Ashton, Now Came Still Evening On, Angus and Robertson, Sydney, 1941
- Leigh Astbury, Sunlight and Shadow, Australian Impressionist Painting, 1880–1900, Bay Books, Sydney, 1989 ISBN 1-86256-295-4
- Ada Cambridge, Thirty Years in Australia, Methuen, London, 1903
- AJ Daplyn, Landscape Painting From Nature in Australia, WC Penfold, Sydney, 1902
- Ann Galbally and Anne Gray, Letters From Smike: The Letters of Arthur Streeton 1890–1943, Oxford University Press, Melbourne, 1989 ISBN 0-19-554904-X
- Godden Mackay Logan, "Curlew Camp Artists' Walk: Interpretation Plan and Design Study", Report for Mosman Council, 2006
- C.R. Mansell, Curlew Camp, Lutterworth, London, 1954
- Virginia Spate, Tom Roberts (revised edition), Lansdowne, Melbourne, 1978 ISBN 0-7018-1014-9
