= William Thomas Smedley =

American artist (1858–1920)

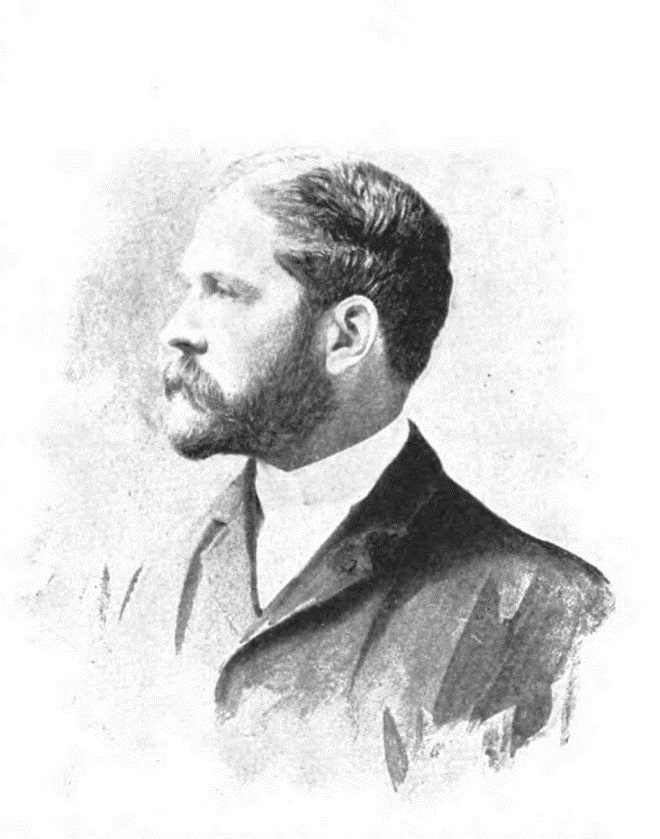
William Thomas Smedley.

William Thomas Smedley (March 26, 1858 – March 26, 1920), was an American artist.

== Biography ==
Smedley was born in Chester County, Pennsylvania, to a Quaker family. He worked at a newspaper, then studied engraving and art at the Pennsylvania Academy of the Fine Arts in Philadelphia, Pennsylvania, made a tour of the South Seas, then studied in Paris under Jean-Paul Laurens. He settled in New York City in 1880. In 1882 he accompanied the Marquis of Lorne through Canada, preparing sketches for Picturesque Canada. He also provided wood engravings that appeared as illustrations in The Picturesque Atlas of Australasia (1886).

Most of Smedley's work consisted of magazine and book illustration for stories about modern life, but he painted portraits and watercolours. He received the Evans Prize of the American Watercolor Society in 1890 and a bronze medal at the Paris Exposition of 1900. In 1905 he became a member of the National Academy of Design.

Smedley died in Bronxville, New York, on March 26, 1920.

== Gallery ==
Selected works

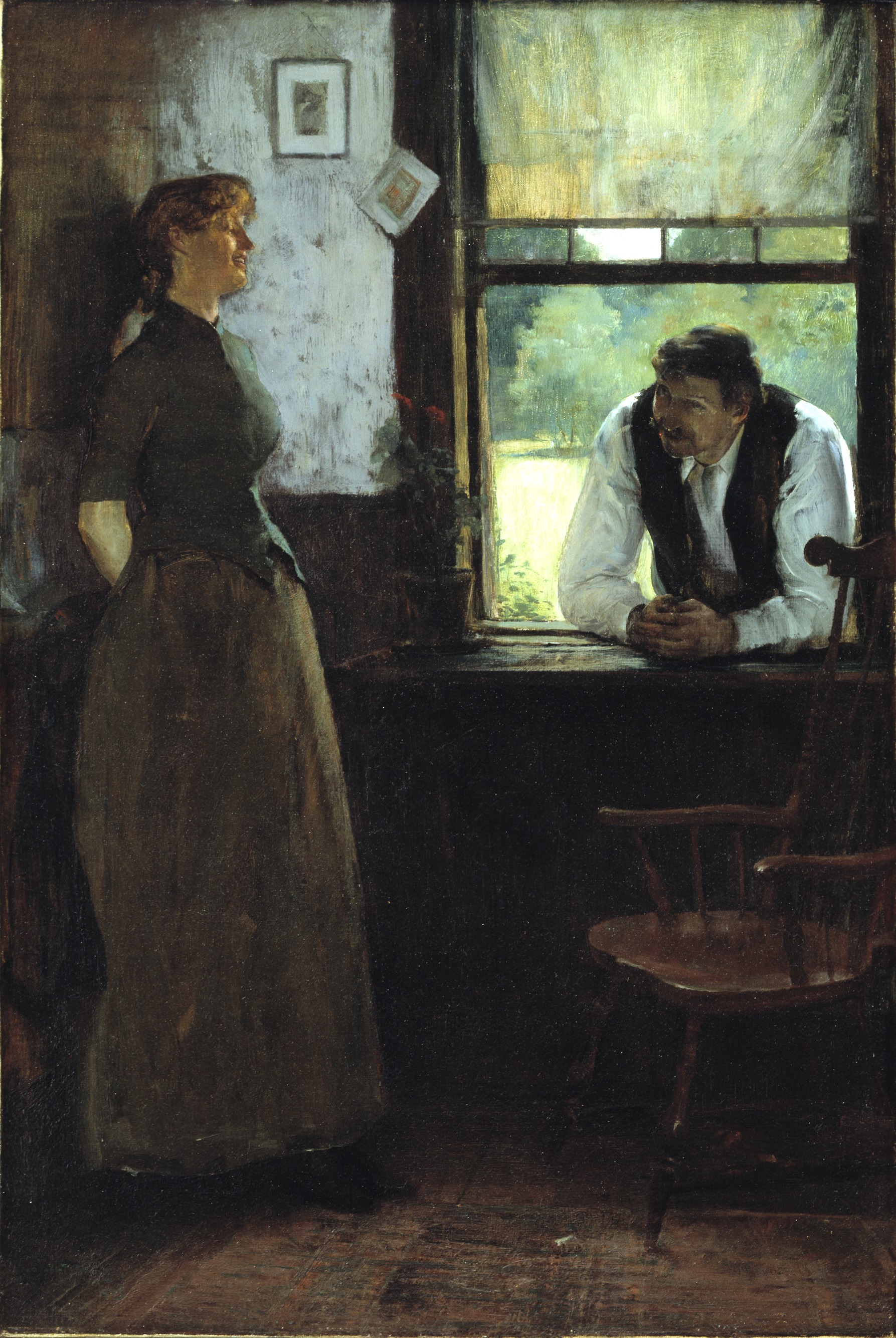
One Day in June (1909)

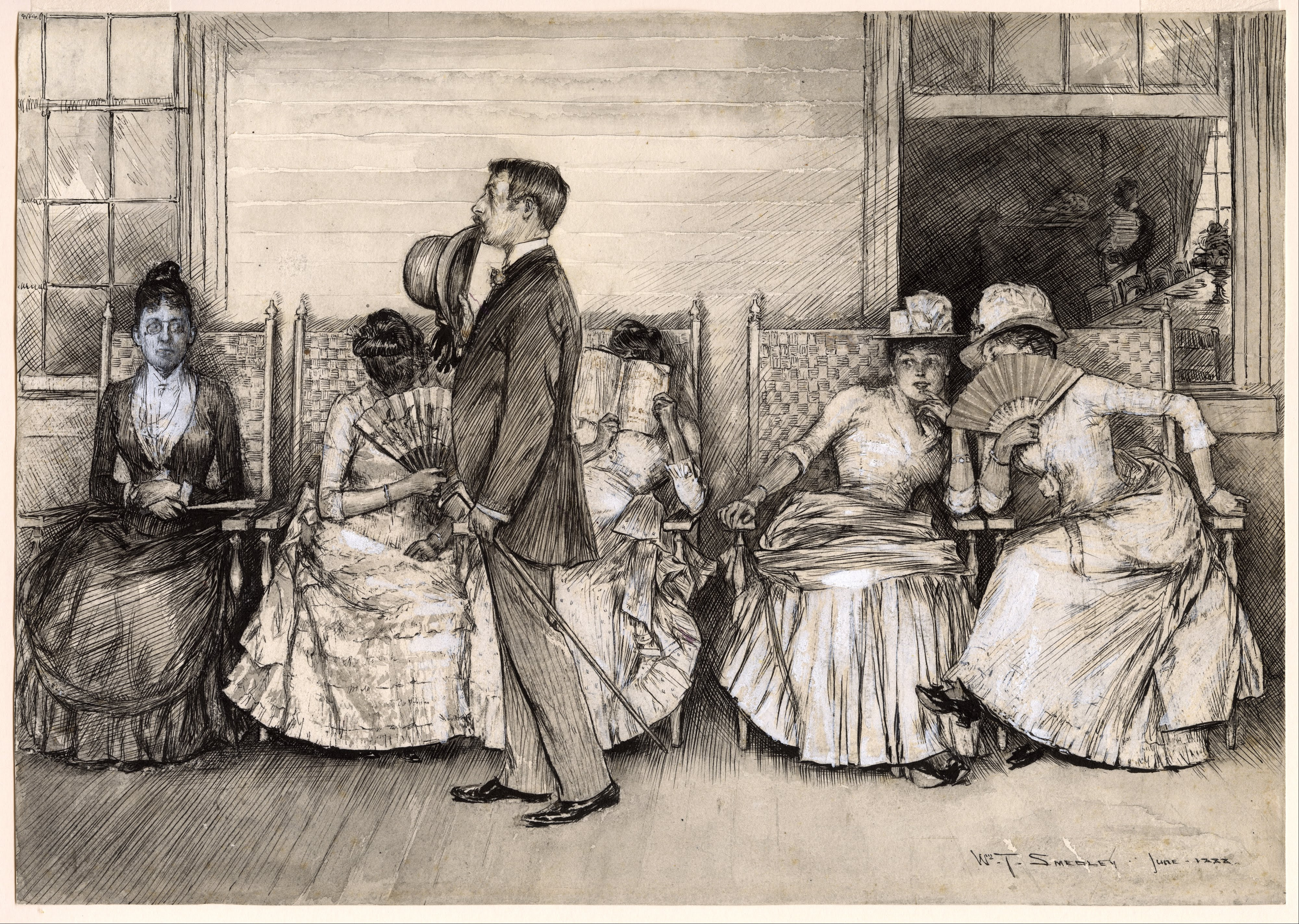
A Late Arrival (1888)

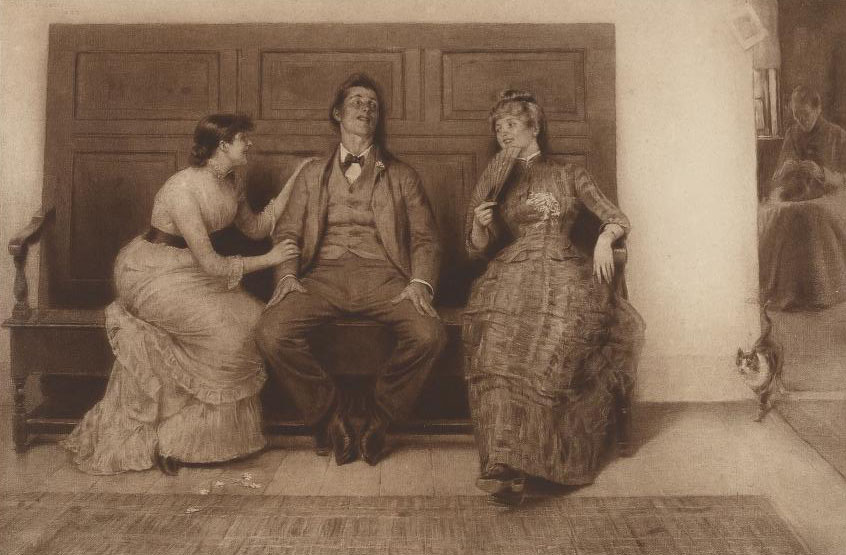
"Between two fires" (1884)

== Works ==
- The Mystery of Francis Bacon (1912)
