= Benwell (surname) =

Benwell is a surname, and may refer to:

- John Hodges Benwell (1764–1785), English genre painter
- Joseph Austin Benwell (1816–1886), English artist, engraver and illustrator
- Mary Benwell (1739–after 1800), English artist
- Thomas Benwell, Master of University College, Oxford
- William Benwell (1765–1796), classical scholar
- Joseph Benwell Clark (1857–1938), English artist
