= Frank P. Mahony =

Australian painter, watercolorist, and illustrator

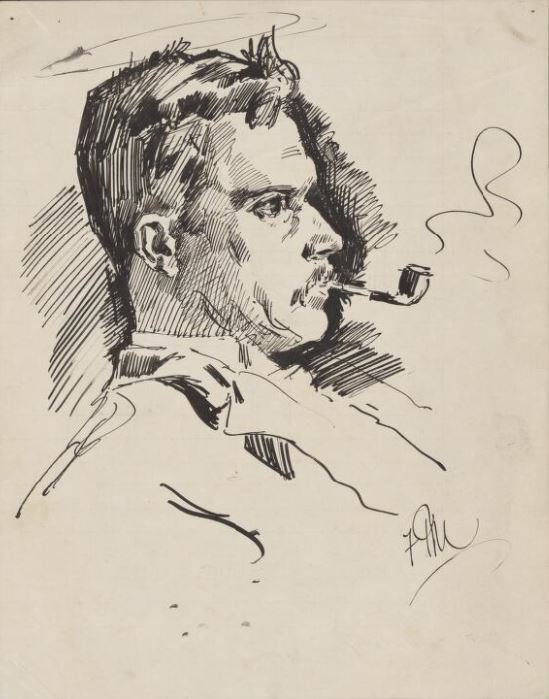
Self-portrait (1900s)

Francis Prout Mahony, also known as Frank Mahony (4 December 1862 – 28 June 1916), was an Australian painter, watercolorist and illustrator. Although christened "Francis Mahony", he later added "Prout" and usually signed his work as "Frank P. Mahony". It is apparently unknown why he chose to add "Prout".

== Biography ==
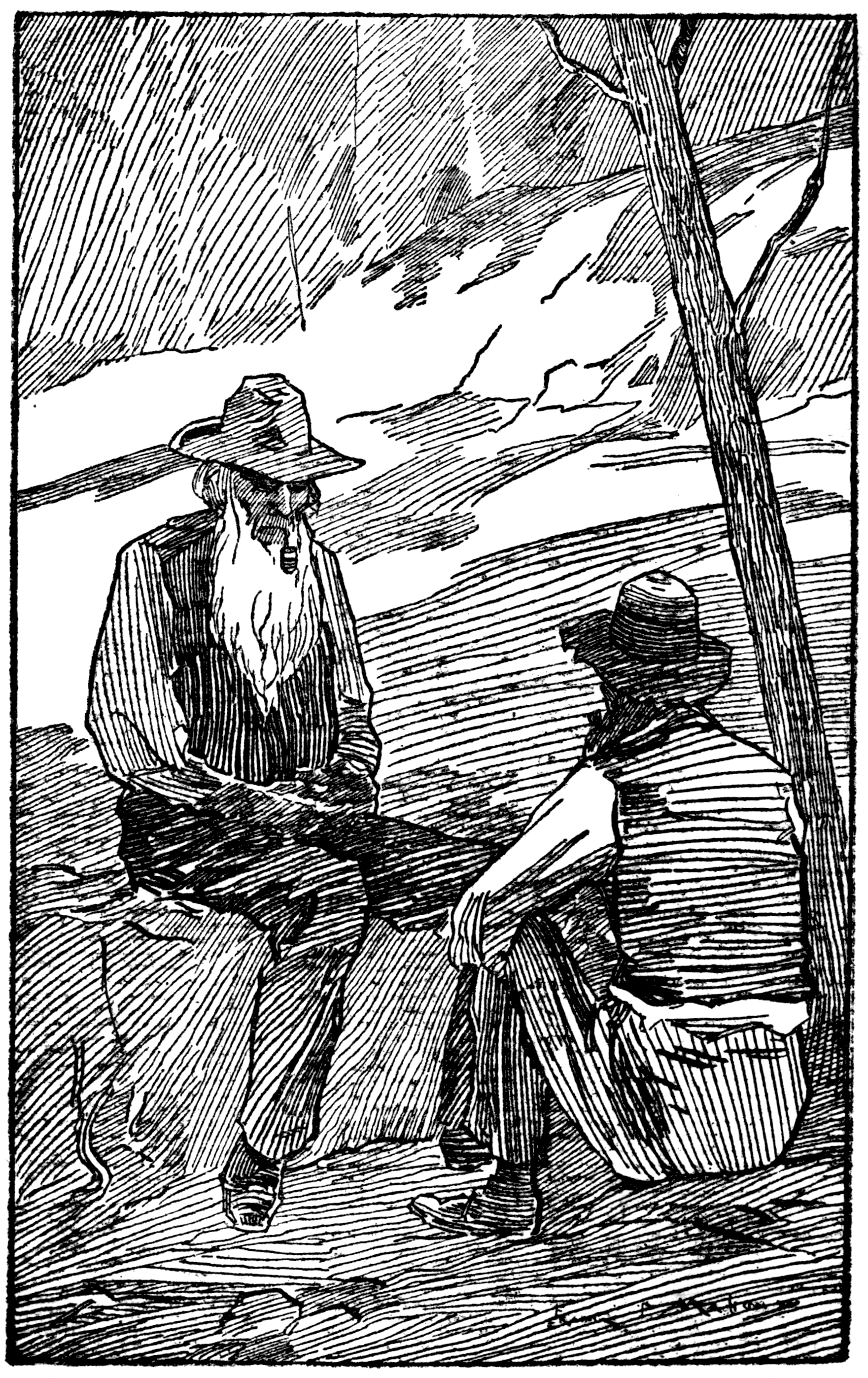
Frontispiece: While the Billy Boils

Mahony was born in Melbourne, third surviving child of Timothy Mahony, an Irish-born contractor, and his Cornish second wife Elizabeth, née Johns. He was taken to Sydney when 10 years old, where he started by working in an architect's office, then studied at the Academy of Art under Giulio Anivitti. His work as an artist began with his employment for The Picturesque Atlas of Australasia (1886), by Andrew Garran.

Mahony's work was accepted by The Bulletin and he became known for his excellent drawings of horses. He also worked for The Antipodean, The Sydney Mail and the Australian Town and Country Journal. In addition to his periodical work, he illustrated numerous books, including Where the Dead Men Lie, and Other Poems by Barcroft Boake, While the Billy Boils by Henry Lawson and Dot and the Kangaroo, a children's book by Ethel Pedley.

His oils were moderately successful. In 1889 his oil painting Rounding up a Straggler, was bought for the Art Gallery of New South Wales. In 1895, he helped create the Society of Artists, Sydney and taught at the Art Society of New South Wales. As his reputation grew, he was initiated as one of the first members of the Dawn and Dusk Club, an erstwhile literary society that was mostly a social club. In 1897, he married a barmaid from Yass named Mary Tobin.

Mahony and Mary moved to England in 1901, but his career largely came to a halt. Despite efforts at self-promotion, he received very few commissions. His health deteriorated and he died of cancer in Kensington Infirmary, London on 28 June 1916. He is best remembered as a capable painter of animals and is represented in the Sydney, Hobart and Wanganui, New Zealand galleries.

The political cartoonist Francis William 'Will' Mahony (1905–1982) was a son. He was born in England but had a career in Sydney, notably with the Daily Telegraph, until November 1944 when he was dismissed for refusing to draw a panel antagonistic to the striking miners. He later drew a strip cartoon for the Melbourne Argus.

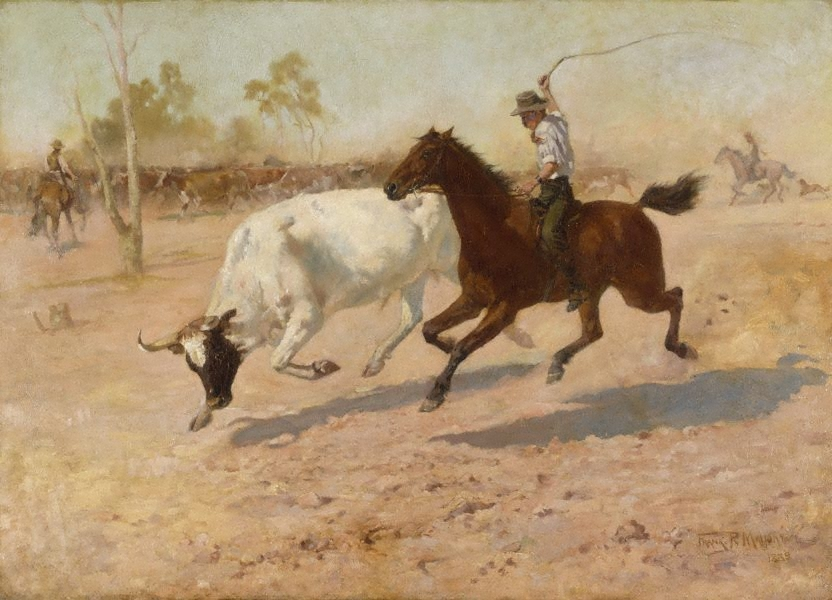
Rounding Up a Straggler (1889)
