= Frank Chesterton =

Frank Chesterton may refer to:

- Frank Chesterton (badminton)
- Frank Chesterton (architect)
