= Harriet Alsop =

British nurse (1867–1950)

Harriet Alsop MBE, SRN
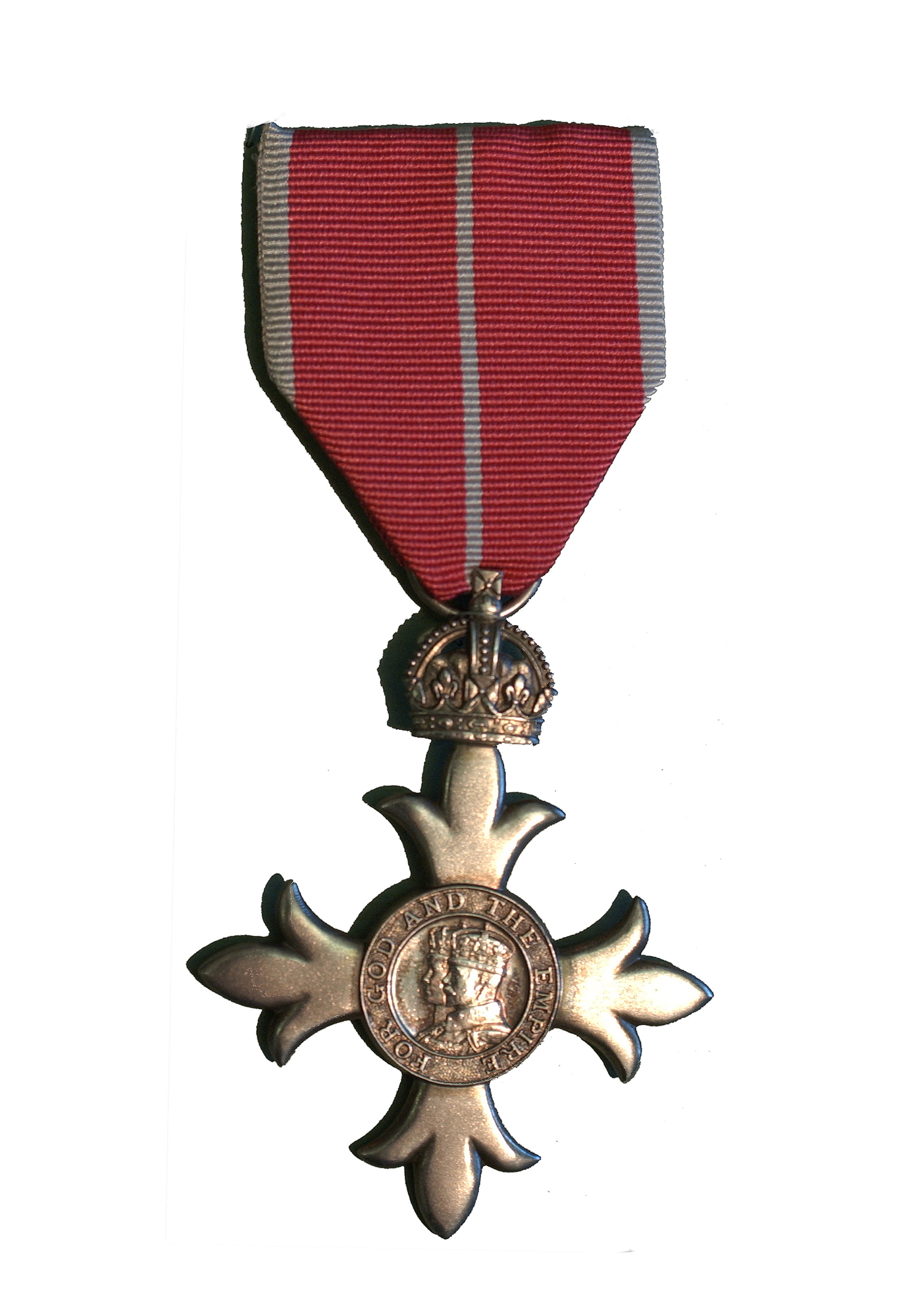
- Born: October 31, 1867; Rugby, Warwickshire
- Died: December 13, 1950; Kensington, London.
- Occupations: Hospital Nurse and Matron
- Known for: Leader of the nursing profession in the UK

Harriet Amelia Alsop MBE SRN (31 October 1867 - 13 December 1950) was a British Nurse, leader of the nursing profession and advocate for nurses and nursing within the Poor Law system.

== Early life ==
Harriet Amelia Alsop was born in Rugby, Warwickshire, England to William and Louise Alsop (nee Webb). Her parents died when she was a young child and she was brought up by her grandfather, an agricultural labourer, and grandmother.

== Early nursing career ==
Alsop undertook nurse training at Birmingham Union Infirmary 1899-1901. Following a period as Assistant Matron at Leeds Union Infirmary, she was appointed matron at Kensington Institution Infirmary in 1907.

== Later nursing career ==
Alsop remained matron at the infirmary, which was renamed as St. Mary Abbots Hospital, until her retirement in 1929. Her contribution to the hospital was acknowledged on her death when a window in the hospital chapel was designed and dedicated to her.

As a matron of a leading Poor Law Infirmary, Alsop was a public advocate for nurse registration, publishing letters of support in the Times newspaper. Alsop was a founding member of Poor Law Infirmaries' Matrons Association, elected to the committee as assistant then Honorary Secretary. Alsop was also an early member of the College of Nursing, later the Royal College of Nursing, and number 148 on their 1916 Register of Nurses. Alsop was also an advocate for the training of nurses in the Poor Law Infirmaries. She was elected in 1923 as a representative of the Poor Law Infirmaries' nurse training schools to the newly established General Nursing Council of England and Wales (GNC). Alsop served on the GNC until 1932. In 1923 Alsop was the GNC's nominated representative on the Minister of Health’s Committee on the Training of Poor Law Nurses.

Alsop was concerned about the situation of retired and poor nurses and advocated for systems for pensions and annuities for nurses. She was a council member of the Royal National Pension Fund for Nurses.

Alsop died on 13 December 1950 in St. Mary Abbots Hospital.

== Honours ==
1918 Lady of Grace of the Order of St John.

1931 Member of the British Empire
