= Ernest Moffitt =

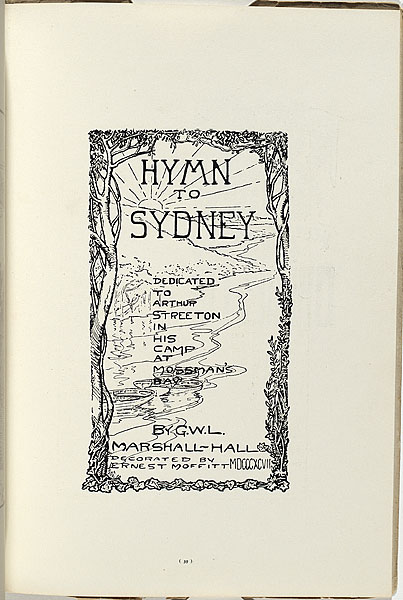
Frontispiece by Moffitt of Marshall Hall's "Hymn to Sydney", dedicated to Arthur Streeton and the Artists' Camps

Ernest Edward Moffitt (15 September 1871 – 23 March 1899) was an Australian artist.

== Life ==
Moffitt was born in Bendigo, Victoria the son of John Thomas Lowry Moffitt, draper, and his wife Mary Emily, née Rogers.

== Legacy ==
Moffitt died unmarried in 1899 aged just 27, he was buried in St Kilda Cemetery. Moffitt was also fond of old English pottery, bound books, carved pipes and Japanese furniture. Marshall Hall financed a book on Moffit by Lionel Lindsay, it acknowledged 'a fine artist and what is saddest, the promise of a great one'.
