= Giulio Anivitti =

Italian born artist, art teacher, portrait painter and gallery curator

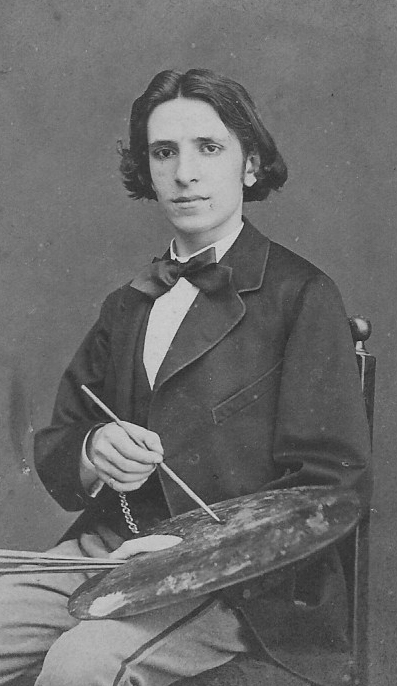
- Born: 1850; Rome
- Died: 2 July 1881; Rome
- Occupations: Artist, curator, art educator

Giulio Anivitti (1850–1881) was an artist, art teacher, portrait painter and gallery curator.

== Early life ==
Born in Rome, Papal States, in 1850 to Luigi Anivitti and Antonia Ermini, he studied at Accademia di San Luca in Rome. He was a pupil of Alessandro Capalti.

== Career ==
He emigrated to Sydney, Australia, in 1874. He was hired to teach painting and drawing at the newly opened Art Training School. From 1875, he participated in annual art exhibits promoted by the New South Wales Academy of Art.

In 1875, he won a gold medal for his portrait of Charles Badham commissioned by the University of Sydney.

In 1876, he had 30 students at the Art Training School. Among his pupils were Amandus Julius Fisher, W.T. Butler, Percy Williams and Frank P. Mahony.

Other commissioned pieces were portraits of William Hovell, Cannon Robert Allwood, Archbishop John Bede Polding, John Sutherland and William Branwhite Clarke. He painted several landscapes of Engineer's Falls, Mount Victoria and a biblical scene entitled David's Youthful Triumph.

== Personal life ==
On 25 July 1877, he married Ellen McGuigan, daughter of John McGuigan a Monaro grazier. They had two children.

== Death ==
He returned to Rome in 1879. He died on 2 July 1881 of tuberculosis. After his death, his wife Ellen married his brother Giuseppe.
