= Joseph Austin Benwell =

English artist, engraver and illustrator (1816–1886)

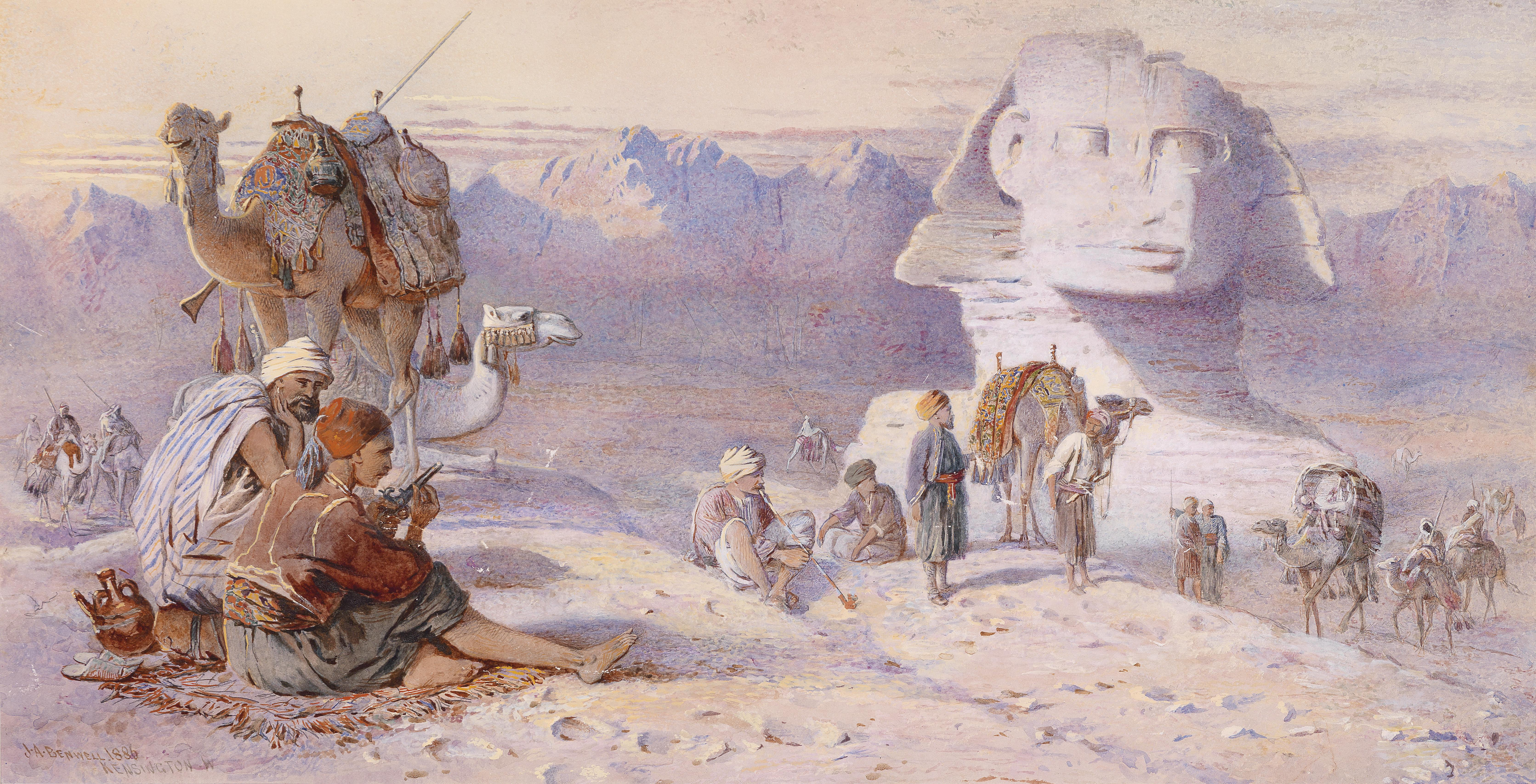
- The Great Sphinx of Egypt, painting by Joseph Austin Benwell 1886
- Born: 26 May 1816; Southwark, London, England
- Died: 13 May 1886 (aged 69); Kensington, London, England
- Resting place: Kensal Green Cemetery, London
- Notable work: Painting, engraving and illustrations
- Movement: Orientalist
- Spouse: Marian Boulton (1821–1892)

Joseph Austin Benwell (1816–1886) was an English artist, engraver and illustrator. He was primarily an artist in the 'orientalist' style. Many of his paintings and engravings were based on his travels in the Near and Middle East, China and India, often featuring camel caravans, Arab scenes and depictions of Indian life.

== Biography ==
Benwell was born on 26 May 1816 at 35 Canterbury Square, Southwark, London, the second son of Joseph Benwell, an accountant, and his wife Charlotte. His birth was recorded in the Society of Friends Register of Births belonging to the Monthly Meeting of Gracechurch Street, London.

His family had been active in the Society of Friends (Quakers) since the late 17th century in Berkshire and later in Somerset and Bristol. His father Joseph was born in Yatton, Somerset, but between about 1810 and 1824 the family lived for some years in London, where several children were born, before moving back to the Bristol area. Benwell's paternal grandfather, John Benwell, was the founder of Sidcot School, the Quaker school in Somerset on its re-establishment in 1808, and was the author of the posthumously-published Extracts from a Diary kept by the late John Benwell of Sidcot... (1825). Joseph Austin Benwell married Marian Boulton (1821–1892), also an exhibiting artist, at St George's, Bloomsbury, London on 13 July 1854.

Various sources give limited information about Benwell's travels. It is known that he entered the service of the East India Company in the 1840s. He travelled to India and China before 1853, and was resident in India and Burma for a while prior to 1856. His entry in The Dictionary of Indian Biography describes him as '...conspicuous for original and pleasing delineations of native life, landscape and buildings in India, evidently drawn on the spot: ...exhibited at the Royal Academy up to 1883:...he painted a series of dissolving views of Indian life, exhibited in London before 1862.' From 1865-1866 he spent time in Egypt and Palestine. When not on his travels he lived in Kensington, London from the early 1860s until his death in 1886. In a survey of Montpelier Street, Kensington, it is noted that 'former residents of the street include the artist Joseph Austin Benwell, a specialist in pictures of India, who was living at No. 44 in 1871'.

One of his better-known works is the coloured lithograph Sketch of a Ward at the Hospital at Scutari c. 1855 which depicts Florence Nightingale in an iconic and reputedly realistic image as the lady with the lamp at Scutari Barracks. Also in the context of the Crimean War, he produced a coloured lithograph depicting the aftermath of the Battle of Alma, The Heights of Alma- the Day after the Battle 1854, and Her Majesty taking leave of the Fusilier Guards previous to their departure to the East which was published in The History of the War with Russia by Henry Tyrrell, 1858.

Benwell was a prolific illustrator for various Victorian religious publications, particularly those published by the Religious Tract Society and with a missionary theme, for example The Sunday at Home: A Family Magazine for Sabbath Reading, The Leisure Hour, a Family Journal of Instruction and Recreation and The Picture Scrap Book series (the latter aimed at Victorian youth) during the 1850s through to the mid-1860s. His entry in the Modern English Biography states that he '...executed thousands of wood blocks for the Religious Tract Society to about 1876, and in Missionary publications; illustrated The Illustrated London News and Sunday at Home for many years...'. The 1862 edition of Sunday at Home refers to '...an interesting series of 'Indian Illustrations of Scripture', delivered in the form of a lecture by the Rev W M Robertson BA of London, with the aid of 'dissolving views' painted by Mr Benwell, formerly of Calcutta, many of whose Indian scenes have already appeared in The Sunday at Home’. Joseph Austin Benwell also provided illustrations for other Victorian periodicals, although not necessarily with a religious theme, including the literary Cornhill Magazine and The Welcome Guest: a Magazine of Recreative Reading for All. He produced illustrations on Indian and Eastern life for The Illustrated London News between 1857 and 1864.

He illustrated several books, including The Three Presidencies of India: a History of the Rise and Progress of the British Indian Possessions, from the Earliest Records to the Present Time by John Capper, 1853; Our Indian Army: A Military History of the British Empire in the East by Captain Rafter, 1855 and Romance of Modern Missions: A Home in the Land of Snows and other Sketches of Missionary Life by Cecilia Lucy Brightwell, 1870.

Later in his life Benwell focused on watercolour and gouache paintings in the style of the Orientalist art movement (Orientalism). Most of his works in this genre were painted from around 1865 up until close to his death in 1886. His subjects were principally Egyptian, Syrian and Arabian; he specialised in Bedouins and their camps and caravans traversing the desert with camels, often with ancient ruins in the background or featuring a 'white camel' in his paintings. He also painted scenes from the Holy Land, mainly of Jerusalem, Palestine and Sinai. It was during this period that he exhibited most widely, at institutions including the Royal Academy, the Royal Society of British Artists, the Royal Institute of Painters in Water Colours, and other institutions and galleries around Britain. He also exhibited at the London International Exhibition of 1873, and the Sydney (1879–80). and Melbourne (1880–81) International Exhibitions. Benwell is referred to in various art dictionaries such as The Dictionary of British Book Illustrators and Caricaturists 1800–1914, The Dictionary of British Watercolour Artists up to 1920, the Dictionary of British Artists 1880–1940, the Dictionary of Victorian Wood Engravers and the Benezit Dictionary of Artists.

Several of Benwell's cousins were artistically talented. His first cousin, William Arnee Frank (1809–1897), the son of his aunt Hannah Benwell, was also an artist who published a series of lithographs of Bristol views in 1831 held at the Fitzwilliam Museum, Cambridge. His landscape watercolours were mostly of views around Bristol, the Wye Valley and North Wales and he was active well into his eighties, still showing work at the West of England Academy in 1891. Another first cousin, son of his aunt Rebecca Benwell, was David Holt (1828–1880), a published poet (including Poems, Rural and Miscellaneous, publ. Gillett 1846; A Lay of Hero Worship, and other poems, publ. Pickering, 1850 and Janus, Lake Sonnets etc. and other Poems, publ. George Bell, 1853). His second cousin (once-removed) was Thomas Benwell Latchmore (1832–1908), the photographer from Hitchin whose works from the early 1860s are documented in the Hitchin Museum and Art Gallery. Another cousin taught art and drawing at a Quaker school.

There were no recorded surviving children from Benwell's marriage to his wife Marian. He died at his home, 13 Abingdon Villas, Kensington, London on 13 May 1886, and was buried at Kensal Green Cemetery, Kensington.

== Selected works ==
=== Selected paintings ===
- Sketch of a Ward at the Hospital at Scutari (c1855)
- The Heights of Alma- the Day after the Battle (1854)
- A Caravan passing the Statues of Memnom (1876)
- Caravan with the Pyramids and Sphinx beyond (1868)
- A Camel Train leaving Luxor, Egypt (1874)
- Travellers at Luxor (1877)
- Caravan in the Desert (1867)
- Watering the Camels (1875)
- Outside the Temple of Dendera (1877)
- White Camel (1877)
- Halt for Prayer under Mount Horeb (1865)
- The Head of the Caravan, Mount Sinai (1882)
- Halt by the Red Sea
- A Rest before the City Gates
- Egyptian Muleteer
- An Arab Encampment
- Carpet Dealers at Philae (1885)
- Arabian Market (1886)
- The Great Sphinx of Giza (1886)
- The Temple of Isis, Philae (1877)
- Arabs drinking coffee and smoking at the Temple of Isis, Philae (1877)
- The Board Game (1870)
- A Group of Arabs at Prayer, with distant camels
- Desert Travelling, Valley of Sinai
- Crossing the Desert

=== Examples of illustrations and engravings in books and journals ===
Several of Benwell's engravings for the ILN depict scenes from the Indian Mutiny of 1857–58, for example: 'Hindostanee dhoolie, used by hospitals and in the field' 1857; ‘Elephant Battery on the March’ (front cover, 8 May 1858); 'Camel Jingalls' 1858 (small cannons mounted on camels); ‘Elephant-washing’ and ‘Elephant Camp, Raneegunge’ 1858. Others include: 'Watering the Streets of Calcutta' 1858; 'Dawk Walas (Postmen) of Bengal' 1858; ‘Perils of Dawk travelling in India- Appearance of a tiger and flight of the Palkee-bearers, and The traveller in his palanquin beset by wolves, hyenas and jackals’ 1858; 'The Keranchie, or Kidrapore, Omnibus' 1859; 'Mehtahs, or Street-Sweepers in Calcutta' 1860; 'Cingalese Boat' 1860; 'Easter Pastimes in Syria'-‘Peasant girls dancing in a Circle' and 'The Shebab' 1860; 'Calisthenic exercises in India' 1860; ‘Fellah Marriage Procession in Latakia’ 1860; 'Methods of conveying cotton in India to Ports of Shipment' 1861; 'Weighing cotton at Bombay for the English Market' 1862; ‘Diving for sponges on the Coast of Syria’ 1862; ‘Modes of Travelling in India’ 1863; 'An Elephant taking care of children' 1863; 'Guebers of India worshipping the setting sun' 1863; 'A Stampede of Jackals through the Environs of Calcutta' 1864; 'A Squad of elephants saluting the Commandant at Dinapore, India' 1864; 'Milkwomen in the Camp' 1864; 'Performing Goat' 1864; 'Ganges Pilgrims passing a Ghaut' 1864; 'Hindoo bathers in the river Jumna surprised by a snake' 1864; 'Shoeing a Bullock in India' 1864; 'Indians of Peru and Bolivia, South America' 1864; 'An Indian Harlequin playing the Tiger' 1864; 'Cattle-looting on the frontier of Scinde' 1864, Tunis water-carriers, 1864.

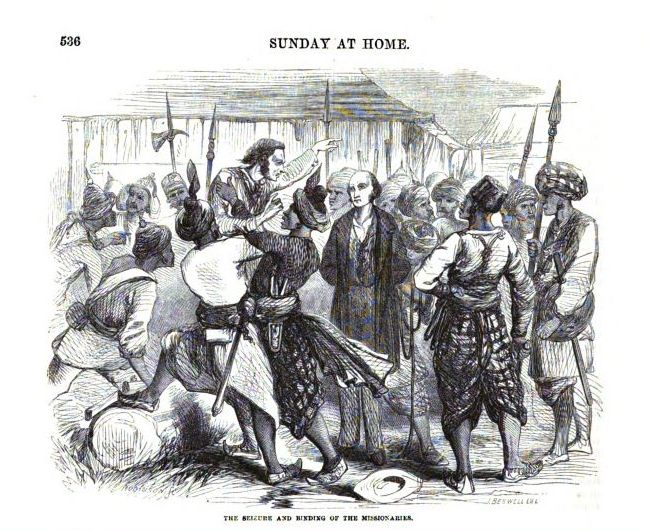
The Seizure and Binding of Missionaries, 1857

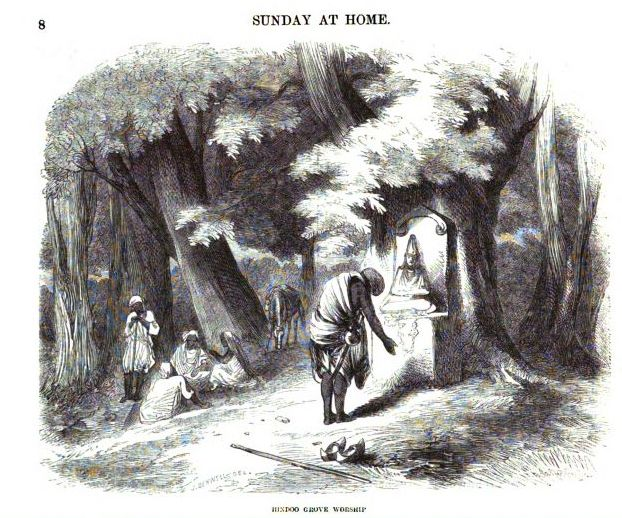
Hindu Grove Worship, 1858

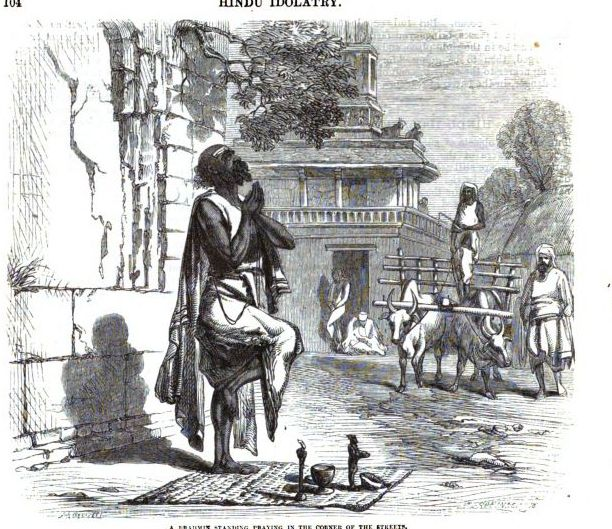
A Brahmin standing in Prayer on a Street Corner, 1863
- The Three Presidencies of India: a History of the Rise and Progress of the British Indian Possessions, from the Earliest Records to the Present Time by John Capper, 1853. Publisher: Ingram, Cooke and Co., London
- Our Indian Army: A Military History of the British Empire in the East by Captain Rafter, 1855. Publisher: David Bryce, London
- The Leisure Hour, A Family Journal of Instruction and Recreation 1857, 1858, etc. Publisher: Religious Tract Society, London. Series illustrated by Benwell in The Leisure Hour include: ‘Tales Illustrative of Chinese Life and Manners’(1857) p449-p513; 'The Indian Nabob: or, A Hundred Years Ago' (1858) p1-p417
- The Cornhill Magazine 1860. Publisher: Smith, Elder and Co, London
- ‘Romance of Modern Missions; A Home in the Land of Snows; and other Sketches of Missionary Life’ 1870 by Cecilia Lucy Brightwell. Publisher: Religious Tract Society, London
- Narratives for Youth Vol 2’, [186?]. Held at the National Art Library, Victoria & Albert Museum. Publisher: John Stabb, London WC, English Monthly Tract Society, London
- The Sunday at Home, a Family Magazine for Sabbath Reading Publisher: Religious Tract Society, London. Series illustrated by Benwell in The Sunday at Home include: 'Missionary Perils' (1857); 'Nurse Grand In India' (1857); ‘Light from the East' (1857, 1858, 1859); ‘Systems and Superstitions of the Chinese’ (1858); ’‘The Martyr Church of Madagascar’ (1859); 'True Story of an Irish Boy' (1859); ‘Notes of a Medical Missionary (to the Jews)’ (1861);. ‘Leaves from my Portfolio by a Missionary in Bengal' (1862); ‘Indian Experiences in 1857-58’ (Indian Mutiny) (1862); ‘The Fountain Kloof: or, Missionary Life in South Africa’ (1863)
- ‘Picture Scrap Book’ (2) Bible Pictures &C’ 1864/5. Publisher: Religious Tract Society, London
- The Picture Scrap Book; or Happy Hours at Home 1859. Publisher: Religious Tract Society, London
- The Welcome Guest: a Magazine of Recreative Reading for All, 1858–1861. Publisher: Houlston and Wright, London
- ‘Nurse Grand’s reminiscences at Home and Abroad’ 1871, by Cecilia Lucy Brightwell. Publisher: Religious Tract Society
- The Folded Lamb; or Memorials of an Infant Son by Ellen M Rogers, 1857. Held at the National Art Library, Victoria & Albert Museum (title page). Publisher: Werteim & Macintosh, London
- The Picture Gallery of the Nations 187[2]. Incl. 'Hindoos' from p. 142 and 'Chinese' p. 164. Publisher: Religious Tract Society, London.
- Hindoo Life -with Pictures of the men, women and children of India by Rev Edward Webb, 1866. Publisher: Philadelphia Presbyterian Publication Committee
- The Children of India written for the Children of England by one of their Friends by Annie Westland Marston, 1883. Incl. pp22, 24, 62 and others. Publisher: Religious Tract Society, London.
- The Fountain Kloof: or, Missionary Life in South Africa 18[--]. Publisher: Philadelphia Presbyterian Publication Committee ( illustrations as in ‘Sunday at Home’ 1863, refer above, but original J A BENWELL signature overwritten or omitted)
- Her Majesty taking leave of the Fusilier Guards previous to their departure to the East, The History of the War with Russia giving full details of the Operations of the Allied Armies, Vol 1, Henry Tyrrell, 1858
- True Tales about India, its Native Princes and British Rulers,1876 by S J Ballard (of Mangalore). Publisher: Religious Tract Society, London.
- Rays From The East, or Illustrations of the Holy Scriptures, derived principally from the Manners, Customs, Rites, and Antiquities of Eastern Nations 1871. Publisher: Religious Tract Society, London.
- Indian Gems for the Master's Crown 1892 by Miss Droese of Landour, India. Publisher: Religious Tract Society, London.
- Various Issues of the Illustrated London News (ILN) 1857- 1864, and also the French L’Univers Illustre.

== See also ==
- List of Orientalist artists
- Orientalism
