= Scarsdale Villas =

Street in Kensington, London

Coordinates: 51°29′50.03″N 0°11′42.22″W

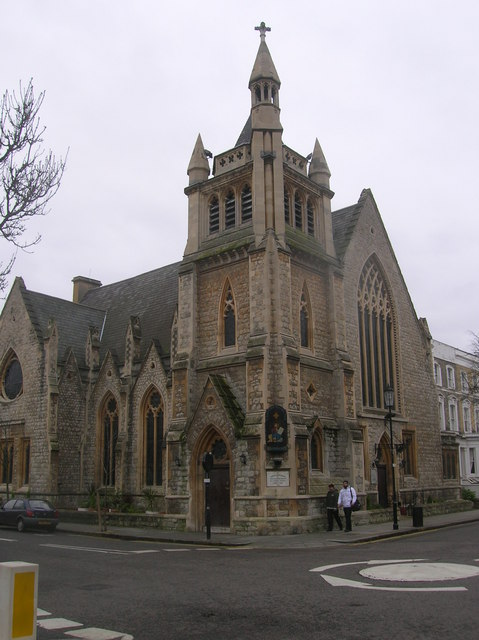
St Mark's Coptic Church, at the junction with Allen Street

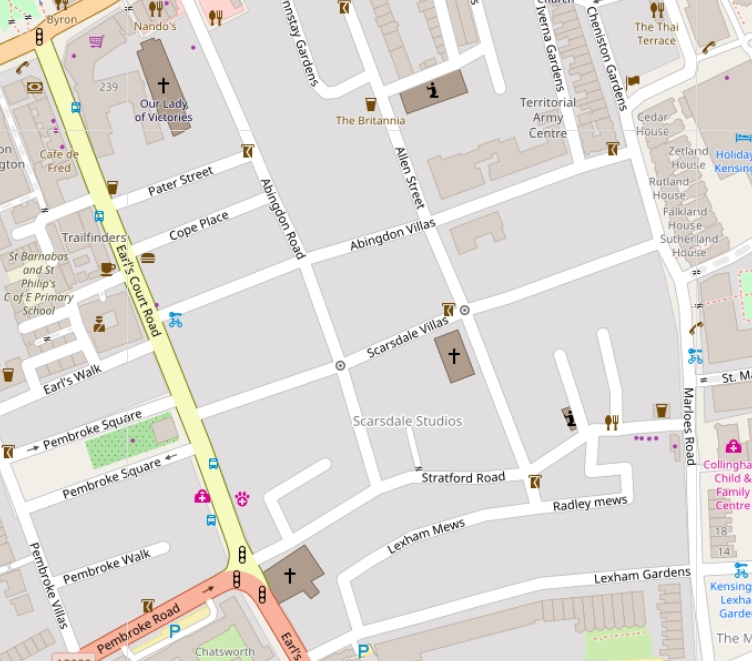
Scarsdale Villas (centre)

Scarsdale Villas is a street in Kensington, London, that runs roughly west to east from Earls Court Road to Marloes Road, with crossroads at Abingdon Road and Allen Street en route. Houses were built there from 1850 to 1864.

== Notable residents ==
- The artist John William Waterhouse gave his address as No. 1, in 1874 when Sleep and his Half-brother Death was exhibited at the Royal Academy. However, in the 1871 census he was living at No. 11. An 1873 electoral register lists John William Waterhouse's father, William, at No 11.
- The architect Frank Chesterton (1877–1916) lived there, at least in 1911.
- The actor, writer, director and broadcaster Val Gielgud (1900–1981), brother of the actor John Gielgud, lived "for the most part uncomfortably" in "a tiny house", "what could more accurately have been described as one of a row of Victorian workmen's cottages than a house", in Scarsdale Villas prior to 1933. This is an odd description, since most properties in Scarsdale Villas appear to be four storeys high if one includes the basement area. His cat Bronx was buried in the front garden beneath a stone reading "BRONX, a Good Cat". He later wrote "I have often wondered if that little stone is still standing in that patch of earth. But I have never had the nerve to go and see. It is long odds that as a result of some Local Building Improvement Scheme the house itself exists no longer". In fact there is no obvious evidence of post-1933 demolition anywhere along the street.
- The musician and comedian Michael Flanders lived there; his problems with getting safely out of his car in a wheelchair forms the introduction to the song The Gnu.
- The satirist and cartoonist Willie Rushton was living there in 1961, and in his bedroom there, the first issue of Private Eye was created.
- The landscape artist James Burrell Smith was living at No. 13 in 1871.
