= Abingdon Villas =

Street in Kensington, London

Coordinates: 51.49802°N 0.19452°W

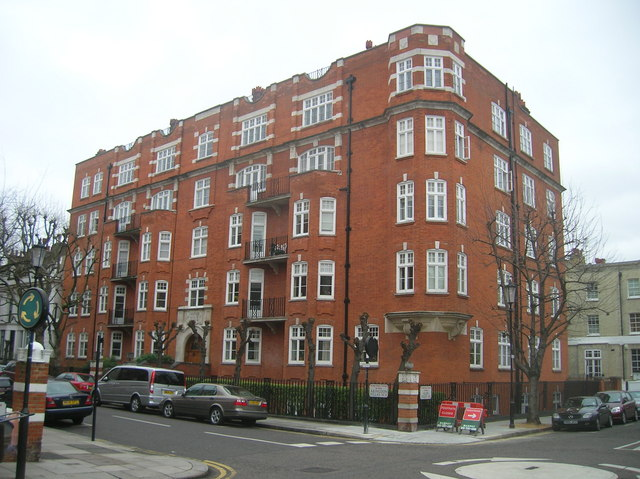
Abingdon Villas Mansions in 2008 (built as Abingdon Gardens)

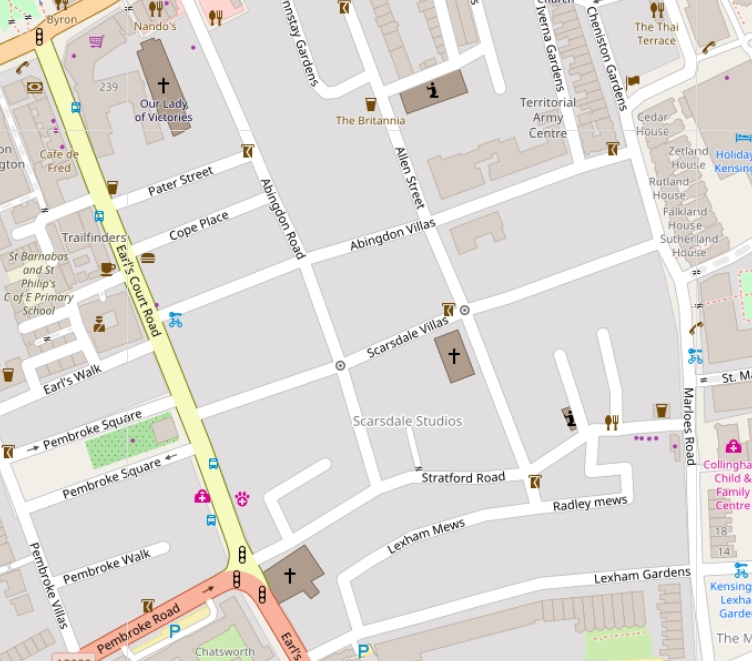
Abingdon Villas (centre)

Abingdon Villas is a street in Kensington, London, that runs roughly west to east from Earls Court Road to Marloes Road, with crossroads at Abingdon Road and Allen Street en route.

The street was developed in stages from 1852 to 1864. Initially, it was just houses, although later two blocks of flats were built, Abingdon Court (1901–1903) and Abingdon Gardens (1904), and the freeholder was the politician Henry Labouchère. The Abingdon pub is on the corner with Abingdon Road.

The sculptor Matthew Noble died at his home at no 43 in 1876, of pleuropneumonia.

In 1876, the artist, engraver and illustrator Joseph Austin Benwell died at his home at no 13.
