= Sleep and His Half-Brother Death =

Painting by John William Waterhouse

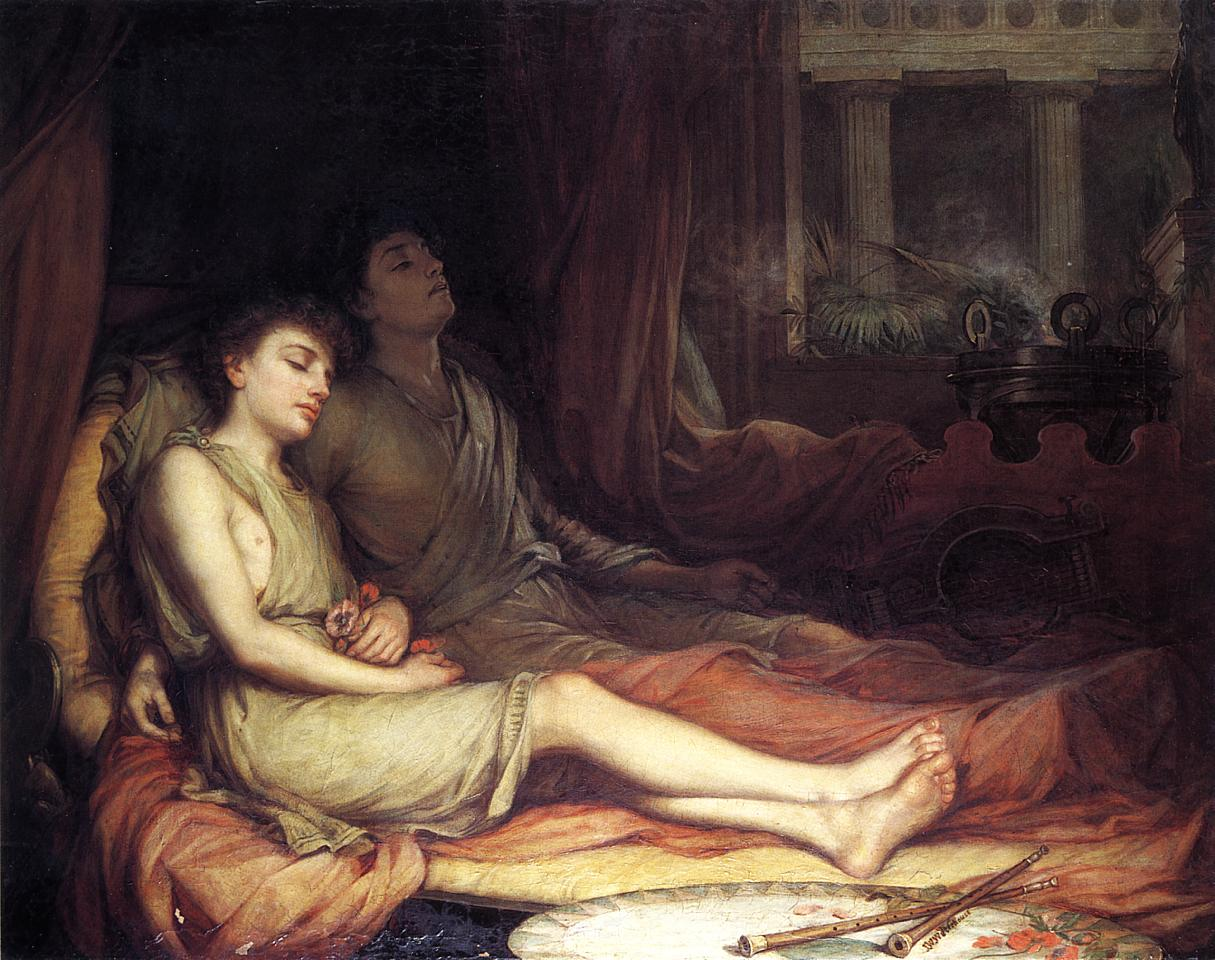
- Artist: John William Waterhouse
- Year: 1874
- Medium: Oil on canvas
- Dimensions: 70 cm × 91 cm (28 in × 36 in)

Sleep and His Half-Brother Death is a painting by John William Waterhouse completed in 1874.

Waterhouse's first Royal Academy exhibit (submitted from his father's house at 1 Scarsdale Villas), it was painted after both his younger brothers died of tuberculosis.

== Hypnos and Thanatos ==
The painting itself is a reference to the Greek gods Hypnos (sleep) and Thanatos (death) who, in Greek mythology, were brothers. Despite their similar poses in the painting, the character in the foreground is bathed in light, while his brother is shrouded in darkness; the first therefore represents Sleep, the latter Death. The personification of Sleep clasps poppies, symbolic of narcosis and dreamlike-states.

== See also ==
- List of paintings by John William Waterhouse
