= Curlew Camp =

Coordinates: 33°50′36″S 151°14′16″E

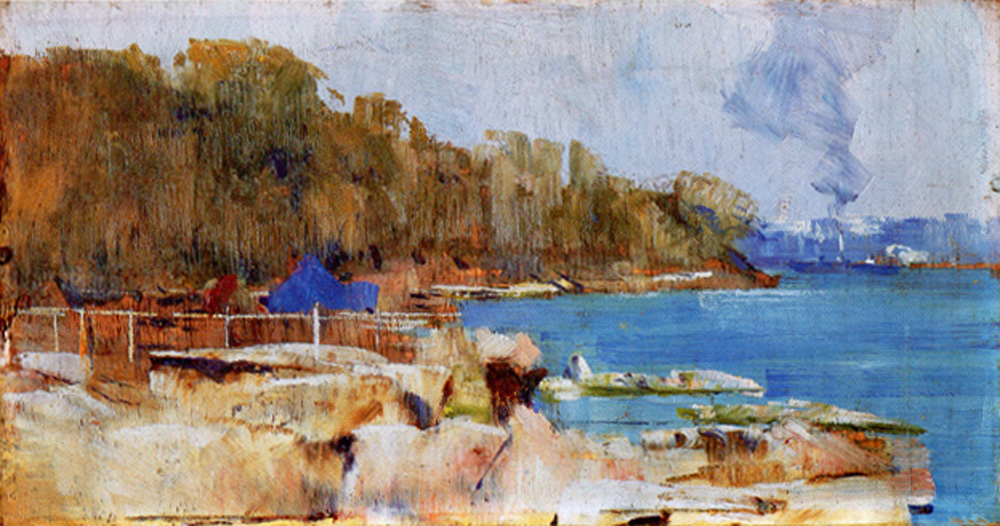
Arthur Streeton's Sirius Cove (c. 1890) shows the eastern shore of Little Sirius Cove where Curlew Camp was located.

Curlew Camp was an artists' camp established in the late 19th century on the eastern shore of Little Sirius Cove, now part of Greater Sirius Cove in Sydney. It was home for some years to several leading Australian artists, such as Arthur Streeton and Tom Roberts of the Heidelberg School, and it was from here that some of their most famous paintings were created. Today the site is still in its natural state and the Mosman Council has built a foreshore walk called the "Curlew Camp Artist's Walk" which traces the journey that the residents of the camp followed when they disembarked from the ferry at South Mosman ferry wharf, then known as "Musgrave Street Wharf," and returned to the camping site. The walk starts at the wharf and continues along the harbour's edge for 1.6 km until it finishes at Taronga Zoo Wharf.

== Early days ==
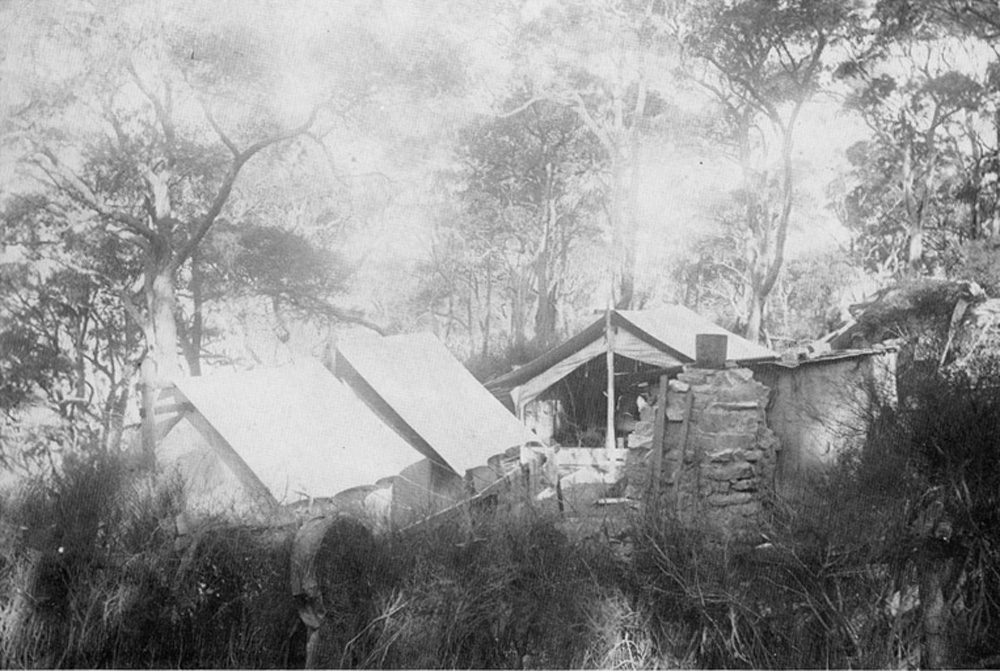
Curlew Camp before 1900

Curlew Camp was originally established in about 1890 by Reuben Brasch who was a wealthy clothing manufacturer and owned a Department store in Sydney. He and his brothers used the camp on weekends for recreation. In about 1891 Arthur Streeton first moved into Curlew Camp when he came from Melbourne where he had lived in the Heidelberg camp. At this time he was 24 years old. Tom Roberts joined him soon after. As a source of income they held art classes in a Sydney studio. An advertisement. was placed in a newspaper in 1893 for one of these classes (see ad on right). Both artists were plein air painters so camp life in the outdoors suited them well.

In these early years the Curlew camp was quite small but well organised and comfortable. Streeton described it to a reporter in his later years when he was about 73 years old. He said that besides the Brasch brothers there were a few other men. They had half a dozen tents between them and there was a dining tent, a dancing floor and even a small piano. He said that they lived well for 12/6 a week. Julian Ashton was mainly a resident of a nearby artist's camp at Balmoral but he did visit Curlew occasionally. In his later years he remembered Streeton and Roberts.

"I saw Streeton fairly often at this time. He lived in a camp at Little Sirius Cove, Mosman, where he was joined later on by Tom Roberts. He used to do the marketing, and on arriving at the Musgrave Street wharf had to walk around the point and blow a whistle for the boat to come across from the camp. To see him returning on Saturday nights, laden with parcels of bread, beer and beef, and as merry the while as a boy at a picnic, was a delight. In those days the painters' material wants were few, but their hopes were unbounded.""

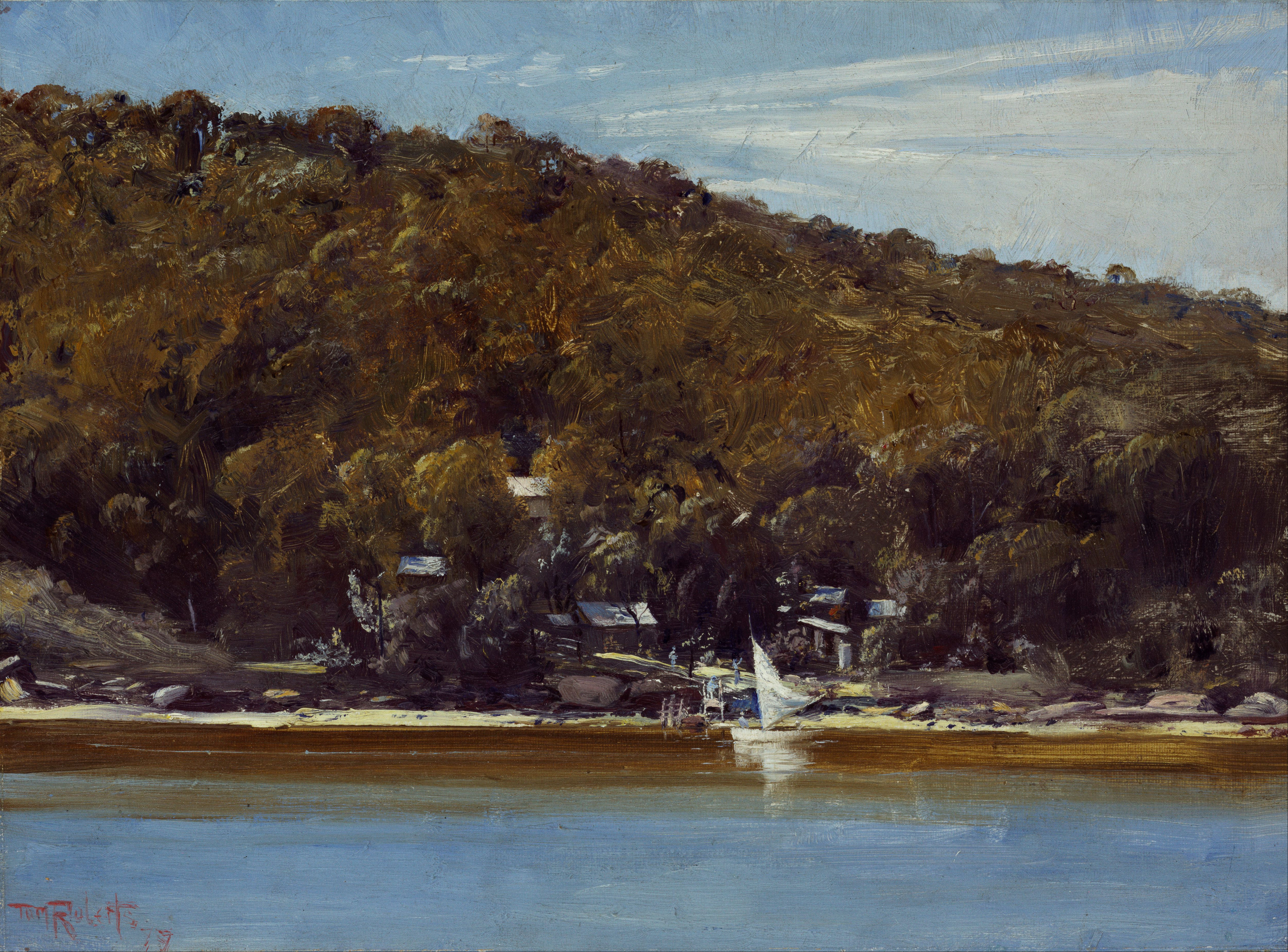
Curlew Camp, Sirius Cove, painted by Roberts in 1899, shows the camp from the opposite shore of Curraghbeena Point.

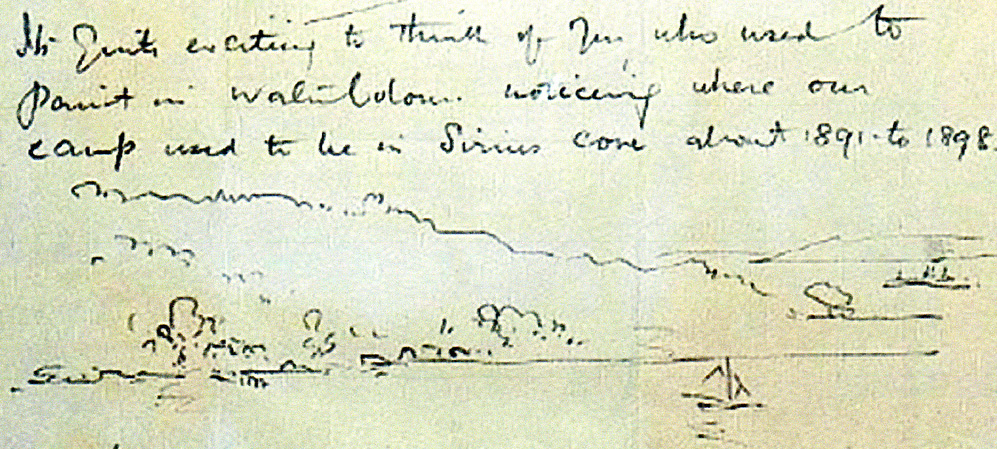
Sketch of Sirius Cove from the same vantage point as the above painting by Streeton in a 1943 letter to another painter

While he was at the camp Streeton wrote many letters to his friends and in some of them he gives colourful descriptions of life in the camp. In the early 1890s he wrote

"I sit here in my tent and look across the little bay beneath to the hill beyond, all in massive purple shadow – right across which comes a beautiful mass of clematis and begonia creeper, the stem of a red gum sapling and a young wild cherry tree. Below a few feet is my box with mignonette opening its second set of leaves to the brilliant warmth of the sun which floods all the green and cheerful surroundings of our tent making it like a fairy's bower. All the morning I've been wandering about the hill of bush behind our camp gathering flowers and delicate ferns to plant in our little summer house close by."

In April 1891 he wrote

"Around the tent climb the Begonia and Clematis and Sarsaparilla the rough winds broken for us by an exquisite fusion of tender gum-leaf. Honeysuckle (like the trees of the old asters). Cotton plants heath and a wild cherry (bright green at our tent door) and the beautiful flood beneath. All is splendid."

"Tis now 11 O’clock. My tent stands like a quiet glowing lamp on the deep black hill – the sombre night all round – a southerly gale sweeps over the bay the boat bumps against the pier below. All alone in the camp tonight."

In 1896 he wrote

"Saturday 9 pm. In our tent at Mossman’s Bay – the front of our tent thrown open wide and the night sky is deep green blue and below the great hill the bay reaches down into a deep wonderful gulf under the sea. Picnic parties pulling about quietly through the rare phosphorescence, steamers puffing breathing heavily and fluting away and all with me is melody."

Tom Roberts was 35 when he came to Curlew Camp. He was different from the other artists as he was always well dressed. He wanted to paint portraits and to do this he needed an air of distinction. One artist at the camp said. "He represented the successful artist with the entre to Government House and was on the dining list of people who had a couple of thousand a year.".

In 1896 Tom Roberts married and left the camp to live in Balmain. Streeton stayed for another two years and then in 1898 went to England for some time. He returned to Australia for a short while in 1907 and again visited Curlew Camp. From a vantage point above the site he painted some of his most famous works.

Streeton long remembered his days at Curlew. When he was interviewed in 1940 at his home in the Dandenongs in Victoria, the reporter said that the photo of him at Curlew crouching over his painting (see photo at left) was hung above his mantelpiece and he looked back on this time with fondness. Also a letter written by him to another artist in 1943, almost at the end of his life, indicates that he remembered the camp well. In the letter he sketched a rough diagram of its location on the east side of Sirius Cove (see sketch on right) and said. "It's quite exciting to think of you who used to paint in watercolour noticing where our camp used to be in Sirius Cove about 1891 to 1898."

There were other artists living in the camp in this early period. The most notable was Henry Fullwood who painted a work called "Sirius Cove" in 1895. There were also musicians such as William Marshall-Hall (1862–1915) and Alfred Hill(1870–1960) who resided at the camp.

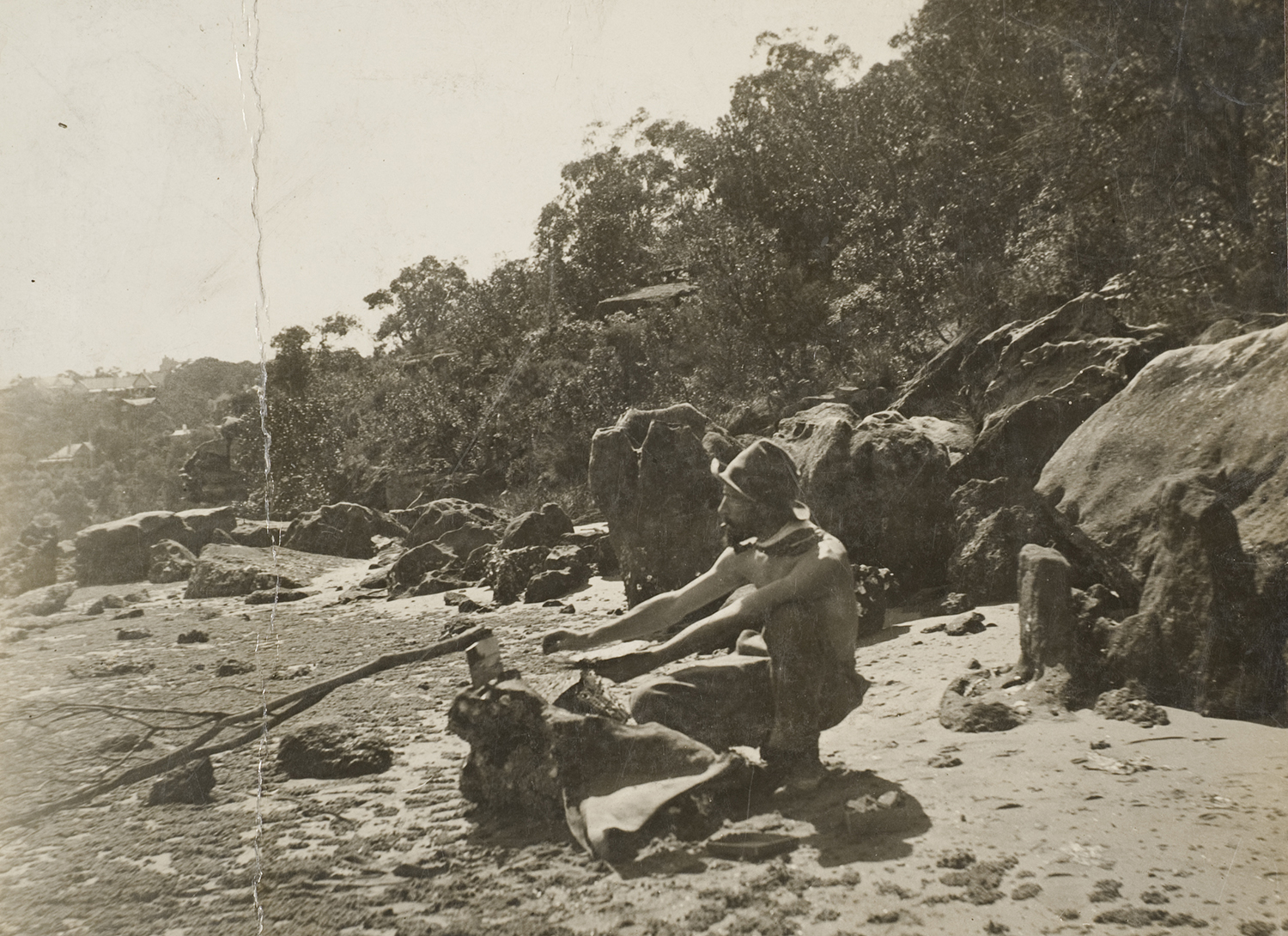
Arthur Streeton painting at Curlew Camp, c 1891

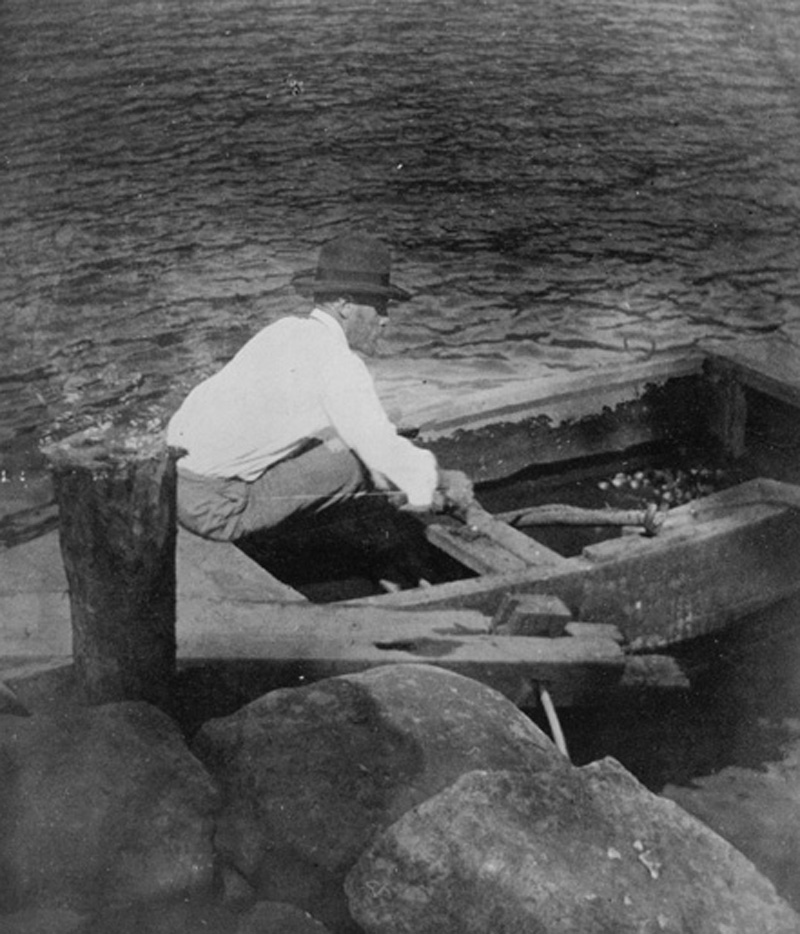
Tom Roberts in a boat at Curlew Camp, c. 1895

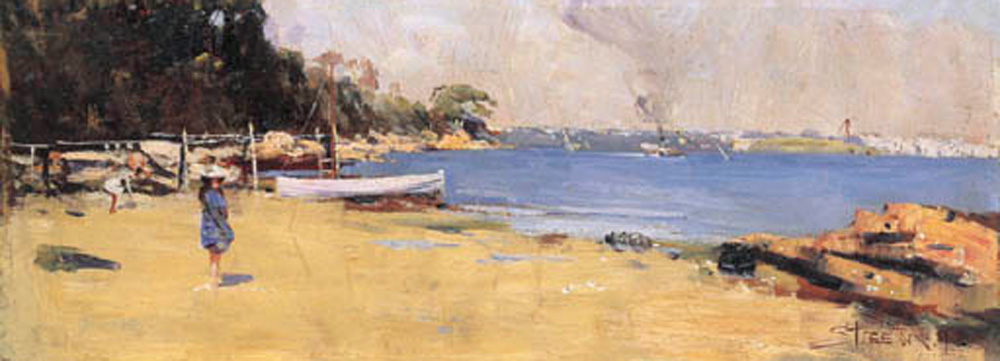
Arthur Streeton, Sirius Cove, New South Wales, 1895

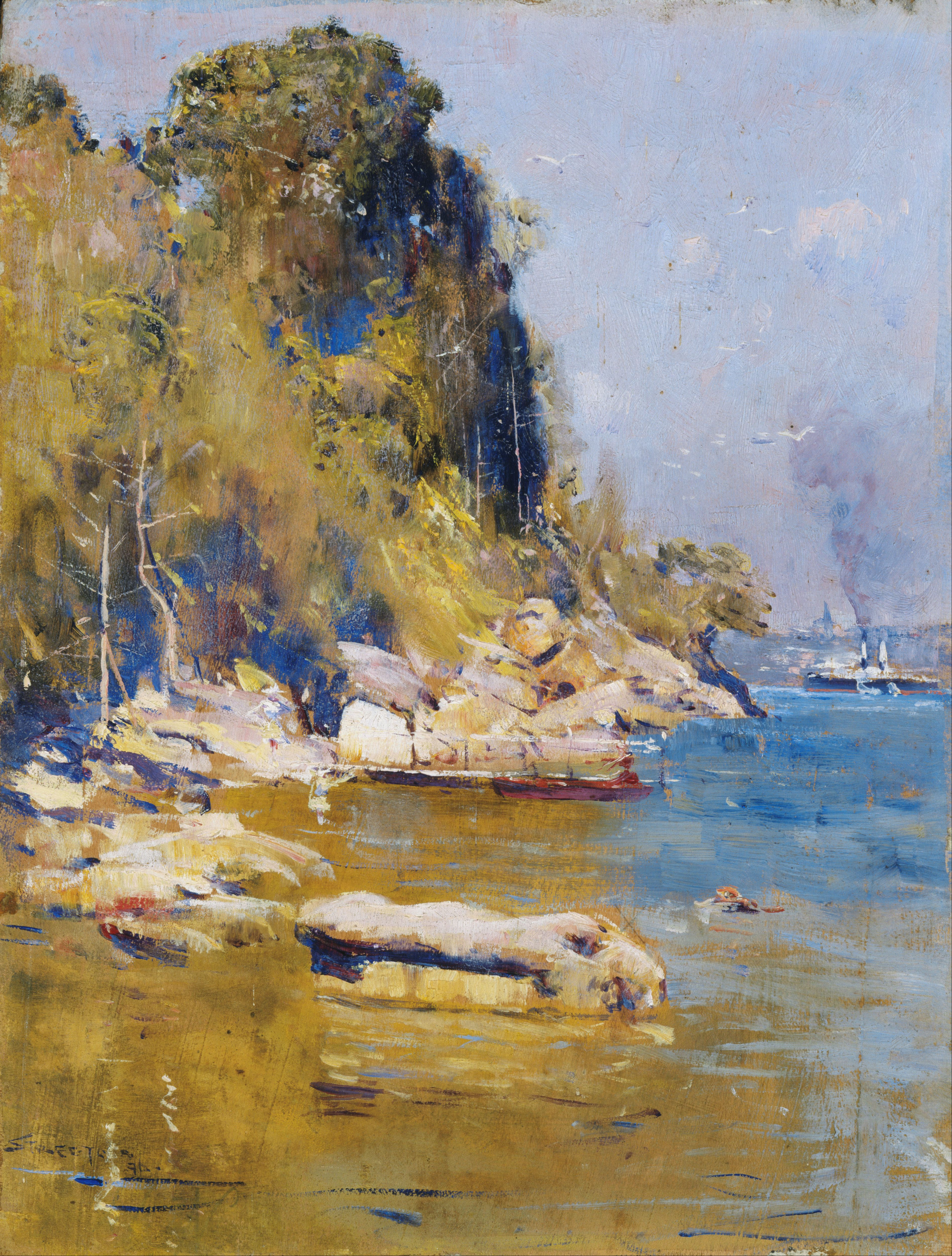
Arthur Streeton, From My Camp, 1896

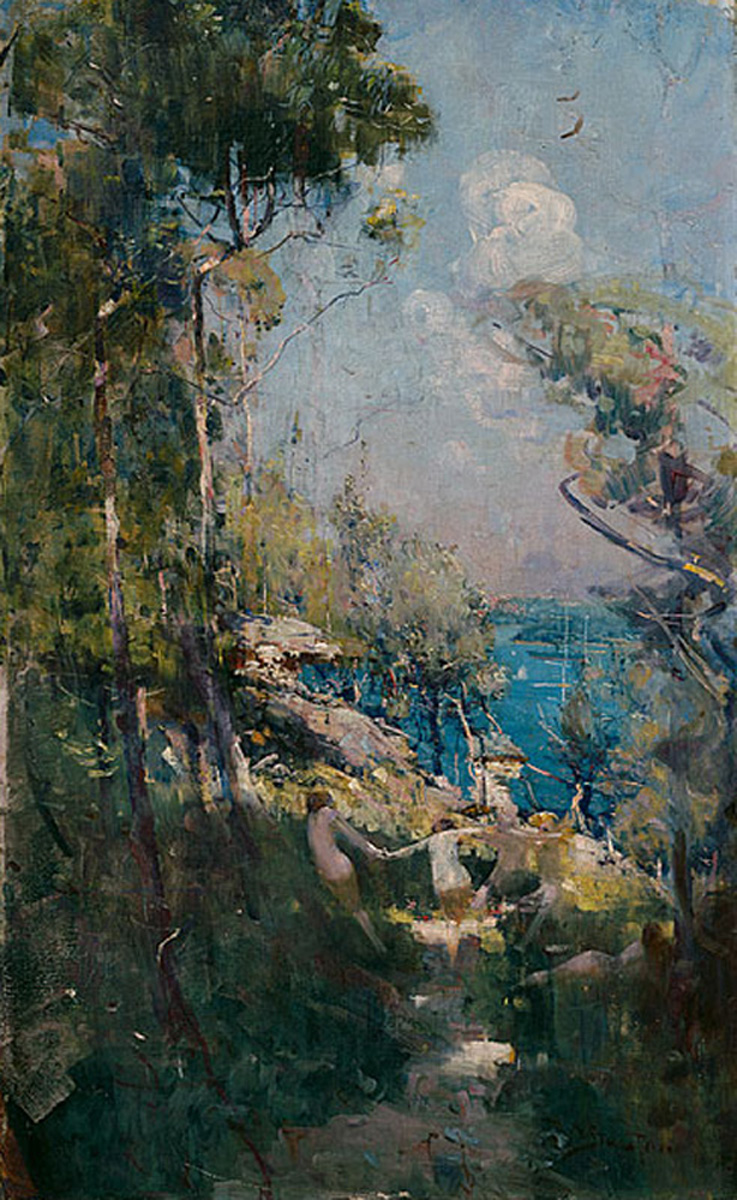
Arthur Streeton, Sydney Harbour Souvenir of Sirius Cove, 1897

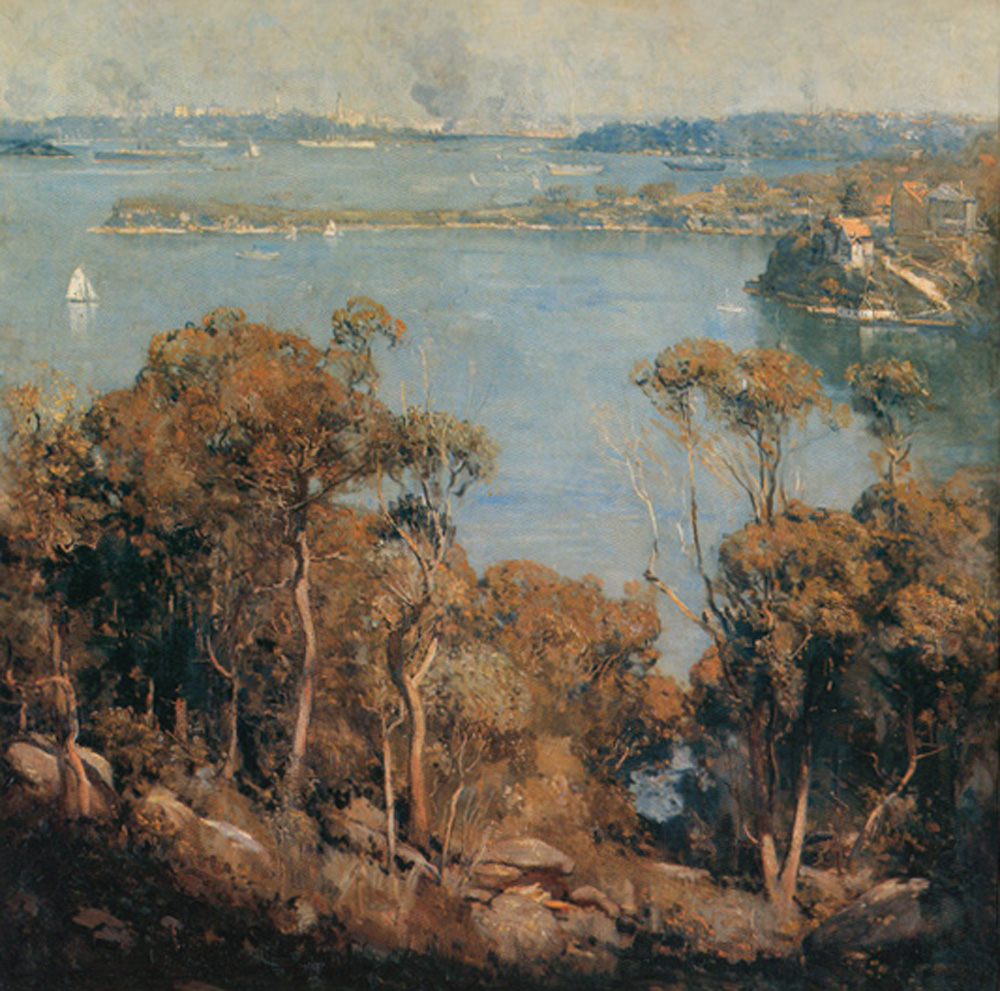
Arthur Streeton, Sydney Harbour, 1907

== Curlew Camp after 1900 ==
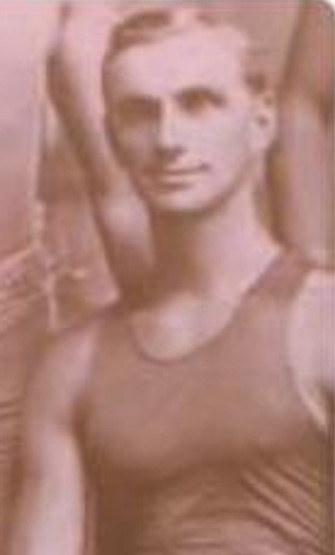
Frederick Lane

After the painters had left Curlew, the camp became more a place for those who were interested in sailing or enjoying the outdoor life. Frederick Lane (1880–1969) became the proprietor of the camp. Lane (see photo right) was a famous Australian Olympic swimmer who won two gold medals at the 1900 Games in Paris. When he returned from the Games, he lived at the camp and commuted to the city where he worked in his printing firm called Smith and Lane. He stayed at the camp until his marriage in 1908. The camp became larger and more structured during this latter period. It now had a weatherboard dining room and a billiards tent known as the tabernacle (see photos below).

The camp closed in 1912 when it was decided to locate the Taronga Park Zoo on the ridge above the site.

The location of the camp was lost until its relics were rediscovered in 1987 by Mr Rob Sturrock of Mosman Rotary Club. In the publications by Rob Sturrock (Pictorial History of Mosman, volumes one and two) is a map, which shows a foot track from Musgrave Street wharf up and over the ridge to Sirius Cove.

Mosman Council has established a Curlew Camp Artists Walk for visitors.

== See also ==
- Sydney artists' camps
- One Summer Again, 1985 docudrama
