= Marloes Road =

Street in Kensington, London

Coordinates: 51.49666°N 0.19230°W

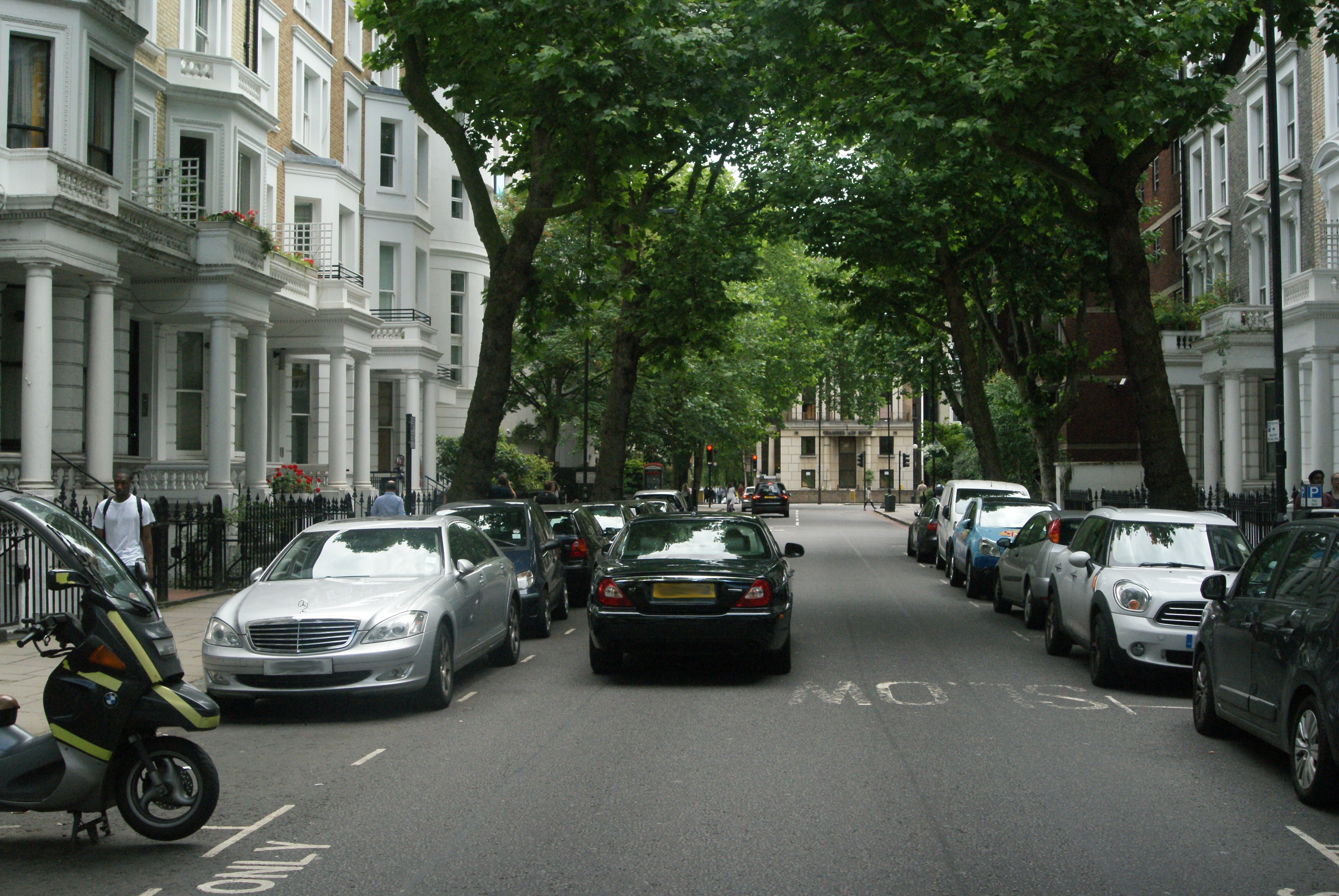
View down Marloes Road to Cromwell Road

Marloes Road is a street in the Kensington area of London, England. It runs roughly south to north, from a T-junction with Cromwell Road to Cheniston Gardens and Abingdon Villas. It has junctions with (inter alia) Lexham Gardens, Stratford Road and Scarsdale Villas.

The southern part was originally called Barrow's Walk, and Marloes Road itself has a "somewhat confusing history".

St Mary Abbots Hospital was built there in 1871 and operated as a hospital until its demolition in 1992, when it was replaced with blocks of flats, which form part of the Kensington Green private gated-community on eight acres of land.

In 1939, the soldier, literary agent and publisher Neville Armstrong and his wife were living at no. 17.
