= James Burrell Smith =

British watercolour and landscape artist (d. 1897)

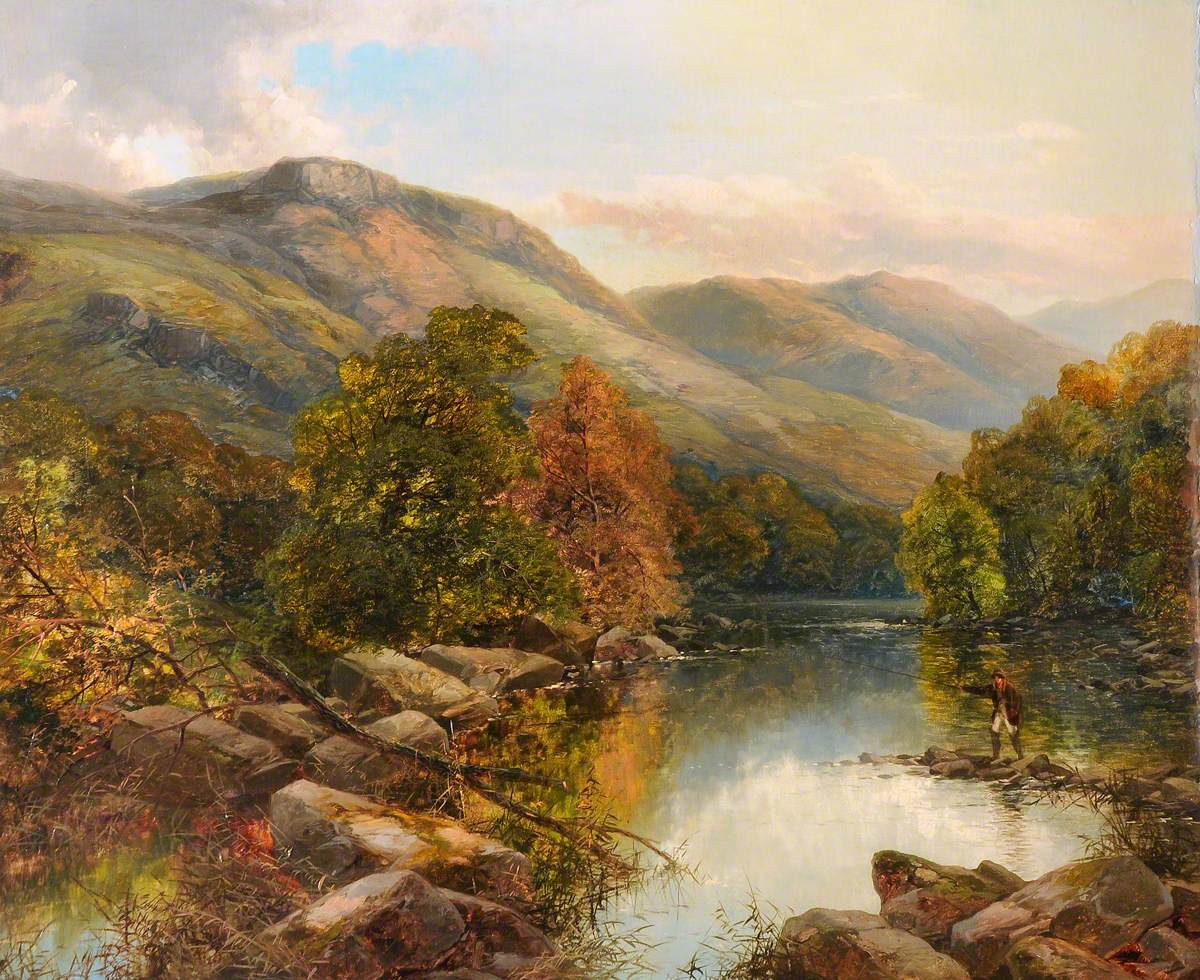
James Burrell Smith: On the Conway, North Wales, with a Man Fishing, c. 1850

James Burrell Smith (died 16 December 1897) was a watercolour and landscape artist. He was born in London. In 1843 he moved to Alnwick, Northumberland where he trained with Thomas Miles Richardson. He travelled around the UK and Europe. During the 1880s, he created some engravings for The Illustrated London News.

== Family ==
James Burrell Smith was baptised in Stepney on 12 April 1829. His parents are listed as James, a revenue officer, and Sarah. He married Eleanor Laidler at Edlingham, Northumberland on 24 April 1850. In the 1871 census, he was living at 13, Scarsdale Villas, Kensington, aged 47, occupation Landscape Painter and birthplace, Stepney, Middlesex.

His second daughter, Sarah Emma Burrell Smith (1854-1943), known as "Cissie", was also a landscape watercolour artist.

== Death ==
James Burrell Smith died at 1a, Mornington Avenue, West Kensington on 16 December 1897.
