= Oliver Chesterton =

British businessman (1913–2007)

Sir Oliver Sidney Chesterton, MC (28 January 1913 – 14 October 2007) was a British businessmen who was managing partner of Chestertons Estate Agency.

Chesterton successfully expanded his family firm's traditional residential portfolio into the commercial sector and The City.

== Biography ==
The son of the architect, Frank Chesterton, he attended Rugby School, before qualifying as a chartered surveyor in 1934, and later was promoted FRICS.

Chesterton attended RMC Sandhurst, before being commissioned in the Irish Guards. He served with distinction during World War II and was decorated with the Military Cross.

After military service, he returned to the family business where his market knowledge was much in demand, not least as a long-serving Commissioner of the Crown Estates.

From 1962, he was a director of The Woolwich, which was in the process of expanding from its south London origins, by a series of acquisitions of smaller societies, to become one of Britain's leading mortgage lenders.

Chesterton was chairman of the Woolwich Equitable from 1976 to 1983, often acting as spokesman for the building society sector as a whole at a time of high interest rates, restricted mortgage availability and, towards the end of his tenure, rapidly rising house prices.

He was also a director of Trust Houses (Forte), the hotel chain whose extensive portfolio included the Grosvenor House in Park Lane. Chesterton served as president of the RICS in its bicentenary year, 1968–69, the first Master of the newly created Chartered Surveyors' Company in 1977, and secretary and president of the Commonwealth Association of Surveying and Land Economy. He also served as Master of the Curriers' Company.

Chesterton was vice-chairman of the Royal Free Medical School, and a governor of Rugby School. He was knighted in the 1969 Birthday Honours.

== Family ==
Chesterton's family had been engaged as land agents in Kensington since the end of the eighteenth century. One of his uncles was the celebrated writer and poet, G. K. Chesterton.

He married, in 1944, Violet Ethel Jameson, who died in 2004. They had two sons and a daughter.

== Honours ==
- - Knight Bachelor (1969)
- - Military Cross (1943)
- - Knight of Malta (1968)
