= Kensington Green =

Estate in Kensington, London

Coordinates: 51°29′51″N 0°11′26″W

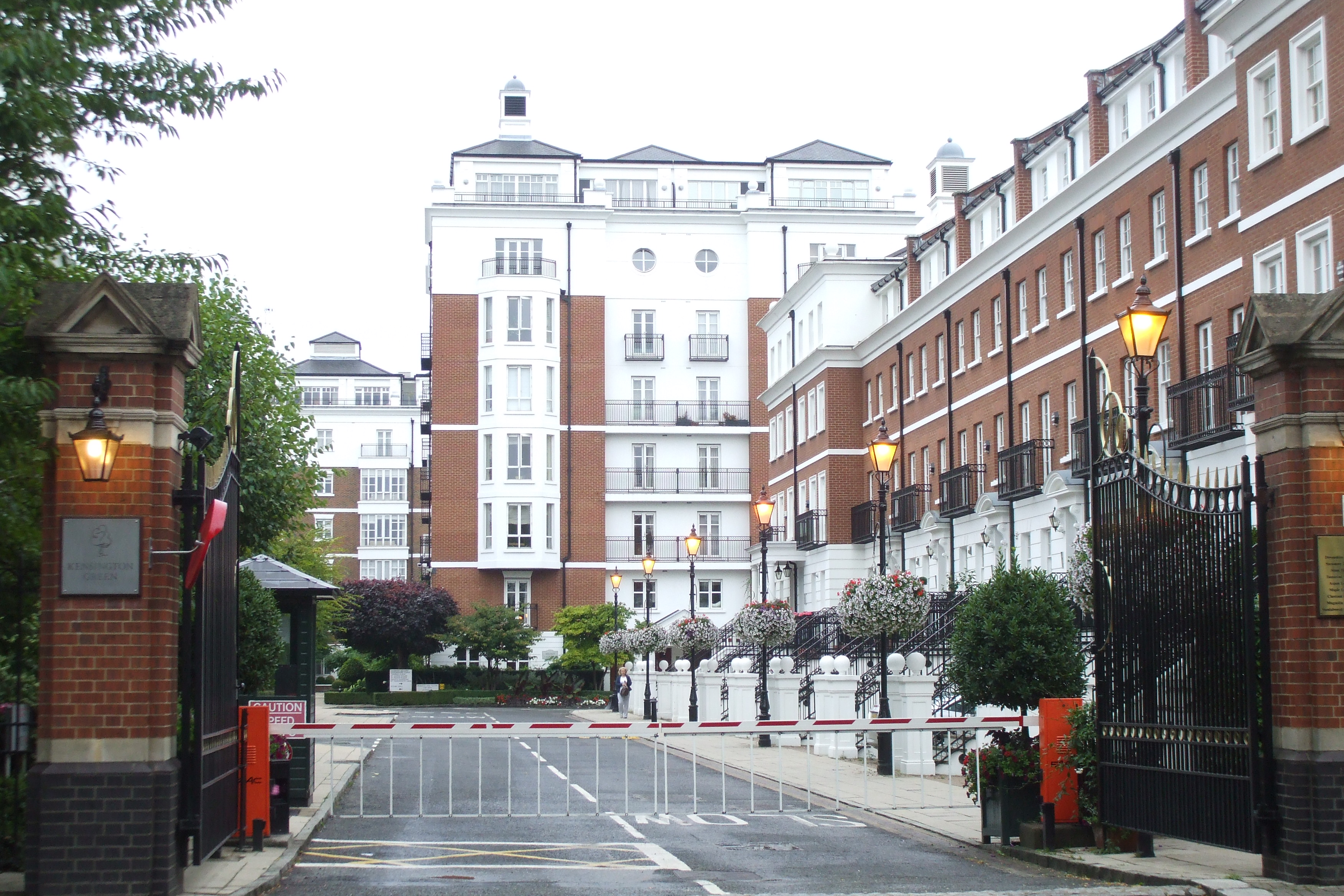
The entrance to Kensington Green on Marloes Road, with the gateposts that formerly served St Mary Abbots Hospital

Kensington Green is a private gated community on eight acres of land east of Marloes Road in the Kensington area of London. It is located on the site of what was previously St Mary Abbots Hospital.

== History ==
The hospital originally opened in 1871 as an infirmary for a workhouse. In 1992, the hospital was closed and its remaining services were moved to the new Chelsea and Westminster Hospital in Fulham Road.

The property was subsequently redeveloped into the luxury housing estate known as Kensington Green. The site's landscaped grounds include Stone Hall Gardens.

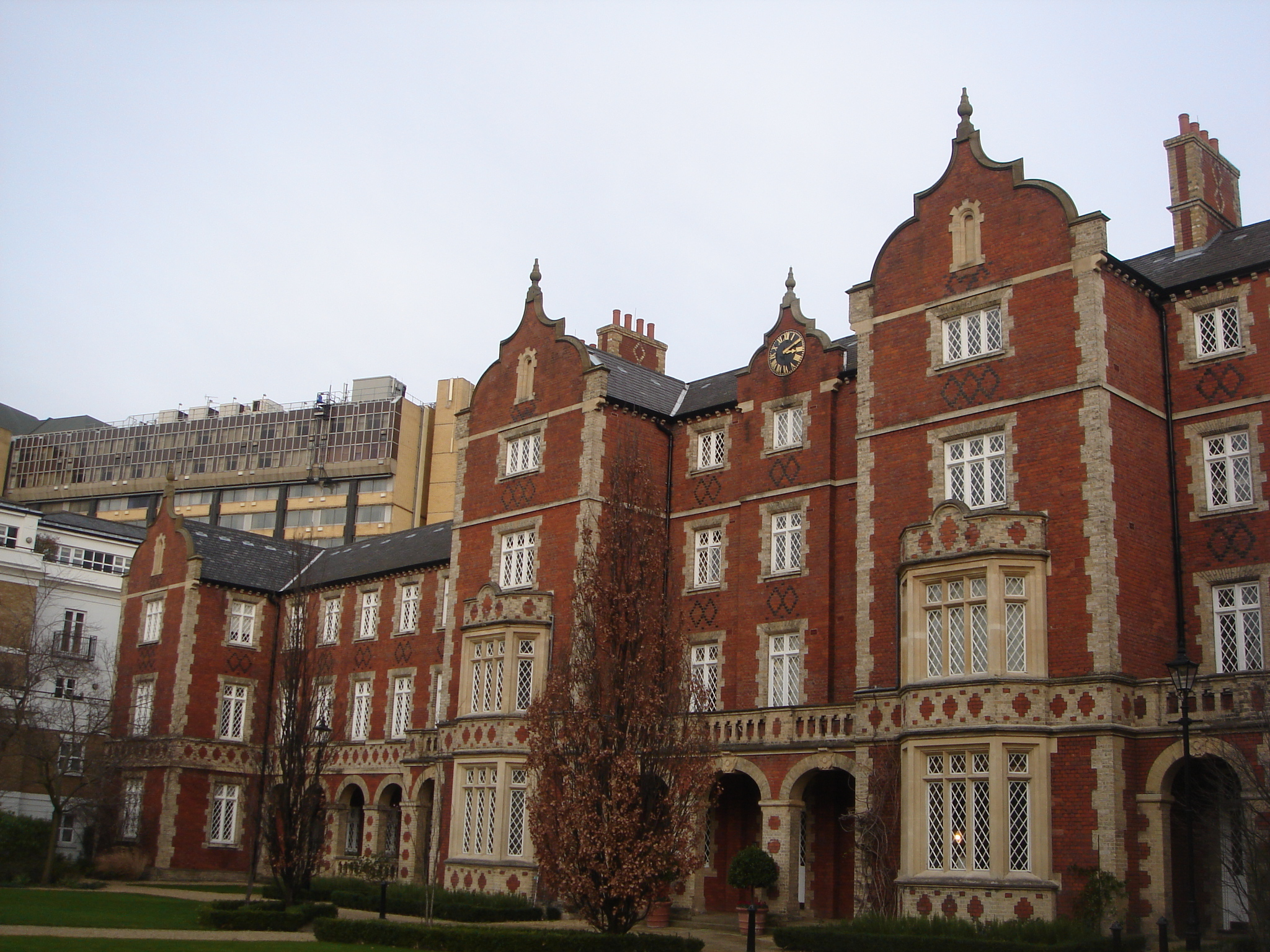
Stone Hall, a Jacobethan-style building

At the centre of the site stands Stone Hall, a Jacobethan-style building that was constructed in 1848 as the main workhouse block and which now contains high-end residential apartments. The hospital's original gateposts, railings and gatehouse on Marloes Road survive at the entrance to the secure residential complex.

Kensington Green has a mix of houses and flats, with 24-hour security and underground parking. Isabel dos Santos, the billionaire daughter of the former president of Angola, is believed to own a house in St Mary's Place on the estate, valued around £21 million. Other streets on the private estate include St Mary's Gate and Chantry Square.

Apartment blocks at Kensington Green include Juniper Court, Magnolia Lodge, Maple Lodge, Oak Lodge, Redwood Mansions, Sandalwood Mansions, Sycamore Lodge, Tamarind Court, and Walnut Court. Stone Hall, now apartments, is a Grade II listed building (since 1989) and was formerly known as the Stonehall Outpatients Clinic.
