= Frank Chesterton (architect) =

English architect (1877–1916)

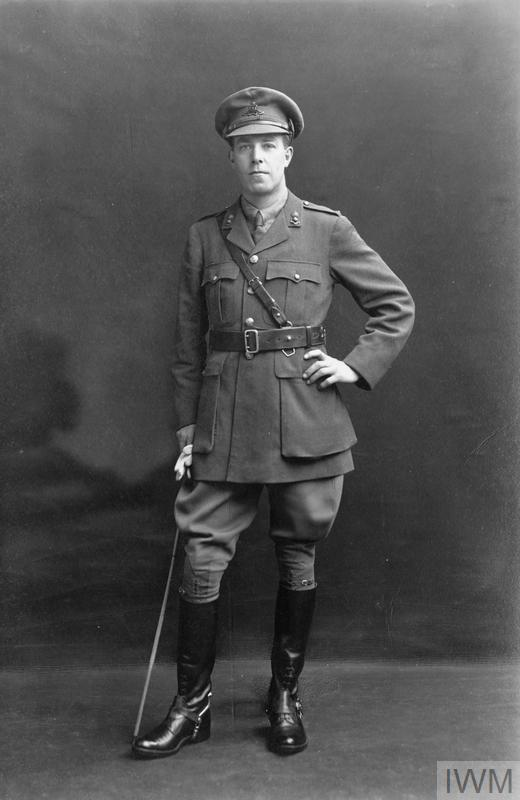
Chesterton in 1916.

Frank Sidney Chesterton (1877 – 11 November 1916) was an English architect.

== Early life ==
He was born in 1877 in Kensington, London, the son of Sidney Rawlins Chesterton and Katherine Eleanor Chesterton. His first cousin was the author G. K. Chesterton.

== Career ==
Chesterton designed the entire terrace of 12–54 Hornton Street, now Grade II listed, and built from 1903.

Chesterton served in the First World War, as a second lieutenant with the Royal Field Artillery, and died on 11 November 1916, aged 39, in the Battle of the Somme. He is buried at Grove Town Cemetery, Meaulte.

== Personal life ==
Chesterton was married to Nora Chesterton, and they lived at 28 Warwick Gardens, Kensington, London, and later at Scarsdale Villas, Kensington.

He was the father of Sir Oliver Chesterton, fifth-generation head of the family's estate agency business, and chairman of the Woolwich Building Society.
