= Cecilia Lucy Brightwell =

English etcher and author

Cecilia Lucy Brightwell (1811–1875), known to her contemporaries as Lucy Brightwell, was an English etcher and author, mostly of volumes of short biographies intended for young people.

== Life ==
Brightwell was born at Thorpe, near Norwich, on 27 February 1811, the eldest child of Thomas Brightwell (Ipswich 1787 – Norwich 1868), and his first wife, Mary Snell (1788 – 1815), daughter of William Wilkin Wilkin, of Costessey, near Norwich, and Cecilia Lucy (Jacomb), a lineal descendant of Thomas Jacomb, ejected from St. Martin's, Ludgate. Simon Wilkin, Brightwell's uncle, edited the works of Sir Thomas Browne.

Her father, a nonconformist solicitor, mayor of Norwich in 1837, was a man of scientific tastes, a good microscopist, and contributor to many scientific journals who discovered the Asplanchna brightwellii, a species of rotifer. He published Notes on the Pentateuch (1840), a compilation, with original notes on natural history: and printed 100 copies of Sketch of a Fauna Infusoria for East Norfolk (1848). In the preparation of the latter work he was assisted by his daughter (a pupil of John Sell Cotman), who drew and lithographed the figures of the various species noted.

Brightwell, who was a good Italian scholar and a remarkably able etcher, owed little to teachers, and followed her own methods. She went little into society. Her philanthropic spirit was shown in her exertions and contribution of £180, for the Brightwell lifeboat put on the Norfolk coast at Blakeney. Her writings, many of which were published by the Religious Tract Society, were mainly biographical, and written for the young. The most important was her first work, the Life of Amelia Opie, (1854); her father was Opie's friend and executor.

For some years before her death she was afflicted with cataract, from which her father had also suffered. She died at Norwich on 17 April 1875, and was buried at the Rosary Cemetery, beside her father.

== Writings ==
- Memorials of the Life of Amelia Opie, selected and arranged from her Letters and Diaries and other manuscripts, Norwich and London, 1854; 2nd edition, 1855 (preface by Thomas Brightwell).
- Palissy the Huguenot Potter, a Tale, 1858, another edition, 1877.
- Life of Linnaeus, 1858.
- Heroes of the Laboratory and Workshop, 1859, 2nd edition 1860.
- Difficulties overcome: Scenes in the Life of A. Wilson, 1860.
- Romance of Incidents in the Lives of Naturalists, 1861.
- Footsteps of the Reformers, 1861.
- Bye-paths of Biography, 1863.
- Above Rubies: Memorials of Christian Gentlewomen, 1864.
- Early Lives and Doings of Great Lawyers, 1866.
- Annals of Curious and Romantic Lives, 1866.
- Annals of Industry and Genius, new edition, 1869, another edition, 1871.
- Memorials of the Life of Mr. Brightwell of Norwich, 1869 (printed for private circulation).
- The Romance of Modern Missions, 1870.
- Georgie's Present, or Tales of Newfoundland, 1871.
- Memorial Chapters in the Lives of Christian Gentlewomen, 1871.
- Nurse Grand's Reminiscences at Home and Abroad, 1871.
- My Brother Harold, a Tale, 1872.
- Lives of Labour: Eminent Naturalists,.
- Men of Mark, a Book of Short Biographies, 1873, another edition, 1879.
- So Great Love : Sketches of Missionary Life and Labour (her last publication).

== Etchings ==
Among her published etchings were: two views of Mr. Page's house, Ely, formerly residence of Oliver Cromwell (etched in two sizes, though only the larger was published); two views of Ranworth Decoy (in Lubbock's Fauna of Norfolk); Bromeholme Priory (frontispiece to Green's History of Bacton).

A local print gives the following as a complete list of her unpublished etchings:

- After Rembrandt: the Mill; the Long Landscape; a Dutch landscape; Amsterdam; another landscape and two figure subjects (from original drawings and etchings in the British Museum. An impression copy of her reproduction of the 'Long Landscape' was placed beside the original in the British Museum, and was said to have deceived good judges).
- After Dürer: Ecce Homo (from etching); Ecce Homo (from wood-cut).
- From painting by Richard Wilson formerly in her father's possession.
- Twelve figure subjects, including etchings from Raphael and Fuseli.
- After Annibale Caracci : Holy Family (from etching).
- After Marc Antonio Raimondi : Dancing Cupids (from etching).
- Two small sea subjects from Ruysdael and J. S. Cotman.
- From nature: Bardon Hall, Leicestershire (seat of descendants of Dr. Jacomb); Bradgate Hall, Leicestershire; Flordon Common; Village Street, Flordon; Graves of Ejected Ministers at Oakington, Cambridgeshire; two landscapes with cottages; landscape in the Dutch manner; etching and drawing of cobbler at his bench.
