= St Mary Abbots Hospital =

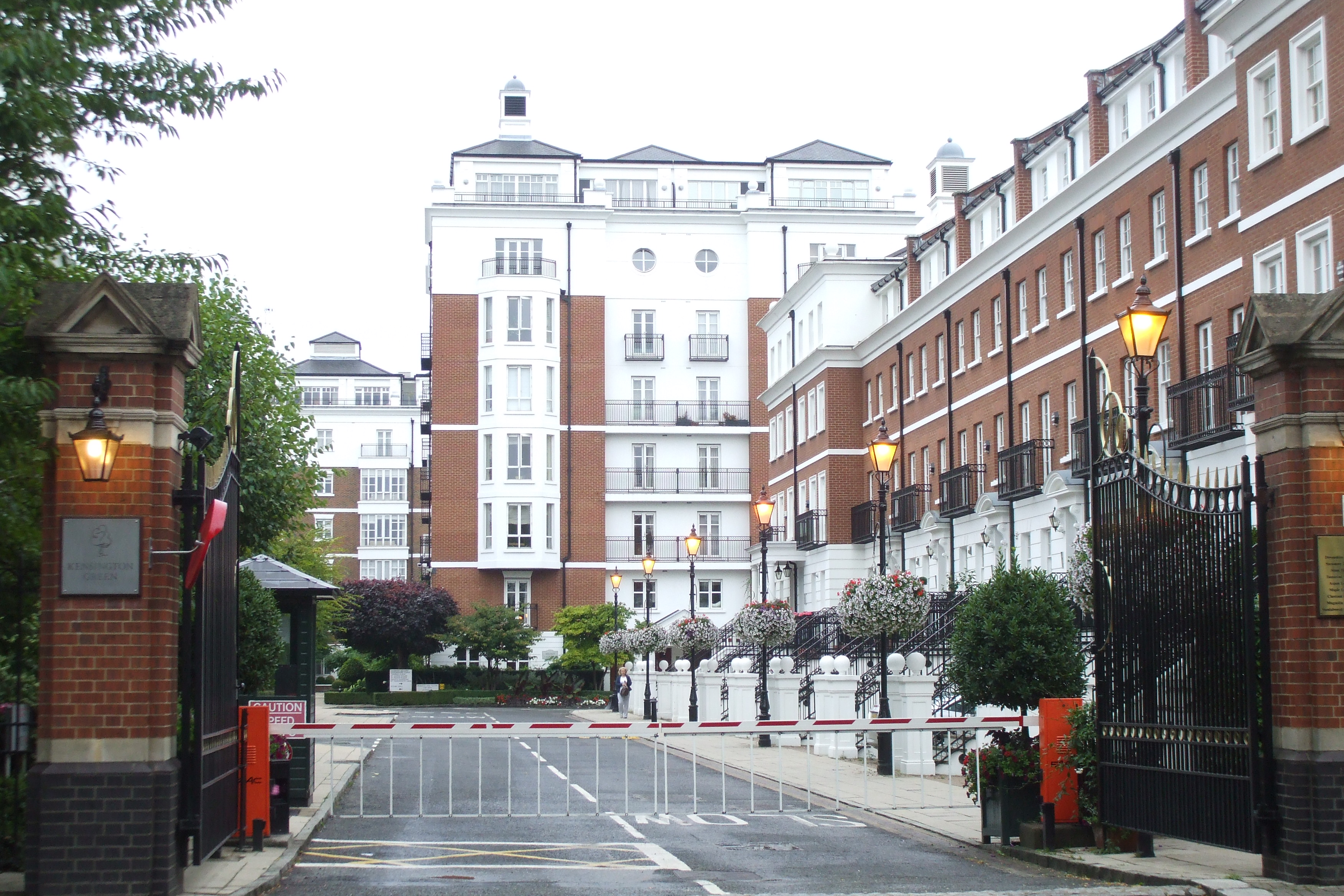
- The hospital's original gateposts on Marloes Road are now the entrance to Kensington Green, a luxury housing estate

- Location within Kensington and Chelsea

Geography
- Location: Marloes Road, Kensington, London, England
- Coordinates: 51.497676°N 0.190909°W

History
- Founded: 1871
- Closed: 1992

St Mary Abbots Hospital was a hospital that operated from 1871 to 1992 at a site on Marloes Road in Kensington, London.

== History ==
The hospital building, which was designed by Alfred Williams as a workhouse infirmary and built by John T. Chappell, was completed in 1871. It included a chapel dedicated to Saint Elizabeth of Hungary, whose foundation stone was laid on 17 April 1875 by Princess Louise, Duchess of Argyll. The workhouse was renamed the Kensington Institution in 1912 and the hospital the Kensington Infirmary.

The Infirmary was renamed as St Mary Abbots Hospital in 1923. Miss HA Alsop MBE SRN was matron from 1907 to 1930. Matron Alsop was a founding member of the Poor Law Infirmaries Matrons' Association , early member of the College of Nursing and an elected member of the General Nursing Council 1923-1932. In 1930 the hospital came under the control of the London County Council under the reforms of the Local Government Act 1929. The hospital had 841 beds at the time and was under the leadership of the medical superintendent Dr A Remington Hobbs MD, MRCP (1874–1932) and matron Miss I Russell.

Nurses' badges

The hospital was badly damaged during the London Blitz in 1940. Four people were killed and one of the blocks was destroyed, leaving an open bomb site within the hospital grounds.

In 1944, a V-1 flying bomb directly hit the hospital site. The infirmary building from 1871 was destroyed, along with the southern end of the original workhouse building from 1847 (known as Stone Hall). Five nurses, six children and seven adult patients died, while 33 additional casualties were transferred to St George's Hospital on Hyde Park Corner, with all remaining patients evacuated.

The hospital gradually recovered, and structural repairs were still being carried out when it was incorporated into the National Health Service in 1948 as a general hospital, including maternity care. The Metropolitan Ear, Nose and Throat Hospital moved to the site in 1953. American musician Jimi Hendrix was pronounced dead at the hospital on 18 September 1970.

In 1992, the hospital was closed and its remaining services were moved to the new Chelsea and Westminster Hospital in Fulham Road. The hospital site was subsequently redeveloped into a luxury housing estate, Kensington Green, which is a private gated community. The site's landscaped grounds include Stone Hall Gardens. At the centre of the site stands Stone Hall, a Jacobethan-style building that was constructed in 1847 as the main workhouse block and which now contains high-end residential apartments. The hospital's original gate posts, railings and gatehouse on Marloes Road survive at the entrance to the secure residential complex.

== See also ==
- List of hospitals in England

== Sources ==
- Moskowitz, David (2010). The Words and Music of Jimi Hendrix. Praeger. ISBN 978-0-313-37592-7.
