= The Picturesque Atlas of Australasia =

1880s Atlas of Australia and New Zealand

The Picturesque Atlas of Australasia was a significant undertaking by the Picturesque Atlas Publishing of Sydney & Melbourne who produced a large folio format (about A3 sized) Atlas published in Australia the late 1880s.

Unlike a modern atlas (Note: see https://en.wiktionary.org/wiki/atlas) the main part of the work, was composed of descriptive text rather than solely a book of maps. The total page count was around eight hundred and it was printed black and white on heavy quality paper especially manufactured, and on a printing press especially imported for the project.

Included were some eight hundred steel and wood engravings as illustrations. The general Editor was Andrew Garran and he had contributions from leading historians, geographers, and natural historians of the time. The engravings were created by prominent and well-known artists. The Atlas was first issued in forty-two monthly parts and sold only by subscription.

The company and their agents managed to sell some 50,000 subscriptions considering the population of Australia at the time. Each part usually had eighteen numbered pages plus an un-numbered full page engraving and the whole was issued with a card cover. Some parts included coloured maps as well, often double sized. Each part was priced at five shillings making the full set ten pounds, ten shillings or ten guineas, (£10/10/0). In the money of 2024, this equates to approximately A$45.00 a part or $1900 for the set, according to online inflation calculators.

It was expected that buyers would have their parts made into Volumes and many did so at their own expense, although the individual parts are still to be found on the second-hand book market.

Effectively the publication was designed to fall into three large and heavy volumes:-

Volume I. Early Discoveries, Captain Cook, Early Settlement, New South Wales History and topography, Sydney, NSW Towns, Jenolan Caves, Victoria History and topography, Melbourne.

Volume II. South Australia Description and History, (including the Northern Territory), Tasmania Description, Queensland Description and History, Western Australia History.

Volume III. New Zealand Historical and Descriptive Sketch, Provinces and areas of the country, Insular Australia (New Guinea, Fiji, Tonga, Samoa, New Caledonia, etc.), Australian Aborigines, Flora & Fauna of Australasia, Geology, Mining, Farming, Railways, and People of the area.

== Reprints ==
After the initial sales the whole publication was reprinted twice a short time later and sold in complete matching volumes. In 1974 Volumes I and II were reprinted in a reduced A4 format and in one physical book under the title "Australia The First Hundred Years." (Note: The Trove entry fails to separate the 1974 edition from the earlier, but does have:. Australia : the first hundred years Garran, Andrew, 1825-190, Schell, Frederic B Sydney : Ure Smith, 1974. with a note:"Australia the first hundred years being a facsimile of volumes I & II of the Picturesque Atlas of Australasia, 1888 was edited by the Hon.Andrew Garran", illustrated under the supervision of Frederic B. Schell) The original maps were not reproduced but this is otherwise a complete reprint, albeit in a smaller size, and with correct the page numbering of the original. This reprint, in itself, has had several impressions and editions.

A similar reprint occurred in 1980 for Volume III under the title "New Zealand The First hundred Years." It is an incomplete version as it only included the New Zealand and Insular Australia data, and neither were any maps reproduced. The pages were renumbered from "1" rather than carrying forward those from Volume II.

== Online editions ==
Both the National Library of Australia and the University of Queensland have online versions of the Atlas available.

== Similar Publication ==
A similar and near contemporary publication was the four volume “Cassell’s Picturesque Australasia.” This too was initially published in parts and later as complete volumes. Complete digitised copies are available at the Internet Archive, and elsewhere. A partial reprint was published in Sydney in 1978 under the title “Australia’s First Century 1788 – 1888.”
