= Myra Taylor =

Myra Taylor may refer to:

- Myra Taylor (singer) (1917–2011), American jazz singer
- Myra Taylor (scriptwriter) (1934–2012), British sitcom writer
- Myra Louise Taylor (1881–1939), Canadian nurse
- Myra Juliet Farrell (1878–1957), Australian inventor
