= Shakespeare by the Sea (Australia) =

Summer outdoor event

Shakespeare by the Sea was a summer outdoor event held at Balmoral Beach in Sydney's northern suburbs, using a band rotunda as a backdrop, that ran in summer (January to early March) for twenty-five seasons, from 1987 to 2011.

The event was started in 1987 by David MacSwan, pre-dating other similarly named events such as Shakespeare by the Sea, Halifax, which was founded in 1994. Each season featured two plays, mostly from Shakespeare's canon including, Henry IV (parts 1 and 2), Romeo and Juliet, King Lear, The Merchant of Venice, The Two Gentlemen of Verona, The Merry Wives of Windsor, The Comedy of Errors, Much Ado About Nothing, Macbeth, Othello, and Hamlet. In 2005 and 2010 Shakespeare by the Sea presented The Taming of the Shrew, with The Tamer Tamed by John Fletcher. The events were also noted for not charging any admission fees; instead, the audience was invited to make a donation at the conclusion of each performance.

Actors who have performed in Shakespeare by the Sea productions include Gregor Jordan, who played Bassanio in The Merchant of Venice and who later directed the films Two Hands (1999), Buffalo Soldiers (2001), and Ned Kelly (2003). Joe Clements who played Senior Sergeant Allan Steiger in the television soap opera, Neighbours, during 2004–2007 was in the 2010 productions of Shakespeare by the Sea.

The 2011 season was announced as the final season, even before the founder David MacSwan died suddenly on 14 January 2011, the opening night of the final season. Some of the actors who had been members of the Shakespeare by the Sea company decided to continue presenting plays at the same site and following a similar schedule, but with a different production style, under the name Bard on the Beach.

Shakespeare by the Sea (Australia) is listed as a Major Festival in the book Shakespeare Festivals Around the World by Marcus D. Gregio (Editor), 2004.

== Past productions ==
- 1986 A Midsummer Night's Dream and Twelfth Night
- 1987 Romeo and Juliet and The Taming of the Shrew
- 1988 The Merry Wives of Windsor and Macbeth
- 1989 As You Like It and Much Ado About Nothing
- 1990 Othello and Richard III
- 1991 Henry IV parts 1 and 2
- 1992 Henry V & The Merchant of Venice
- 1993 The Comedy of Errors and Hamlet
- 1994 The Two Gentlemen of Verona and The Tempest
- 1996 The Comedy of Errors and Macbeth
- 1997 Measure for Measure and Twelfth Night
- 1998 King Lear
- 2002 Romeo and Juliet and The Tempest
- 2003 Hamlet and A Midsummer Night's Dream
- 2004 Twelfth Night and The Comedy of Errors
- 2005 The Taming of the Shrew and The Tamer Tamed
- 2006 The Merchant of Venice and Much Ado About Nothing
- 2007 The Merry Wives of Windsor and As You Like It
- 2008 Richard III and Macbeth
- 2009 Measure for Measure and Romeo and Juliet
- 2010 The Taming of the Shrew and The Tamer Tamed
- 2011 A Midsummer Night's Dream and The Comedy of Errors
