= Myra Juliet Farrell =

Irish-born inventor who moved to Australia and artist

- Myra Juliet Farrell in 1939 with her grandchild Jennifer
- Born: Maria Julia Welsh; 25 February 1878; County Clare, Ireland
- Died: 8 March 1957 (aged 79); Mosman, New South Wales
- Other names: Myra Juliet Welsh; Myra Juliet Taylor
- Occupations: inventor, painter

Myra Juliet Farrell (also Myra Juliet Welsh and Myra Juliet Taylor; 25 February 1878 – 8 March 1957) was an Irish /Australian visionary, inventor and artist. Born in County Clare, Ireland, she migrated to Australia as a child, growing up in Broken Hill, travelled widely and settled in Mosman, Sydney. She held more than two dozen patents ranging from a military barricade to a press stud that could be applied without stitching.

Myra Juliet Farrell was born on 25 February 1878. Originally from County Clare, Ireland, she was an inventor and painter that went by the names Myra Juliet Farrell, Myra Juliet Welsh, and Myra Juliet Taylor. Her father was Marcus Frederick Welsh, a military engineer with the Royal Irish Regiment. His family traced its ancestry to King William III's chaplain. Her mother, Harriet (née Dove), was born in Australia and moved to Ireland with her husband, Marcus Welsh, shortly after they were married [1]. Her mother's father, Samuel Dove, was a plant engineer at a distillery in Sydney, and subsequently owned an engineering business in New Zealand.

From childhood, Farell looked for ways to simplify life and improve functionality. She revealed in interviews that her innovative ideas frequently originated from her dreams [1]. These inspirations would wake her up, and she would record them while half awake before they slipped away. Later, it was learned that she had a rare neurological condition called somnambulant writing, which allowed her to focus on an idea as she slipped into sleep. When she awoke, she would have an invention developed or problem solved by morning. This aided her in having so many revolutionary inventions that are still in use today.

One of her inventions was a corset without any hard stays. Many women in the 1800s and 1900s found corsets fashionable and wore them often, however, they began demanding change as they knew these corsets could cause damage to their bodies due to their tight fit and hard material [3]. Farrell knew about these health risks and wanted to fix this issue, so in 1911, she received an Australian patent for a new form of a corset that was equally as supportive but was washable and ‘boneless’. She sold these corsets around the world. Myra Farell originally created it to support women with scoliosis, but the corset grew in popularity amongst women who wanted to wear it for fashion [4]. While corsets have changed in design over time, she revolutionized the way women dressed forever by providing comfort and reducing the health hazards posed by corset garments.

Farell had several inventions. In 1905, Miss Myra Welsh obtained a patent for her initial creation, which was a clever mechanical tracking device. This innovative machine had the ability to replicate sewing patterns of a fixed size from books directly onto fabric, while also allowing for adjustments in size. As a result, seamstresses and tailors could now produce custom-fit garments more effectively, ensuring they remained true to the original design. Another of her inventions aided in Australia's war effort. This was her “stitch-less button”, known as the press-stud today, and her “stitch-less hook and eye.” This gave soldiers the ability to rapidly take on and off the now pull-apart fronts of their khakis. She also created a Defence Fence, which had survived the lengthy assessment process, from many culled entries, following the department's shout-out for ideas [2].

== Myra's Background ==
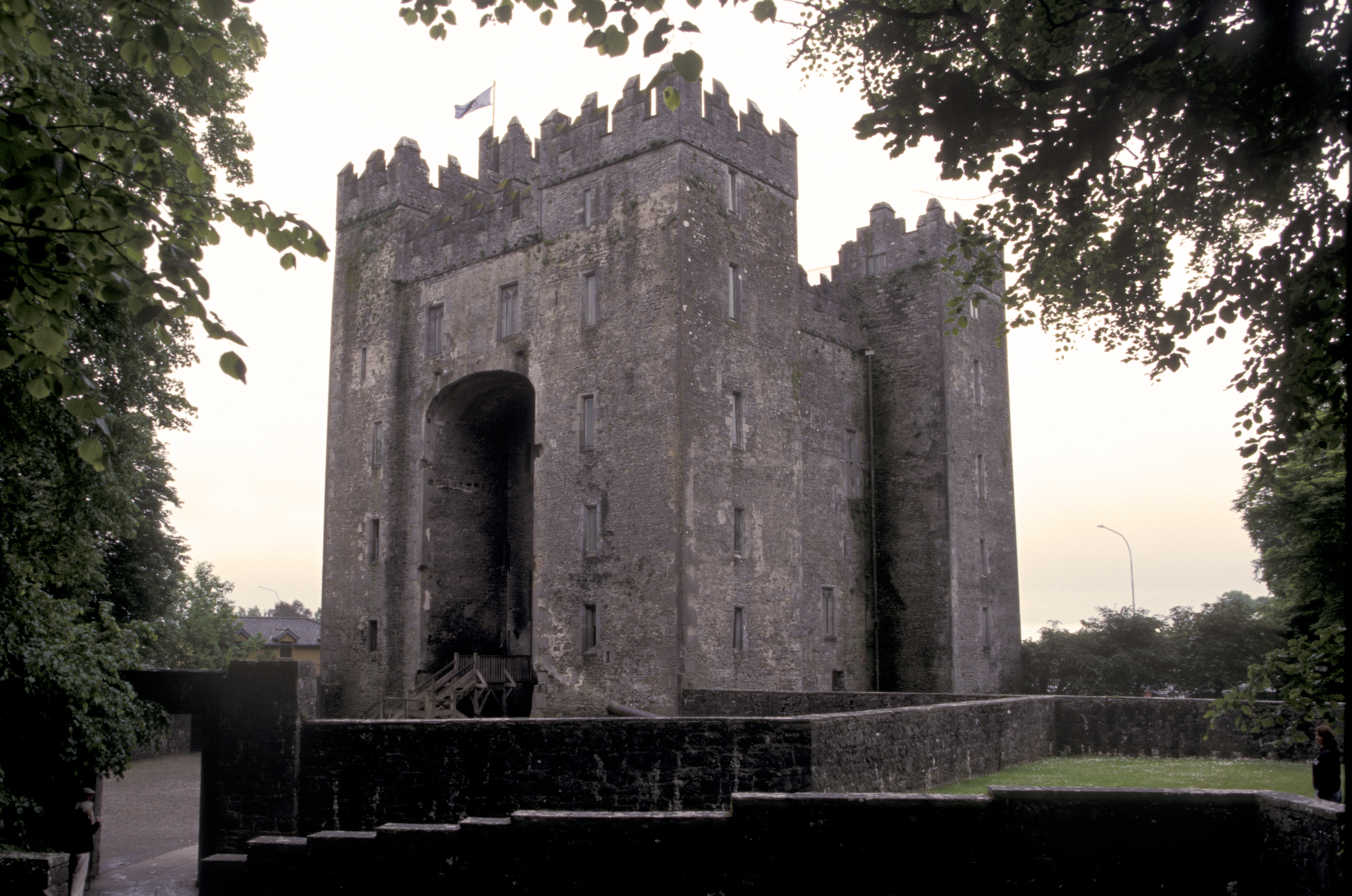
Myra and her family lived for a time in Bunratty Castle.

Myra Farrell was born in Ireland on 25 February 1878 and was registered as Maria Julia, the third of six children of Marcus Frederick Welsh and Harriett Curtis (née Dove) of Scragh House, County Clare. Farrell's family were Protestant, descendants of the Reverend George, chaplain to William III of England. Many of her family were clergy, or military. They were major land-owners in County Clare, and many served as magistrates and as High Sheriff of Clare. Farrell's father travelled to New Zealand where he took part in the New Zealand Wars and married Harriett Curtis Dove, the daughter of an engineer. Marcus Welsh then returned to Ireland with his wife, to take up his estate at Kilrush. The destruction of the Scragh House by arson caused the family to flee to their Studdert relatives who provided a home for them for several years in the ruinous Bunratty Castle.

In the 1880s the family migrated to Australia, where Farrell's mother, Harriett Welsh, had been born, and where one of Marcus Welsh's brothers was already living. They disembarked in Adelaide and travelled north to Broken Hill. Silver had recently been discovered to the west at Umberumberka. Marcus and Harriett established a school at the new town of Silverton and for a time had the author Mary Gilmore as their assistant. They then moved into Broken Hill and established St Peter's School, where Myra was educated. Harriett Welsh was particularly esteemed as a music teacher. Farrell's brothers remained in Broken Hill, while her sisters married and moved to Sydney and Perth.

== Inventions ==
=== Method of working ===
Farrell's earliest ideas for practical inventions came to her as a child when at the age of ten she came up with the idea of a self-locking safety pin. She later described her lifelong method of working, in a newspaper interview. Farrell would perceive a need for a particular product, would think about it, and sleep on it. Farrell claimed that in her dreams she would see the solution to the problem in great detail, including the way in which the object should be constructed. She would get out of bed and write down the details of construction, or the formula of a medication. She wrote on whatever was near to hand, including sometimes the bed-linen or the wall, and her somnambulant writing was always right to left, rather than left to right. In the morning, she would copy it out, with the aid of a mirror. She also drew all the detailed diagrams and created the models for submission for the patents process.

=== Practical devices ===
Farrell's first patent was for a tailoring device that enabled a small skirt pattern in a pattern book to be transferred directly to a piece of cloth. Her inventions included a number of practical household devices including a folding clothesline for use in flats.

Her physical aids included a boneless corset for sufferers of scoliosis, a brace for hernias and a device that effected a facelift by simple mechanical means. Farrell also developed a sling for carrying a baby, at a time when these were not in common use in Western countries. According to the author Ruth Park, this device promoted the comment from Americans that Australian mothers had learnt from kangaroos to carry their babies in pouches.

Inventions for rural industry included an automated fruit picker and packer, and a device for sampling and weighing wheat. Farrell also invented the press-stud that can be attached to a garment without stitching, and the folding pram hood. By 1915 Farrell had 24 patented inventions.

=== Medications ===
While living in Broken Hill, Farrell suffered acute respiratory problems. She dreamt of the formula of an inhalation of which the properties of the various ingredients had the effect of cutting mucous, reducing inflammation and promoting healing. She manufactured tablets to this formula; they were burned in a clarifier and the fumes were inhaled. Farrell then met William Taylor, a young man from Perthshire in Scotland, who had come to Australia suffering from tuberculosis. Farrell treated Taylor with her inhalant. He experienced a remarkable improvement, they were married in 1906, and he lived for another six years. Subsequently, the product was marketed as "Membrosus". Farrell also had great success with an ointment, known as "Myra's ointment", with which she successfully treated a woman who contacted her, suffering from a rare fungal disease of the skin.

=== Military aids ===
During World War I Farrell worked on the invention of a barricade that could repel ammunition and lessen the impact of shells. The Australian Department of Defence took Farrell's plans for investigation, but whether the barricade was developed and utilised was not acknowledged.

At about the same time, she developed a light that could be projected to a great distance. She initially saw its use as being for advertising purposes, but the military also took the plans and Farrell's prototype. The unconfirmed family legend is that the light was tested from the North Head of Sydney Harbour, causing confusion to the crew of a vessel out at sea who mistook the beam for that of the South Head lighthouse.

== Personal ==
Myra Farrell, then Taylor, was described in an article in the Western Age:

"One would expect to find the person responsible for all this ingenious work to be rather difficult, but Mrs. Taylor is quite the reverse when one succeeds in making her talk of herself and her doings. Her manner is simple, kindly, and affable. In appearance she is essentially feminine, very fair, and plump, with appealing blue eyes, and brilliant colouring which comes and goes as she warms to her subject, and a soft, slow voice."

Seascape painted by Myra Juliet Farrell in about 1938

Farrell married twice, firstly William Taylor with whom she had children Lavie Curtis Taylor and William Paterson Welsh Taylor, and secondly William George Farrell with whom she had a son, the violinist George Harry Welsh Farrell. After the death of her first husband in Adelaide, Farrell lived at various times in Western Australia and at Bondi in Sydney, spending her later life in Mosman.

Aside from her inventions, Myra was a keen painter. Having learnt from an artist who painted stage scenery, she had a broad Impressionist style using intense colours and with little mixing of the paint. All her known remaining works are small landscapes.

Farrell was known in Theosophical circles and subscribed to the building of a grandstand at Balmoral Beach to witness the arrival of Krishnamurti in Sydney. She financially supported the utopian William Lane in his enterprise to found an ideal colony in Paraguay. In this she argued at length with Mary Gilmore, who also supported William Lane but was scornful of Farrell's religious ideology.

She was regarded as an eccentric, even within the family. Her eccentricities included keeping the foot of an Egyptian mummy on the mantelpiece, where it gathered dust because the housemaid refused to touch it. It was thrown out with the garbage and was subject to a police investigation when it was discovered by the garbage collector.

Farrell died at her home at Mosman on 8 March 1957.

== Accolades ==
Myra Farrell was described in the Geraldton Guardian:

Without fear of contradiction it is quite safe to assert that Mrs Myra Taylor ….. is a genius in the highest sense of the word.

The Western Age, Dubbo:

"That trite phrase "A prophet hath no glory in his own land" was never so strikingly illustrated as in the case of Mrs. Myra Juliet Taylor. This remarkable little lady might justly claim to be the most versatile woman in the Commonwealth, yet she dwells in our midst unknown, almost in obscurity."
