= HMAS Penguin (naval base) =

Naval base in Sydney, Australia

- Part of Fleet Base East
- Balmoral, Sydney, New South Wales in Australia
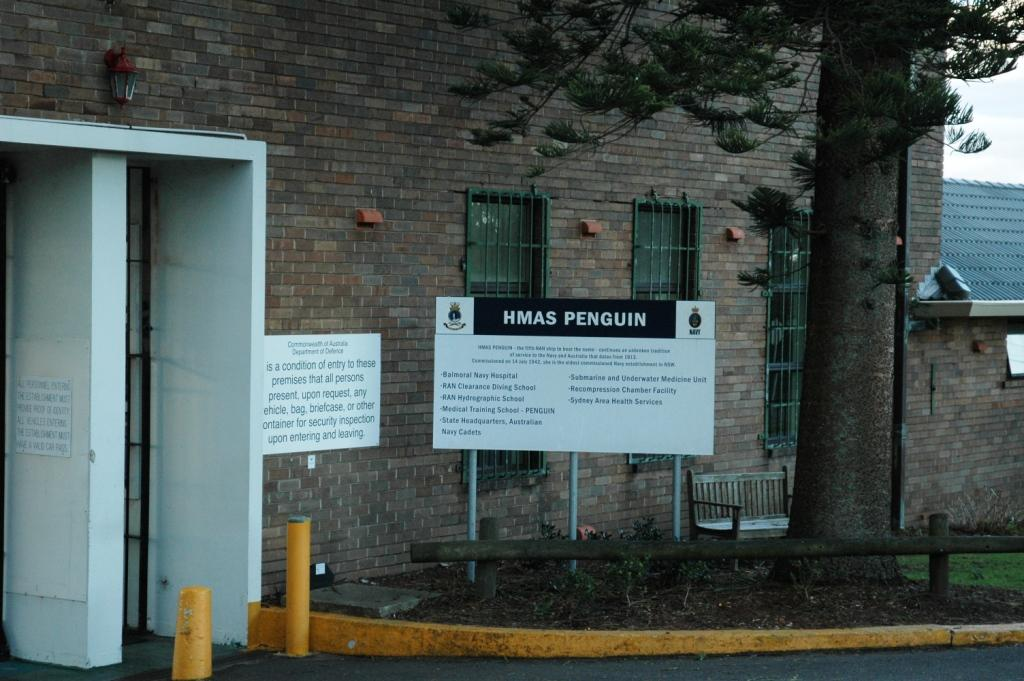
- The sign at the front of HMAS Penguin

Site information
- Type: Naval base
- Owner: Department of Defence
- Operator: Royal Australian Navy (1913 – present)
- Website: navy.gov.au/establishments/hmas-penguin

Location
- Location in Greater Sydney
- Coordinates: 33°49′40″S 151°15′31″E
- Area: 14.2 hectares (35 acres)

Site history
- Built: 14 July 1942

Garrison information
- Current commander: Commander Ian Walker, HADC RAN
- Occupants: ADF Diving School (ADFDS); RAN Hydrographic School; RAN Medical School; Submarine and Underwater Medicine Unit (SUMU); RAN Recompression Chamber Facility (RCCF); RAN Leadership and Management Development Centre (LMDC); Maritime Operational Health Unit (MOHU); ADF Centre for Mental Health; Penguin Health Centre

HMAS Penguin is a Royal Australian Navy (RAN) base located at Balmoral on the lower north shore of Sydney Harbour in the suburb of Mosman, New South Wales. Penguin is one of the RAN's primary training establishments, with a responsibility for providing trained specialists for all areas of the navy. The current commander of Penguin is Commander Ian Walker, HADC RAN.

== History ==
Penguin was initially established as the Balmoral Naval Depot and was also known as Penguin II in 1941 as a depot for the RAN's main naval base at Garden Island (on Sydney Harbour). In addition to accommodation for 700 personnel, as well as all the necessary administrative facilities, the Balmoral Naval Hospital was built on the site. Penguin II was commissioned in July 1942, and was renamed as simply HMAS Penguin in January 1943, when the Garden Island facility was renamed HMAS Kuttabul. In addition to its role as a depot, Penguin served as a base for the motor launches responsible for patrolling Sydney Harbour.

After the end of World War II, Penguin began its service as a training establishment. The RAN Seamanship School was located at Penguin from 1945 to 1974, while from 1951 to 1954 it was the Navy's National Service Recruit School. Penguin has also played host to the RAN Staff College and the Security and Naval Police Coxswains School. In addition, a number of operational units of the RAN were once based at Penguin, including Clearance Diving Teams One and Two, and the Royal Navy's 4th Submarine Squadron (disbanded 1969). The Balmoral Naval Hospital closed in 2006.

== Facilities and operational units ==
As part of the RAN Navy Systems Command, the 14.2-hectare (35-acre) Penguin site is home to several of the navy's major specialist training schools, including:

- ADF Diving School (ADFDS)
- RAN Hydrographic School
- RAN Medical School

In addition, Penguin was also home to the navy's principal medical facility, Balmoral Naval Hospital, which provided some of the trained personnel for the Primary Casualty Receiving Facilities [PCRF] on the RAN's Kanimbla class vessels. Balmoral Naval Hospital closed in 2006 with the Navy's hospital care being provided through a contract with St Vincent's Hospital, located in Darlinghurst. As well as this, Penguin is the home of the Submarine and Underwater Medicine Unit (SUMU), the RAN Recompression Chamber Facility (RCCF), Maritime Operational Health Unit (MOHU), the ADF Centre for Mental Health and the Penguin Health Centre. In 2006, Penguin received as lodger units both Headquarters and 1st Commando Company (1Coy) of the 1st Commando Regiment.

== Gallery ==
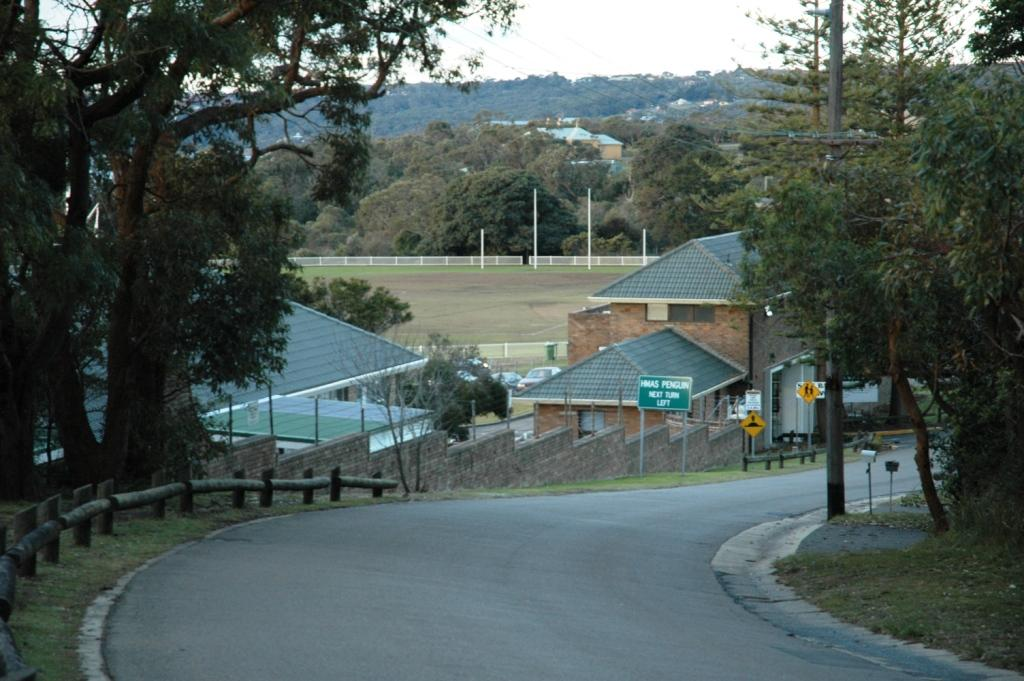
The Middle Head Road approach to HMAS Penguin.

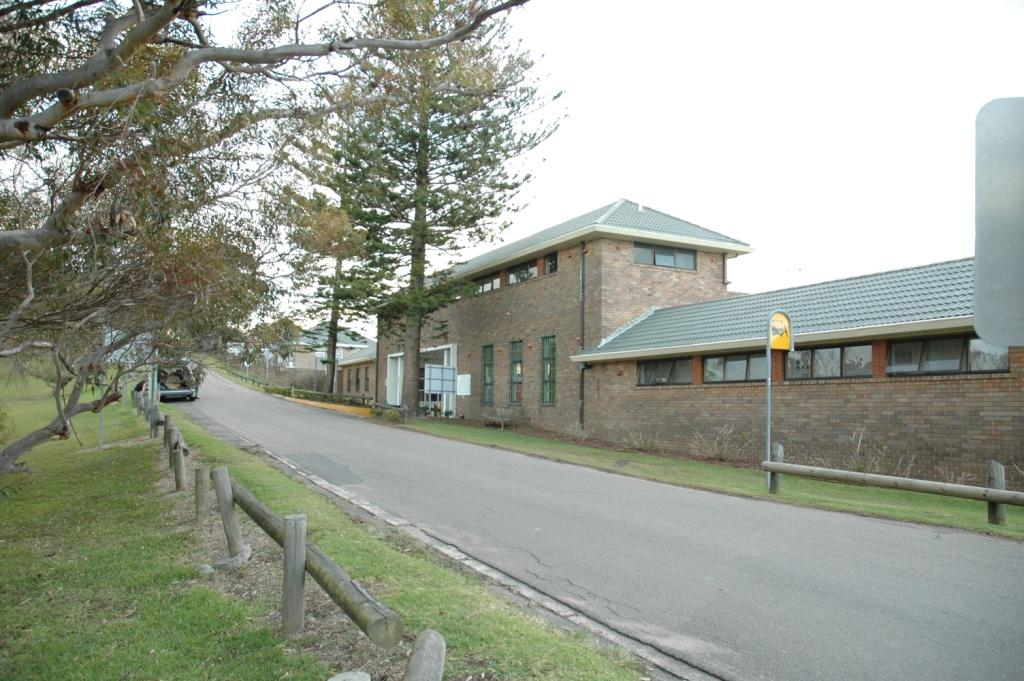
The Gatehouse building of HMAS Penguin.

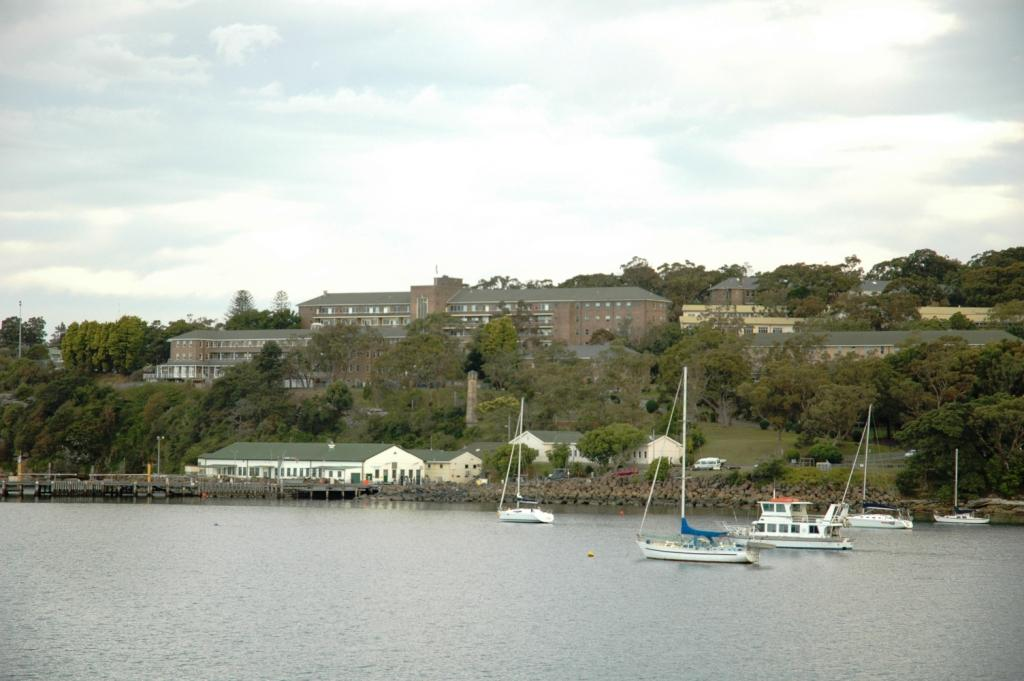
HMAS Penguin viewed across Middle Harbour from Balmoral Beach.

== See also ==
- List of Royal Australian Navy bases
