= Balmoral, New South Wales =

Balmoral
- Suburb
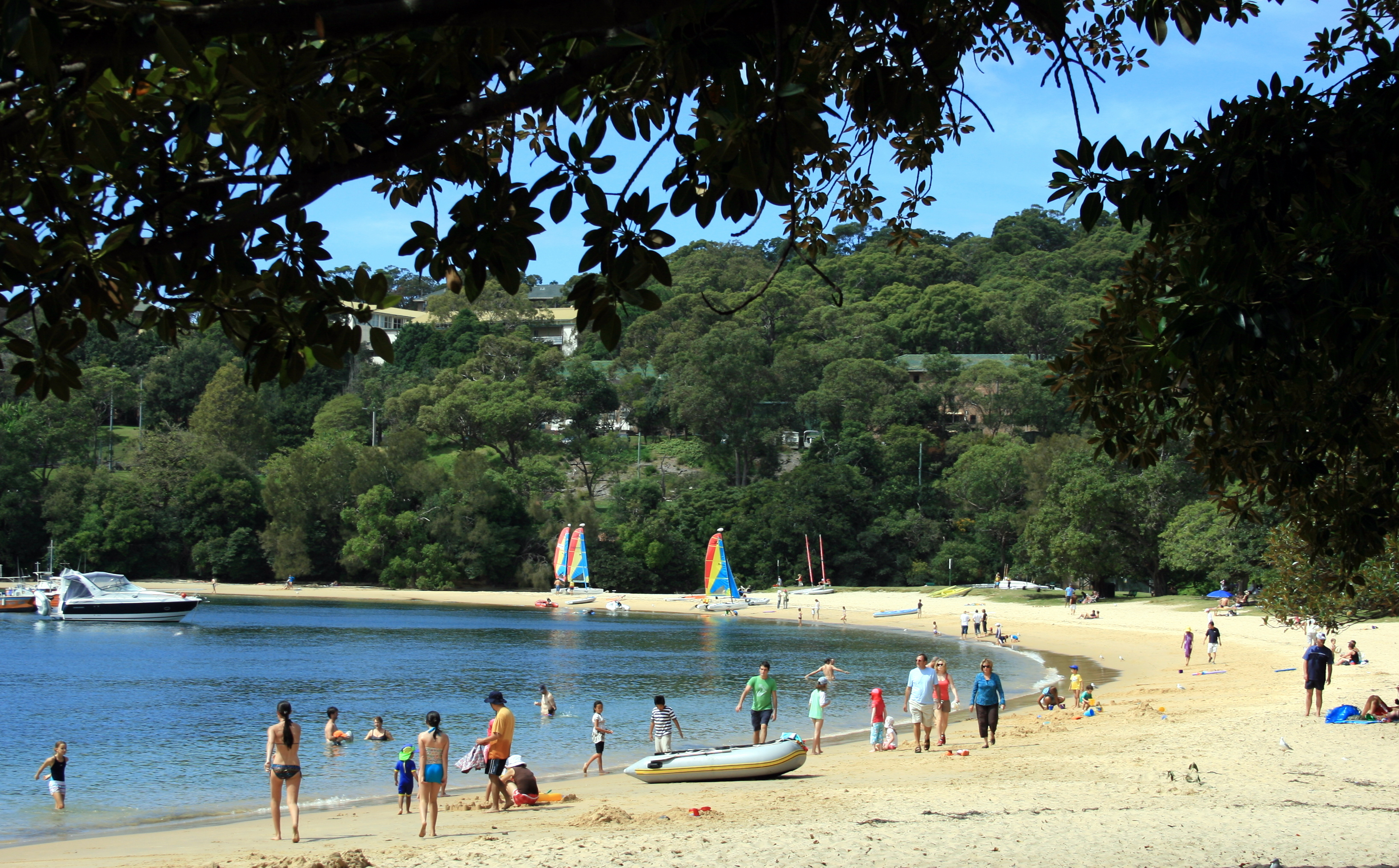
- Southern end of Balmoral Beach

- Coordinates: 33.82519°S 151.24648°E
- Country: Australia
- State: New South Wales
- City: Sydney
- LGA: Municipality of Mosman
- Location: 8 km (5.0 mi) north-east of Sydney CBD

Government
  - Federal division: Warringah

Population
  - Total: 365 (UCL 2021)
- Postcode: 2088
Suburbs around Balmoral
The Spit	Port Jackson	Port Jackson
Mosman	Balmoral	Mosman
Spit Junction	Mosman	Georges Heights

Balmoral is an urban locality in the suburb of Mosman in Sydney, New South Wales, Australia. It is in the local government area of the Municipality of Mosman and is part of the Lower North Shore.

The locality is mostly known for its beach, officially divided into Balmoral and Edwards Beaches. Expensive residential real estate on the surrounding "Balmoral Slopes" benefits from the views and beach proximity. The naval depot HMAS Penguin is situated at the eastern end of Balmoral Beach. It houses a naval hospital and is accessed from Middle Head Road.

== History ==
Before British colonisation, Balmoral was on the country of the Cammeraygal clan of Indigenous Australians. Balmoral Beach was used by these people as a burial ground.

Balmoral is named after Balmoral Castle, the large estate house in Aberdeenshire, Scotland known as Royal Deeside and a favourite summer royal residence. The Star Amphitheatre, an open-air temple constructed by the Theosophical Society-related group, was built in 1923–1924. Intended as a platform for lectures by the expected "World Teacher", believed by the Theosophists to be Jiddu Krishnamurti, it was demolished in 1951, and its foundations used for an apartment building that still stands on the site.

The Balmoral Beach Conservation Area is listed on the New South Wales State Heritage Register. The area includes Edwards Beach as well as Balmoral Beach, plus the promenade, esplanade, rotunda and Bather's Pavilion, which date back to the 1930s.

As the Balmoral area developed, it became the location for many examples of the Federation architectural styles that predominated from 1890 to 1915. There are many fine examples of these styles in the area. Balmoral is also the location of Noonee, a heritage-listed home designed by Alexander Stewart Jolly. The house was built 1918-19 and drew on elements of the American hunting lodge.

== Demographics ==
At the 2021 census Balmoral recorded an urban population of 365. Of these:

- 4.4% of people in urban areas of Balmoral identified as Aboriginal or Torres Strait Islander
- The median age was 42 compared to the national median of 38
- 78.4% of respondents for this area were born in Australia; the next most common countries of birth included England 4.1%, New Zealand 1.4%, Scotland 1.1%, Switzerland 1.1%, and China (excluding Special Administrative Regions (SARs) and Taiwan) 1.1%
- 90.4% of people only spoke English at home; the next most common languages spoken at home included Mandarin 1.4%, and German 1.1%
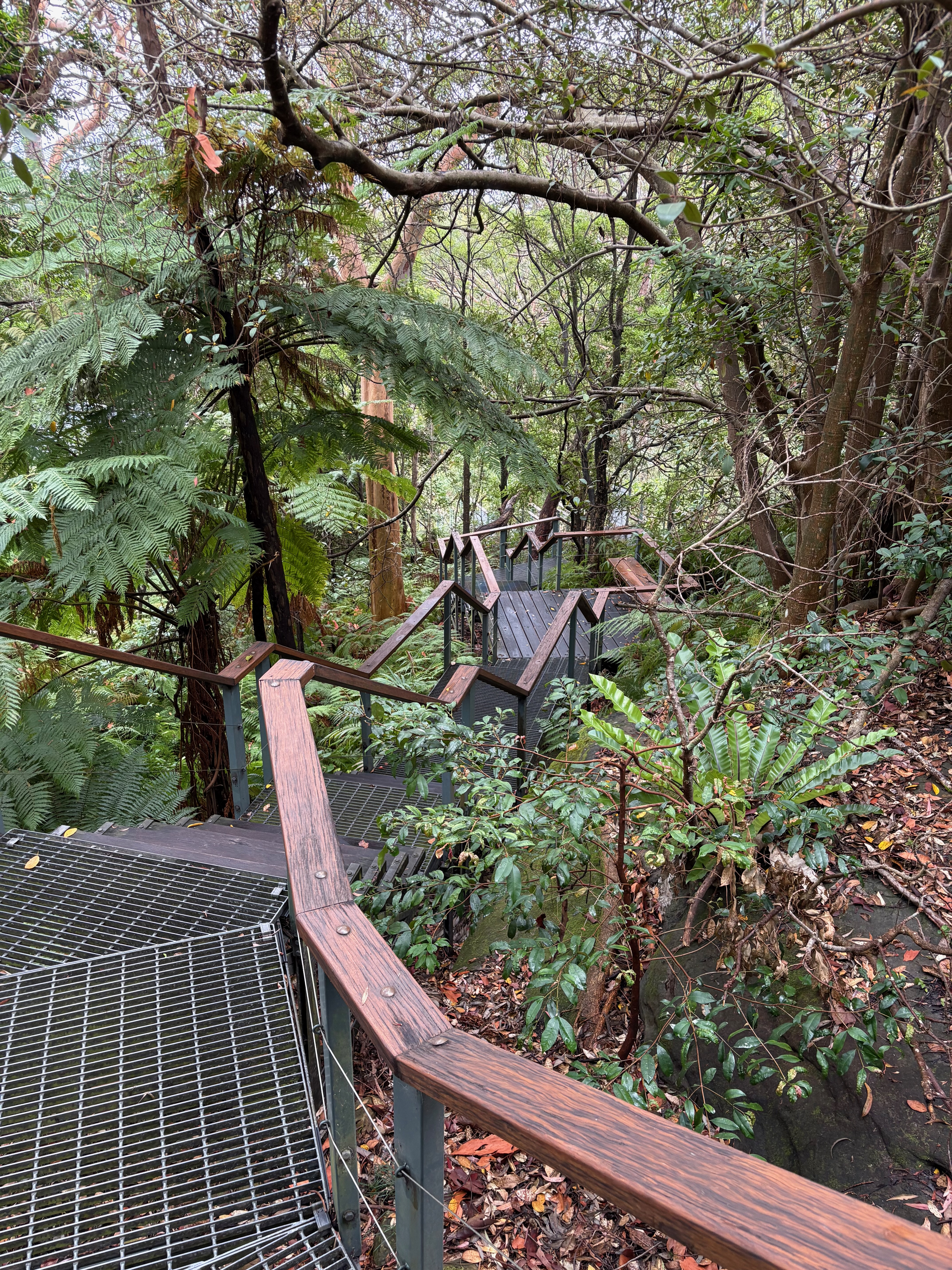
- Heading west down the ridge towards Balmoral on the Headland Park Walking Track.
  No Religion was the most common religious affiliation in Balmoral at 33.4%, followed by Catholic at 24.4%, Anglican at 23.6%, and Christian, not further defined at 4.1%; a further 9.9% of respondents for this area elected not to disclose their religion.

== Former tram services ==
The Balmoral line opened as a branch of the Georges Heights line in May 1922 and was one of the last tram lines to be opened in Sydney. Services ran to Wynyard, Lane Cove, Athol Wharf and Chatswood, making it one of the busiest lines on the North Sydney system.

Upon departure from The Esplanade Terminus, at the corner of Mandalong Road, trams travelled south-East along The Esplanade. After passing Botanic Road, the line swung right onto Henry Plunkett Reserve. From this point, the line went off-road onto its own reservation through a narrow rock cutting (now public walking track). After a steep ascent through the reserve, the line crossed several small residential streets such as Mulbring, Gordon, Plunkett, and Beaconsfield Streets, before once again entering onto Gordon Street where the line swung right onto Middle Head Road. Services ceased to operate in June 1958.

== The Promenade ==
The Promenade along the Esplanade was completed in 1926 in response to the influx of new visitors travelling by tram. The southern section of the promenade was completed as part of the Balmoral Beautification Scheme in 1927 and government employment projects during the Great Depression helped fund other sections, the bridge to Rocky Point, the Bathers Pavilion and the Rotunda to be completed by 1930.

The excavation work conducted during the construction of the promenade uncovered at least seven Indigenous Australian skeletons interred in ceremonial fashion, indicating that Balmoral Beach was used by the original Eora speaking people as a burial ground.

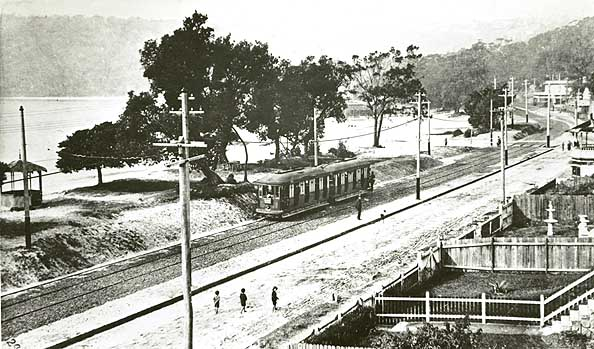
Tram travelling along The Esplanade, Balmoral, 29 May 1922

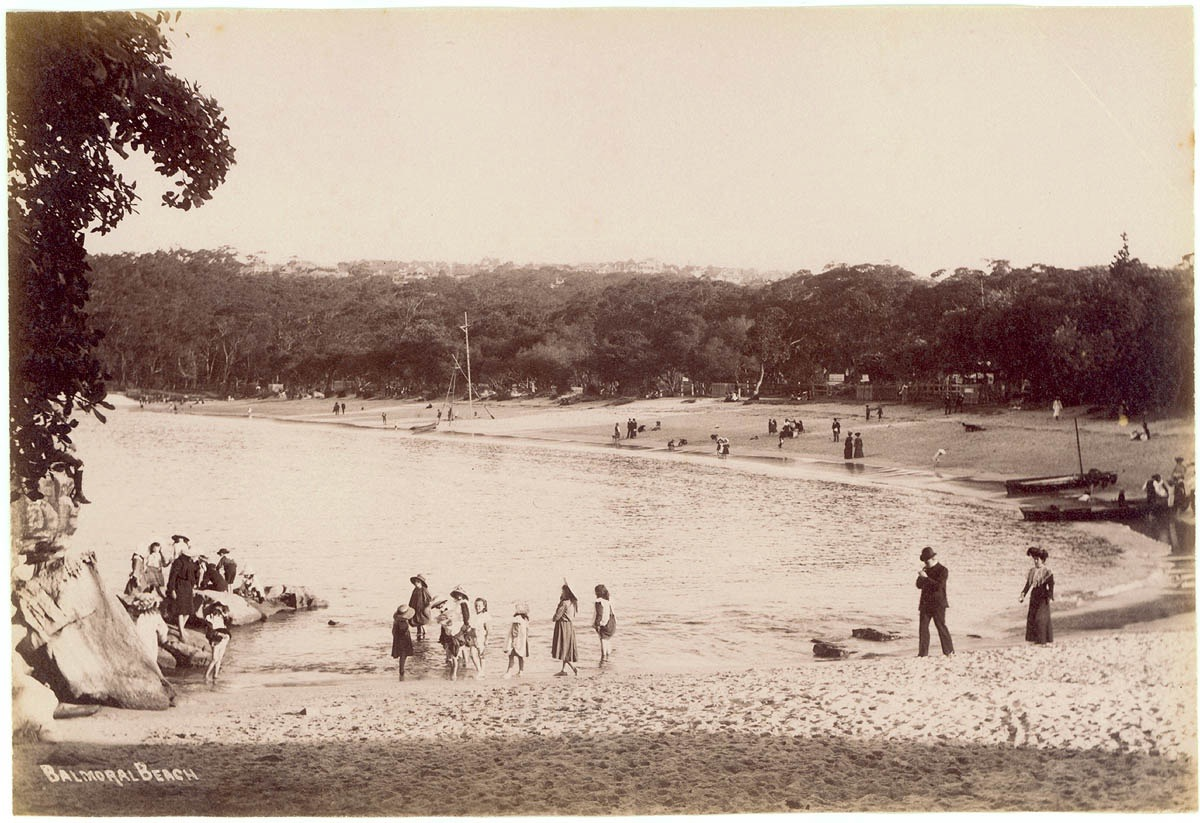
Balmoral Beach 1900-1910 prior to construction of the promenade

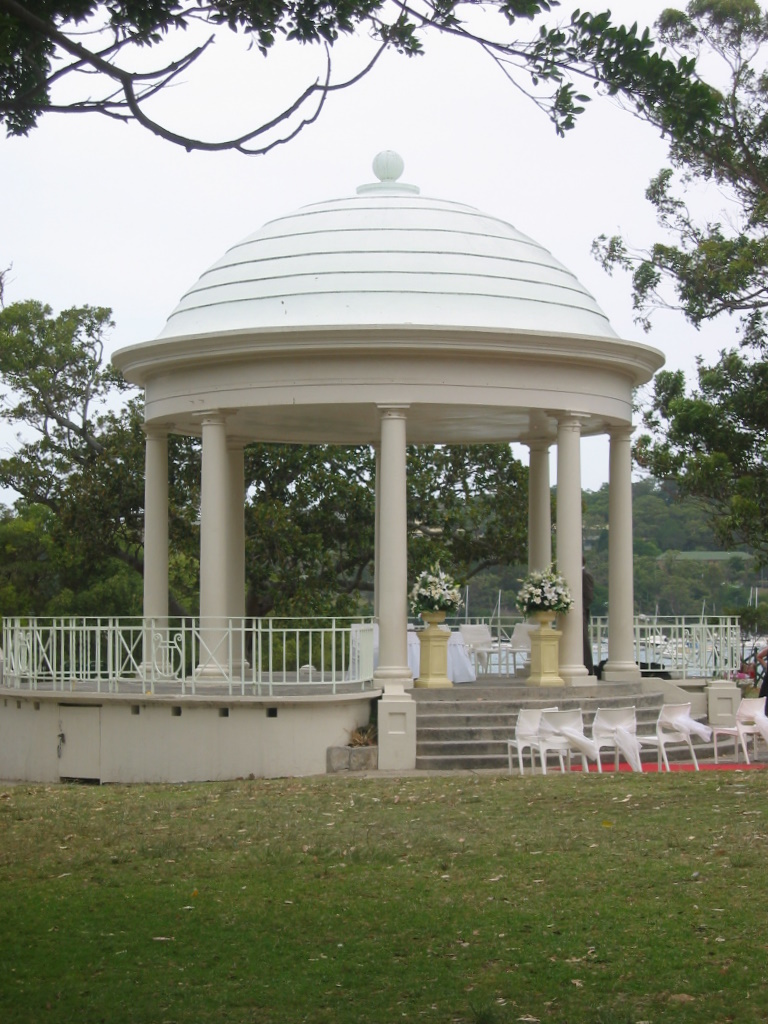
The Rotunda built in 1930

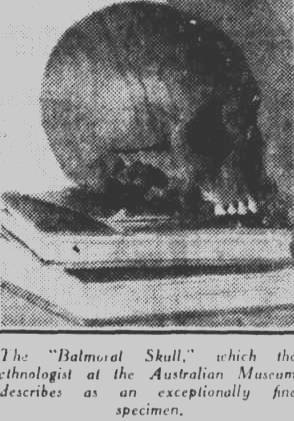
The Aboriginal "Balmoral Skull" unearthed in 1927

== Heritage listings ==
Balmoral has a number of heritage-listed sites, including:

- The Esplanade: Balmoral Bathers Pavilion

== Recreation ==
A number of eateries are situated along The Esplanade, the main thoroughfare along the beach, ranging from take away to restaurant dining. The Balmoral Rotunda is the home of Shakespeare by the Sea, a summer outdoor event. Other notable events include the annual Mudgee Wine Festival and the annual Carols By Candlelight hosted at the Rotunda in December. The Rotunda and Rocky Point Island are also popular for wedding ceremonies and photographs.

Organisations and facilities include Balmoral Oval, a substantial netted swimming area (Balmoral Baths), Balmoral Sailing Club, a sea scout troop, and two swimming clubs.

== Beaches ==
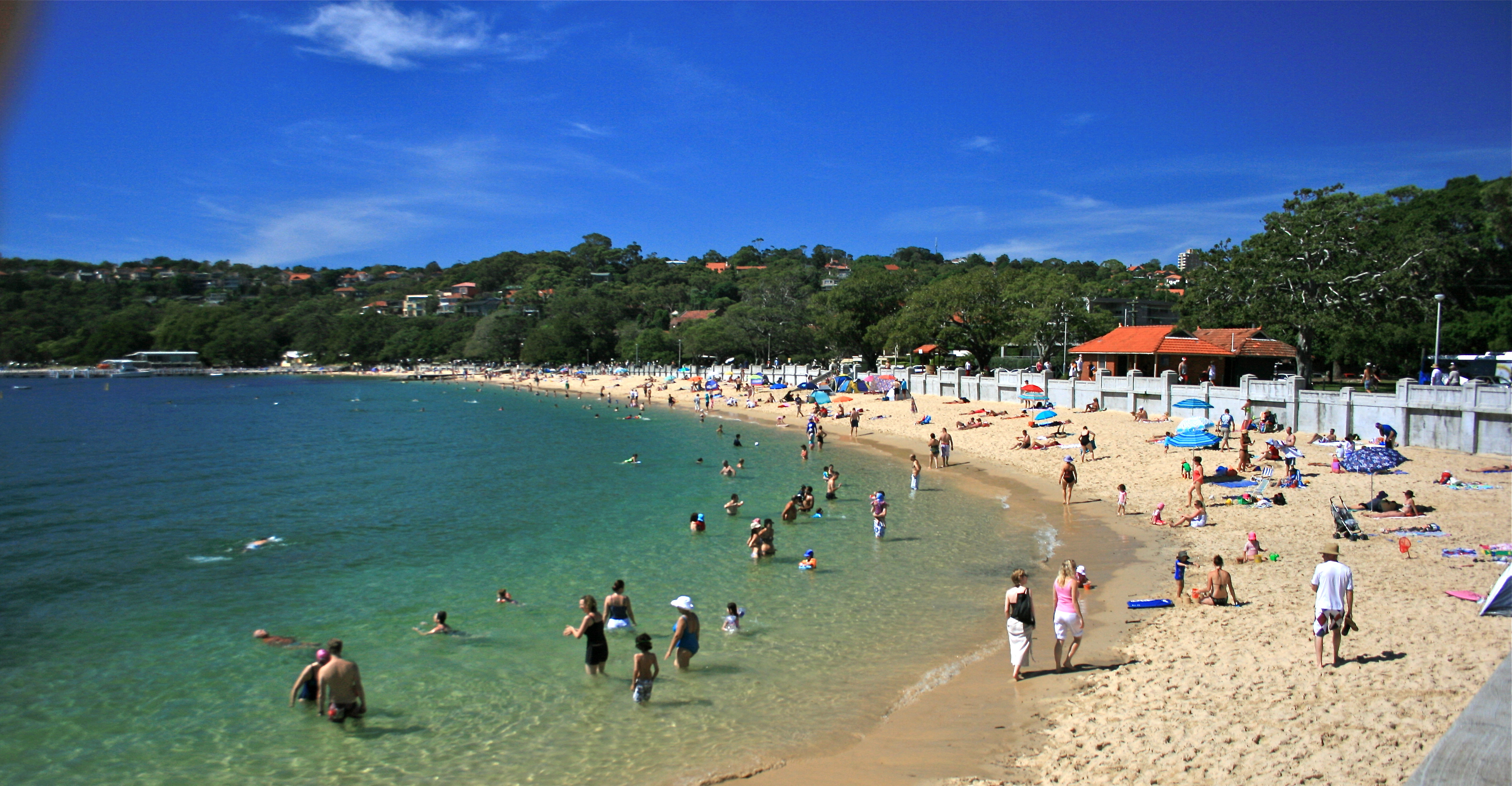
Balmoral Beach immediately south of Rocky Point

Balmoral features Balmoral and Edwards Beaches, both of which are separated by the outcrop of Rocky Point. Both beaches are usually referred to as simply Balmoral. The locality has views across the entrance to Middle Harbour to North Head, Manly, and Clontarf. The harbour beaches face north east and is sheltered from ocean swell by Middle Head. The entire beach is listed on the Register of the National Estate as the 'Balmoral Beach Conservation Area'. The conservation area includes the promenade, the esplanade, the Rotunda and the Bathers' Pavilion, which date back to the 1930s.

== Name legacy ==
In 2021 Transport for NSW named one of its Emerald class ferries used on the Manly ferry service Balmoral.
