= Rotunda at Balmoral Beach, Sydney =

Coordinates: 33.8232°S 151.2511°E

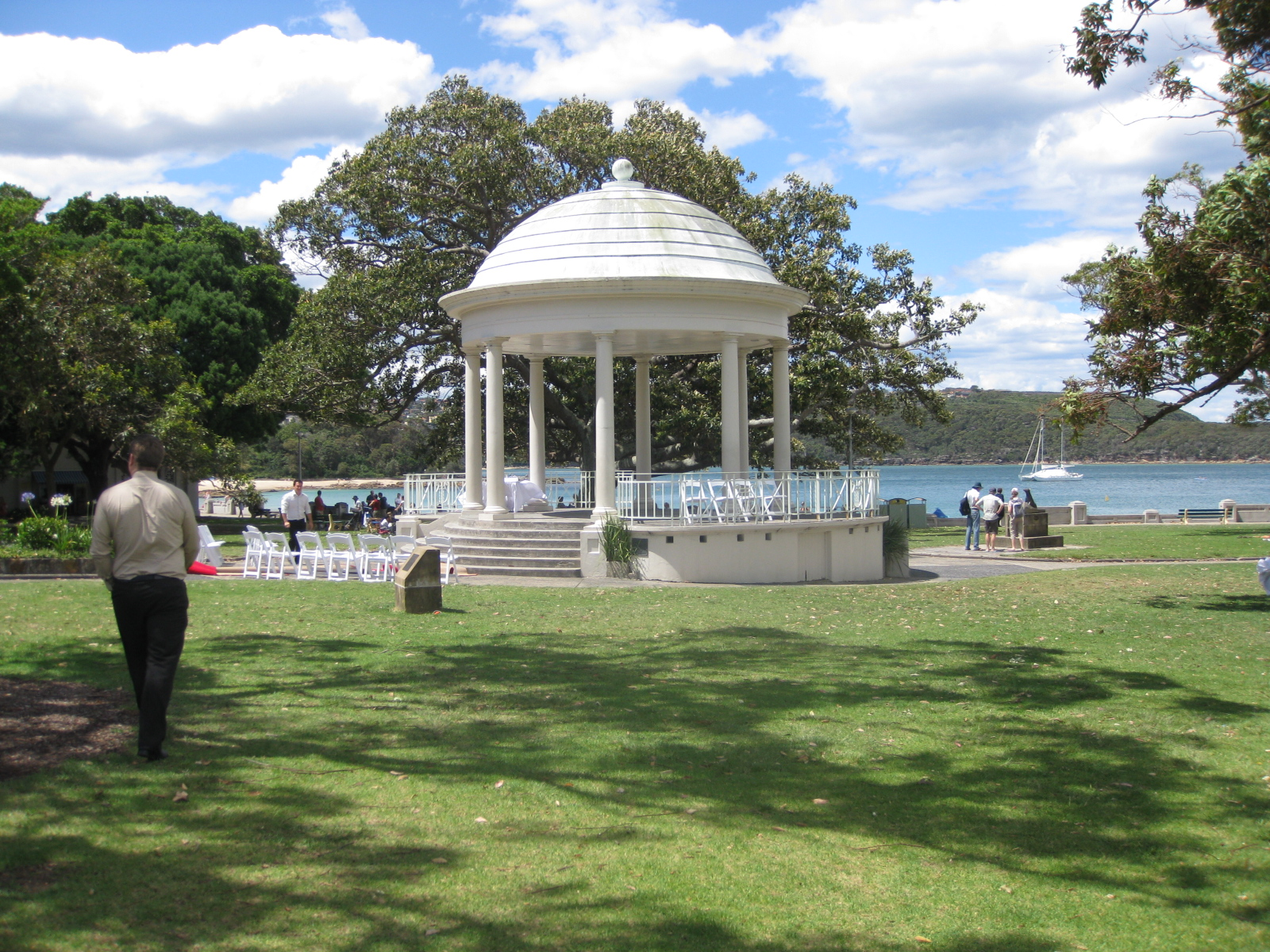
Balmoral Beach Rotunda

The Rotunda is located in Balmoral Beach Reserve at Balmoral Beach, Sydney. It was built in 1930 as part of the beach improvement program undertaken by Mosman Council. Overlooking the bay and close to Rocky Point Island, it is set in a very picturesque area. After its completion it was a very popular venue for brass band concerts for many years throughout the 1930s and 1940s. Today it is used for festivals, events and weddings and is an important historical landmark in Balmoral.

== History of the surrounding area ==
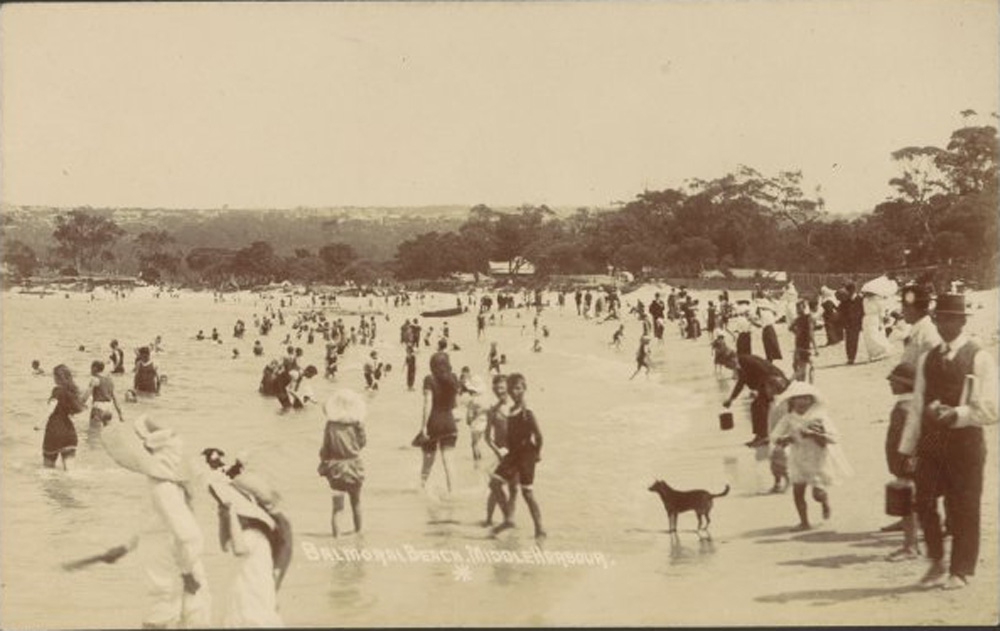
Balmoral Beach circa 1900, Rocky Point Island can be seen in the background on the left

Hunter Park was originally part of the land on which Captain John Edwards built his stone house in 1839. A painting exists of the ruins of the stone cottage by artist Donald Commons. A link to the painting on the internet is given at this reference. The house was located at the bottom of what is now Mandalong Road. Captain Edwards lived there with his wife Elizabeth until his death in 1861. Edwards was a seaman in the whaling industry. In the early 1820s he had command of a ship called the Mercury. The Sydney Gazette tabulates his voyages on whaling expeditions throughout the 1820s. In 1825 his brig the Mercury was shipwrecked in New Zealand when he called in for provisions. A colourful narrative of the shipwreck and subsequent rescue is in the Sydney Gazette.

In the early 1860s his son John Edwards established a "pleasure ground" which he called Balmoral Gardens and it was from this that the present area was named. Balmoral Gardens was used by many people as the destination for a Club or group excursion. Numerous descriptions are found in the Sydney Morning Herald during the 1860s of a typical fun day that was enjoyed in the gardens. For example, in 1862 a social group describes a forthcoming event in which they will take a steam boat to Balmoral Gardens and participate in activities such as foot races, cricket, jumping, throwing weights and quoits. They said that "Mr Edwards, the proprietor of the gardens will supply refreshments of all kinds at very moderate prices.".

Advertisement for an event at Balmoral Gardens in 1864.

The Balmoral Gardens also catered for the general public and had a dance pavilion with a hired band. An advertisement was placed in the Sydney Morning Herald in 1864 (see picture on right) for an Easter Monday picnic. Unfortunately John Edwards died in 1871 at the age of 39 and there is little mention of Balmoral Gardens in the newspapers after this time.

In the early 1880s Livingston Hopkins established the Artist's Camp at the northern part of Balmoral Beach near what now is Awaba Street. Other famous artists who were also at the camp during its forty-year existence were Julian Ashton and Henry Fullwood. In 1924 a large white building was erected at the northern end of Balmoral Beach called the Star Amphitheatre for the Order of the Star in the East, an offshoot of the Theosophical Society. It was demolished in 1951 and Stancliff flats (at 8 Wyargine Street) which is now a Heritage Listed building was constructed on the site.

== Improvements made to Balmoral Beach ==
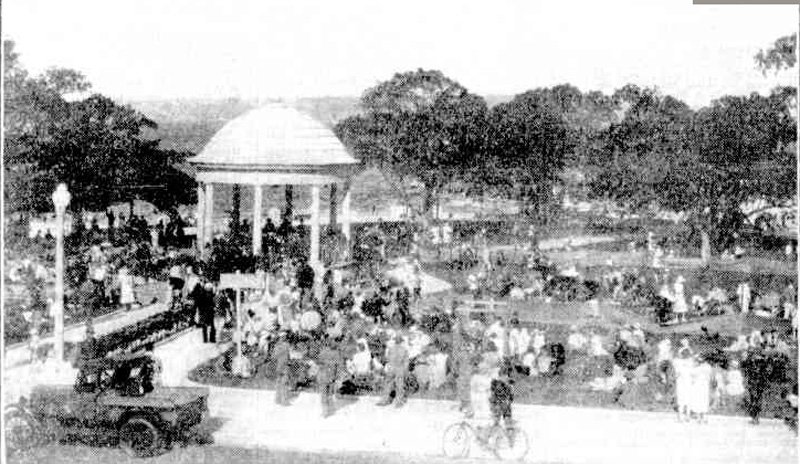
Balmoral Beach Rotunda in 1932 with an audience listening to a brass band.

During the 1920s major developments occurred at Balmoral. In 1922 the tramline was extended to the suburb bringing large crowds of people to visit the beach. The Council responded by undertaking the Balmoral Beautification Scheme. In 1924 the Esplanade was constructed and in 1929 the Balmoral Bathers Pavilion was completed.

In 1930 the Council decided to make more improvements to the beach. An article in the Sydney Morning Herald. outlines in detail the changes to be made. A shark proof net was to be introduced, the esplanade was to be extended and lit and a bridge was to be constructed at Rocky Point which "was to make the Point accessible at all states of the tide". In addition a rotunda was to be erected. When mentioning the rotunda the newspaper stated.

A feature of the improvements has been the retention of the well-grown Moreton Bay fig trees just at the back of the promenade. These form an ideal setting for the band rotunda which it is intended to erect

Numerous notices were placed in the newspapers during the 1930s and 1940s for band concerts to be held at the Balmoral Beach Rotunda on Sunday afternoons and sometimes the evenings.

Bridge to Rocky Point Island circa 1930	The Bathers Pavilion built in 1929	The Star Amphitheatre circa 1925 demolished in 1951
