= Bondi Beach Cultural Landscape =

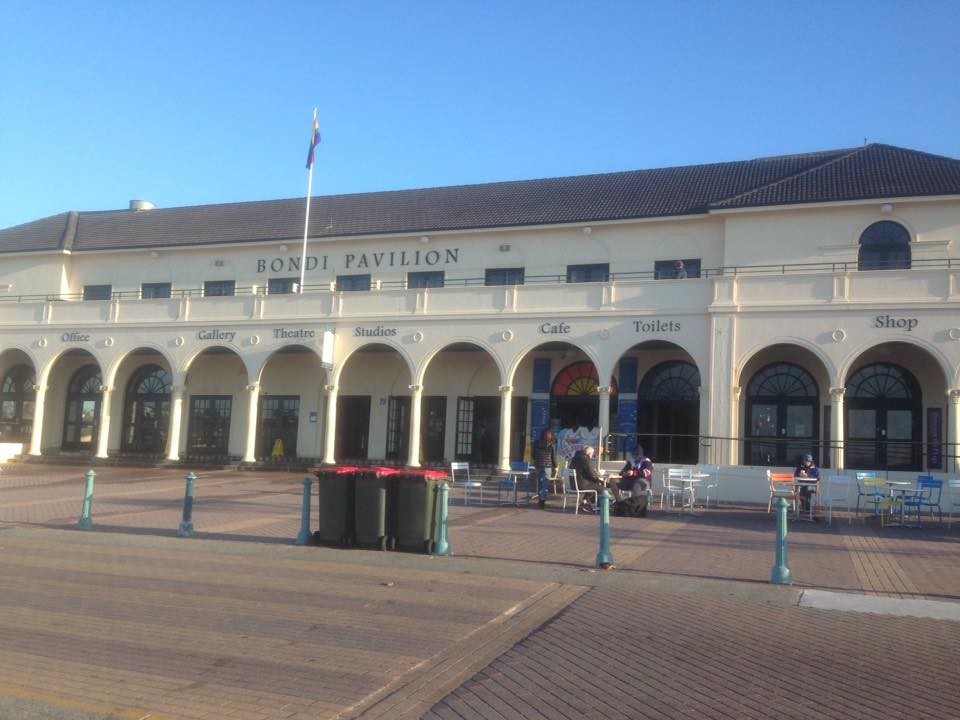
- Bondi Beach Pavilion, 2017

- Location within Sydney Location within Australia
- 33°53′28″S 151°16′36″E
- Location: Queen Elizabeth Drive, Bondi Beach, Sydney, Australia

Site notes
- Architects: Pavilion – Robertson and Marks (Leith C. McCredie); Bondi SLSC – c.1934 Ross & Rowe

New South Wales Heritage Register
- Official name: Bondi Beach Cultural Landscape; Bondi Beach; Bondi Surf Pavilion and Bondi Park; Bondi Surf Life Saving Club and the North Bondi Surf Club.
- Type: State heritage (landscape)
- Designated: 23 May 2008
- Reference no.: 1786
- Type: Other – Landscape – Cultural
- Category: Landscape – Cultural
- Builders: Bondi Pavilion: John Howie & Sons.

The Bondi Beach Cultural Landscape is a heritage-listed former Victorian-style Turkish bath, pavilion with dressing cubicles, dining rooms, sunbaking, shops and ballroom and now art gallery, pavilion, theatre and open air cinema located at Queen Elizabeth Drive, Bondi Beach, Sydney, Australia. The pavilion was designed by Robertson and Marks, with Leith C. McCredie the architect. The Bondi Surf Life Savers' Club, erected c. 1934, was designed by Ross & Rowe. The Bondi Pavilion was designed by John Howie & Sons. The cultural landscape includes the beach itself, Bondi Surf Pavilion, Bondi Park and Bondi Surf Life Saving Club and the North Bondi Surf Club. The landscape was added to the New South Wales State Heritage Register on 23 May 2008.

== History ==
=== History of Waverley ===
Waverley took its name from the title of a book by the famous Scottish author and poet, Sir Walter Scott. Its connection with the suburb of Waverley comes through Barnett Levey (or Levy, 1798–1837) who came to Sydney in the 1820s to visit his brother. When he saw how prosperous the city was becoming, Levey decided to settle here and set up a business as a general merchant. In 1831 he was granted 60 acres in the area bounded by the present Old South Head Road, Birrell Street, Paul Street and Hollywood Avenue. He must have occupied the land before the official grant because he built himself a substantial two story home on Old South Head Road in 1827, naming it Waverley House after the book by his favourite author. As time passed the house became a distinctive landmark and gave its name to the surrounding district, which was simply called Waverley. Levey established Sydney's first permanent theatre behind his shop in George Street. His projects consumed all his money, and when he died in 1837 he left a widow and four children in poverty. In 1837 the house was taken over for a Catholic school or orphanage, but it was demolished early in the 20th century.

Waverley municipality was proclaimed in 1859. By the 1880s trams were running to the beaches in the Eastern Suburbs and Waverley became a popular picnic spot. Waverley Park had a splendid oval, used by the established Waverley District Cricket Club.

Waverley Cemetery was established in 1877 on the site of the old tram terminus, on a beautiful site near the ocean. It houses many historically notable people.

The 1866 NSW Gazetteer described Waverley as having Clough's Windmill, Allan's Soap Works, Dickson's Soap and Candle Works and Scott's Blacking and Fireworks Factory. There were also four quarries producing excellent freestone. Today however, it is an attractive residential suburb, just west of Tamarama Beach.

=== History of Bondi Beach ===
Bondi Beach and Bondi Park were part of the Bondi Estate originally granted to William Roberts in 1810. Although the area was in private ownership, the use of the beach by the public was made permissible by the owners from 1855, and the foreshore lands became popular as a picnicking and pleasure resort.

In 1882, an area of 10 hectares (25 acres) at Bondi Beach was dedicated as a public reserve. Early improvements following the dedication included baths opened c. 1889, bathing sheds were erected in 1903, and a weatherboard shed for the Bondi Surf Bathers' Life Saving Club was built in 1907. The Bondi Surf Bathers' Life Saving Club and the North Bondi Surf Life Saving Club were founded in 1906, and are two of the oldest surf clubs in Australia. The present clubhouse of the Bondi Surf Bathers Life Saving Club was constructed in 1934, and the present club house of the North Bondi Surf Club was opened in 1933.

A number of improvements ensued. In 1911, bathing sheds accommodating 750 men and 250 women were opened, described as the "finest bathing accommodation of any of the ocean beaches". A shed for the North Bondi Surf Life Saving Club was provided in the same year. Between 1911 and 1920, the sea wall at Bondi Beach was constructed. Funded by the Government of New South Wales, the work was carried out by the Public Works Department. The wall was an early attempt to control the drifting sand problem experienced at Bondi, but only met with partial success. In 1924 the sand dunes at the north of the beach caused the sea wall to fail.

In 1923, Waverley Council implemented a Bondi Beach and Park Improvement Scheme. An open competition called on designers to provide a kiosk and surf sheds, three lavatory blocks with separate accommodation for males and females, a band stand, layout of the park surrounding the buildings, increased pedestrian and vehicular traffic capacity and elimination of cross traffic over the Marine Drive and Promenade. The architectural firm of Robertson and Marks won the competition with a design which was semicircular in plan, with a circular core, and a Classical style elevation to the beach. This design, as well as improvements to the park and ancillary structures, including car parks, radiating paths, and bridges, was estimated to cost (Pounds)100,000. Encountering difficulties in funding the project, in 1926 Waverley Council instructed Robertson and Marks to revise their scheme to include fund raising elements, such as baths. The plans for the park, sea wall, and traffic provisions were further amended on the basis of recommendations from the Commission of Inquiry into the scheme held by the Department of Local Government. The Inquiry accepted the revised scheme in 1927, and Waverley Council secured a loan of A£120,000 from the Commonwealth Bank for the construction of the scheme. A further A£40,000 was borrowed in 1930 to complete the scheme. By the standards of the time, the scale and cost of the Bondi Beach Improvement Schemes was an unprecedented undertaking for a local Council in NSW. The foundation stone marking the commencement of construction of the improvement scheme was laid on 26 May 1928 by the Mayor of Waverley, Alderman David Hunter. The Bondi Surf Pavilion was sufficiently complete by December 1928 to allow the public to use the accommodation. Six months later, Turkish baths and hot water baths were opened. The official opening of the Bondi Beach Improvement Scheme was held on 21 December 1929 before 160,000 to 200,000 onlookers. In addition to the erection of the pavilion building, the scheme included the layout of a Marine Drive (now Queen Elizabeth Drive), bridges, car parking, promenade, and park plantings.

The implementation of the improvement scheme required the relocation of the Bondi Surf Bathers Life Saving Club house to a point 91 metres (100 yd) north to where the present building is situated. Subsequently, a new club house, designed by Ross & Rowe, architects, was opened in 1934. The building was extended in the 1970s and 1980s. The Bondi Surf Pavilion offered, in addition to surf sheds and dressing accommodation, Turkish and hot water baths, retail premises, entertainment in the ballroom, cabaret theatre, and auditorium and dining. Bathing costumes, towels, lockers, and dressing cubicles were available for hire. The ground floor of the building originally held two courtyards, one for men and one for women, with individual changing booths constructed in rows in each. Tunnels leading from each courtyard led underneath Marine Parade to a pair of concrete groynes opening onto the beach. Owing to the outbreak of war in the Pacific, the two concrete groynes leading from the pavilion onto the beach were demolished in 1942, and the park area was secured by barbed wire.

In the post-World War II era, the Bondi Surf Pavilion experienced a decline as changes in bathing costumes (from heavy woollen costumes to nylon) eliminated the need for changing sheds. The rise in popularity of the motor car meant that individuals could visit any number of beaches; whereas in the pre-war years the Bondi tram ensured that Bondi Beach was a popular beach destination for the public. Although Bondi Surf Pavilion itself began to decline in its commercial prospects (Council reported an operating loss of (Pounds)17,000 for the year 1955), Bondi Beach itself was cemented in the national identity as the quintessential Australian beach, as evidenced by its selection as the location for the 1954 "Royal Command" Surf Carnival, held in the presence of Her Majesty the Queen and His Royal Highness the Duke of Edinburgh. In the 1950s and 1960s, the ground floor refreshment rooms were operated by lessees, while the main hall and auditorium were rarely used. In the 1970s, steps were taken to increase the community use of the pavilion. The theatre on the upper floor was officially opened by the Prime Minister, Gough Whitlam in 1975.

Demolition of the change rooms, lockers, former Turkish baths, and courtyard took place in 1977 to 1978 to create a netball court, an art gallery, gymnasiums, an amphitheatre and other facilities as part of Waverley Council's cultural program. The building was officially opened as the Bondi Surf Pavilion Community Centre in 1978 by the NSW Premier, Neville Wran. Bondi Surf Pavilion still continues to be a community cultural centre, housing a theatre, a gallery, rehearsal, meeting and function rooms. The external arcades, change rooms and toilets continue to be used by visitors to the beach. Many arts, cultural, and film festivals take place at the pavilion throughout the year.

The Norfolk Island pine trees (Araucaria heterophylla) in Bondi Park began to die off in the late 1960s, and a Select Parliamentary Committee of Enquiry reviewed the problem in 1971, concluding that the death of the trees was the result of deleterious effects of off-shore pollutants introduced via the North Bondi sewerage outfall. The concrete lookout tower on the butt of the southern groyne was constructed in 1975, after the foundations of groynes were exposed during severe storms in late 1974. During the 1980s, A$4 million was allocated for improvements in Bondi Park, including the erection of picnic shelters, reconstruction of the pavilion forecourt area and entrance to car parking at Queen Elizabeth Drive, and construction of a skateboard track. The sea wall and promenade were stabilised between 1987 and 1992. Further work was done in constructing new pathways and planting trees in Bondi Park in 1992.

Bondi Park is a Crown reserve that was dedicated for Public Recreation on 28 January 1938. Waverley Council was appointed trustee for the care control and management of the reserve, on behalf of the Minister for Lands, on that date. Subsequently, the Bondi Park (D.500048) Reserve Trust was established for the management of Bondi Park, with Waverley Council appointed to manage this trust on 12 April 1996.

The Marine Discovery Centre at Bondi Pavilion (which opened there in 2008) closed in October 2013, being unable financially to continue. Waverley Council have called for expressions of interest for the space, citing a tourist information centre as one of several options being considered.

In December 2015 Waverley Council released a concept design for a $38 million upgrade of the Bondi Beach Pavilion, proposing a complete makeover of front and rear facades, new theatre seating for 200 with retractable seats and toilet and shower facilities. Designed by Tonkin Zulaikha Greer the upgrade aims to maximise use of under-used spaces for the 14 million visitors to the beach each year. Council is expected to inject $14 million with the shortfall made up from federal and state government funds. A federal grant of $1 million has been committed. The concept plan is on exhibition until February 2016.

== Description ==
Bondi Beach is located between Ben Buckler Head and McKenzie Point, and is approximately one-kilometre (zero-point-six-two-mile) long and ranges in width from 50 metres (160 ft) at the north end to 100 metres (330 ft) at the south end.

Bondi Park is bordered to the west by Campbell Parade, and the east by Queen Elizabeth Drive and Bondi Beach. The park is mostly grassed with a variety of shelters for picnics, walkways and tree plantations. The Bondi Surf Pavilion lies within the park and is the dominant architectural feature in the immediate vicinity of Bondi Beach.

The Bondi Surf Pavilion is designed in Mediterranean/Georgian revival architecture and consists of a core double floor building facing a single storey arched colonnade and flanked by single level wings at either end with colonnaded walls covering two inner courtyards. The walls are made of cement, the floors are made of reinforced concrete and timber, the roof is lined with concrete roof tiles, and the windows and doors are timber framed and glazed. The joinery at the building's northeastern end is original. There is an actual theatre, a museum, an amphitheatre, a basketball court, multiple conference spaces, a restaurant, dressing rooms and toilets in the Bondi Surf Pavilion.

The Bondi Surf Bathers Life Saving Club and North Bondi Surf Club are both situated within Bondi Park.

=== Condition ===
As of 20 July 2007, the main issues resulting from a comprehensive maintenance study conducted by Waverley Council include the existence of lead paint, the theatre 's inability to conform with the Building Code of Australia (BCA) in terms of egress and fire safety, and the rusting of a variety of large structural beams.

An objective visual review performed by Clive Lucas Stapleton & Partners for this appointment showed that the state of the Bondi Surf Pavilion and the Bondi Surf Bathers Life Saving Club Building was reasonably acceptable and that routine maintenance was undertaken. There are no elements of the building's physical state that affect the importance of the pavilion.

The Bondi Park landscaped area, including the picnic shelters and footpaths, received an update at the end of 2003 and are generally in good shape.

There was no clear appraisal of the research area's geological potential. There is some room for archeological ruins in the vicinity of Bondi Park that include details regarding older buildings, such as the early bathing sheds.

- Bondi Beach: Highly intact
- Bondi Park: Although pathways have been resurfaced, the layout of Bondi Park is substantially intact.
- Bondi Surf Pavilion: Although modified substantially in the 1970s and the subject of recent modern additions to the east facade, the building retains its external form and, to an extent, the internal courtyards. The modifications made to the planning and use of the internal spaces detract somewhat from the significance of this component; however, the architectural scale and resolution of the exterior of the building are of sufficient strength to enable the building's aesthetic character to be understood.
- Bondi Surf Bathers Life Saving Club Building: Although added to in the 1970s and 1980s, the building substantially retains its original external appearance

=== Modifications and dates ===
Changes to the Bondi Surf Pavilion building included the following:

- 1931 – Erection of outdoor auditorium which incorporated the caretaker's quarters in the first floor;
- c. 1942 – Groynes demolished as part of wartime preparation of Bondi Beach for defence against enemy landings;
- 1948 – Two additional exits and stairways, emergency exit lights, additional lavatory accommodation, fire fighting equipment, and ventilation to the ballroom to obtain a licence under the Theatre and Public Halls Act;
- 1955 – Tenders called for operation of the Bondi Surf Pavilion. Description in tender documents stated that the pavilion had been recently renovated and was in a good state of repair. Further details are not known;
- 1968 – Reconstruction of walls of the Bondi Surf Pavilion for structural reasons;
- 1972–75 – Former ballroom converted to theatre;
- 1977–78 – Change rooms, lockers, Turkish baths, courtyard demolished and replaced by large grassed area, amphitheatre, netball court, workshops for craft classes, art gallery, child care centre, two gymnasiums, restaurant as part of conversion of pavilion to a community centre;
- Unknown date (probably in the 1970s) – Reversal of auditorium (audience seating moved from west of pavilion to inside pavilion courtyard);
- 1980 – Courtyard walls painted with murals along the theme of "Bondi the Beautiful" based on 1920s images of Bondi;
- 1985 – Ceramic murals installed in foyer of the Bondi Surf Pavilion; and
- 1980s – Semi-circular pergola constructed to south of the Bondi SurfPavilion.

Recent changes from 2002 to 2005 to the Bondi Surf Pavilion included the following:

- Repainting of the pavilion and construction of new forecourt;
- Glazed semi-circular addition to northern end of pavilion to house seafood restaurant;
- Building constructed in south courtyard;
- Fenestration to northern end of east facade restored;
- Stormwater pipes fixed;
- Alterations for gelato bar at southern end of east side; and
- Foundation stone relocated.

Changes to the Bondi Surf Bathers Life Saving Club building included the following:

- 1951 – Additions to provide a gear room;
- 1970s/1980s – Additional rooms constructed to south-west of original building; mezzanine level added, first floor extended to east; and
- 2003 – New boat shed. Changes to the North Bondi Surf Life Saving Club included the following:
- 1950 – Observation Room completed;
- 1978 – Demolition of top floor of building, to be replaced by a 'VIP room'; and
- 2006 – Development Approval granted for works which will substantially alter the external appearance of the building

Changes to the Bondi Park included the following:

- 1970s – Pipe handrails along Queen Elizabeth Drive replaced; pathway paving rehabilitated;
- 1980s – Pavilion forecourt area reconstructed; and
- 2003 – Moulded concrete skate park (in place of earlier skate ramp in southern section of park); also landscape works including new pathways.
- October 2013 – Marine Discovery Centre at Bondi Pavilion closed. Waverley Council call for expressions of interest for the space.

=== Further information ===
Other harbour and ocean beaches in NSW where interwar beautification and/or improvement schemes were carried out by local authorities include Balmoral, Cronulla, Manly, Nobbys and Bar beaches (Newcastle), North and South beaches (Wollongong), Thirroul, The Entrance and Foster.

Extant pavilions of significance dating to the interwar period include the following:

- Manly Cove Pavilion – Mediterranean style, two storey, tiled roof, with colonnade and tile inlay decoration; located on the harbour side of Manly;
- Balmoral Bathers Pavilion – Mediterranean style, two storey, located on popular harbour beach in landscaped setting with associated rotunda;
- Cronulla Beach Surf Pavilion – Interwar Stripped Classical style, adjacent surf club house constructed at the same time (1940);
- Bar Beach Surf Pavilion – accommodated 600 visitors, contained surf club and kiosk, Spanish Mission and Art Deco styles, completed in 1933;
- North Beach Bathing Pavilion – Interwar Functionalist style, completed in 1938, single storey central pavilion with open-roofed dressing areas on either side;
- Newport and Freshwater Beaches – Mediterranean style pavilions with shared dressing and surf live savers' accommodation; and
- At The Entrance, a Mediterranean style surf life saving clubhouse was built in 1936 and designed as a pavilion to accommodate public changing rooms.

== Heritage listing ==
As at 23 September 2005, Bondi Beach, Bondi Park, Bondi Surf Pavilion, and the Bondi Surf Bathers Life Saving Club building form a cultural landscape of State significance as an iconic representation of the Australian beach experience. The place is historically significant as the site of many "firsts" and other significant events in surf lifesaving, and as the largest beach improvement scheme to be carried out in the interwar years. The place demonstrates the rapid increase in popularity of beach-going once restrictions on surf bathing were eased in the early 20th century.

The place is of social and aesthetic significance as a landmark, recognised internationally as a symbol of Australia's popular beach culture. While the Bondi Surf Pavilion has been modified over time, the relationship of the building to the promenade and beach, as well as the park and its intact features (including two concrete pedestrian bridges with standard lamps, the promenade, and numerous pathways in original locations), retains its integrity to the 1928 beach improvement design.

Bondi Beach Cultural Landscape was listed on the New South Wales State Heritage Register on 23 May 2008 having satisfied the following criteria.

The place is important in demonstrating the course, or pattern, of cultural or natural history in New South Wales.

Bondi Beach is of State significance for its place in the history of beach swimming, surfing, and surf life saving in Australia in the 19th and 20th centuries. As attitudes toward surf bathing changed from a restricted and dangerous activity to that of a national pastime, Bondi Beach and the area of Bondi Park were the scene of numerous events in the history of beach-going in Australia which contributed greatly to the development of Australian beach culture, including:

- Use as picnic grounds and pleasure resort from 1855;
- Establishment of two of Australia's oldest surf life saving clubs: the Bondi Surf Bathers Life Saving Club and the North Bondi Surf Club in 1906;
- First use of the surf reel in life saving, by the Bondi Surf Bathers Life Saving Club, 1907;
- Location of the first Surf Life Saving Association titles competition in 1915;
- "Black Sunday", 6 February 1938, when five people drowned at Bondi Beach and hundreds were rescued after a series of waves crashed into the beach – the largest ever rescue on one day. This is remembered as "one of the most significant and tragic days in the history of Australian life saving." Surf Life Saving Australia history fact sheet #7) The Bondi Surf Bathers Life

Saving Club as a whole was given a Special Meritorious Award by the Surf Life Saving Association of Australia for its bravery in the rescue work; and

- "Royal Carnival" – a national surf carnival was held at Bondi in the presence of Queen Elizabeth II and the Duke of Edinburgh.

Other more recent events are also historic milestones, namely:

- Demonstrating the worldwide esteem held for Bondi Beach, it was chosen as the site of the 2000 Olympics Beach Volleyball competition;
- Bondi Beach was the location of the launch of the "Year of the Surf Life Saver" (2007) as 5,000 red and yellow flags were set out on the beach in commemoration of the centenary of surf life saving and 500,000 lives saved by rescuers; and
- Bondi Beach is also the destination of the annually "City to Surf" fun run competition.

The Bondi Surf Pavilion and Bondi Park are components in Waverley Council's (Pounds)160,000 Bondi Beach Improvement Scheme, brought about by the immense popularity of the beach for recreation in the 1920s. The improvement scheme was an unprecedented undertaking for a local government authority at the time, and historically representative of the importance placed on bathing and the beach as a recreational amenity for the population of the state, not only the local area. The improvement scheme is a landmark in the history of urban design in NSW because of its ambitious scale.

The place is important in demonstrating aesthetic characteristics and/or a high degree of creative or technical achievement in New South Wales.

Bondi Beach is of State significance for its considerable aesthetic appeal for its width, the gentle slope of the sand, its crescent shape, and the headlands which define its northern and southern points. The scale of the beach and its relationship with the foreshore development, including Bondi Park, Bondi Surf Pavilion, Bondi Surf Bathers Life Saving Club building and the North Bondi Surf Club, form a cultural landscape which is a landmark of not only the Sydney region, but an iconic image of Australia, recognised internationally as a symbol of Australia and the attractions of the country. Within the context of Bondi Beach, the Bondi Surf Pavilion is of State significance as the largest and most resolved example of a beach pavilion in NSW, and continues to be so to this day.

The place has strong or special association with a particular community or cultural group in New South Wales for social, cultural or spiritual reasons.

The Bondi beach Cultural landscape is of State significance because Bondi Beach, together with the Bondi Surf Pavilion, Bondi Park, the Bondi Surf Bathers Life Saving Club and the North Bondi Surf Club buildings, represents at a national level the culture of beach bathing which has dominated past and present the popular image of the Australian outdoors lifestyle. In this context it is an icon regularly seen in works of art and promotional material, such as the widely-known Max Dupain photographs, Sunbaker (1937) and Form at Bondi (1939).

Bondi Beach and its associated attractions are of outstanding significance to the state as one of the most popular destinations for international and domestic visitors to Sydney. Particularly amongst travellers from the UK and Ireland, Bondi Beach has attained a mythic status as the traditional place for international visitors to spend Christmas Day, when usually up to 40,000 people visit the beach (cultureandrecreation.gov.au/articles/beach). A 2005 survey of 15,000 British holiday-makers conducted by the travel company Trailfinders showed that Bondi Beach was the "favourite beach in the Pacific". A study carried out for Tourism NSW showed that in 1999, 34% of visitors to Sydney went to Bondi Beach, making it the most highly visited Sydney attraction outside of the CBD. Bondi Beach is held in very high esteem by the people of NSW as a place to visit and as a symbol of the Australian way of life.

The place possesses uncommon, rare or endangered aspects of the cultural or natural history of New South Wales.

The Bondi Beach Cultural Landscape demonstrates rarity at the State level as The Bondi Surf Pavilion is the largest surf beach pavilion to be constructed in Sydney, exemplifying the enormous growth in popularity of surf bathing of the 1920s and 1930s, a period during which many beachside beautification and improvement schemes were carried out by local and State authorities. The use of Bondi Beach in depictions of the quintessential Australian beach lifestyle in popular culture and works of art is unparalleled by any other beach in Australia.

The association of Bondi Beach with two of the earliest surf life saving clubs in Australia, and the important role played by the clubs in the development of the Australian surf life saving movement, is a rare attribute, matched only by Manly Beach.

The place is important in demonstrating the principal characteristics of a class of cultural or natural places/environments in New South Wales.

The Bondi Beach Cultural Landscape is State significant for its ability to represent all of the elements which are typical of the Australian beach: a pavilion for public changing rooms, surf life saving club(s), wide expanse of sand, grassy park for picnicking, a promenade/marine drive, and the availability of ocean swimming.

Bondi Beach, Bondi Park, and the Bondi Surf Pavilion form an excellent representation of Australian popular beach culture. The Bondi Surf Pavilion is representative of a class of buildings found frequently along the coast of NSW, and is of State significance as the largest, most resolved example of the type.

== See also ==
- 1907 Sydney bathing costume protests
- Australian culture
- Bondi Beach
- Culture of Sydney
