= Shakespeare by the Sea, Halifax =

Canadian theatre company

Shakespeare by the Sea
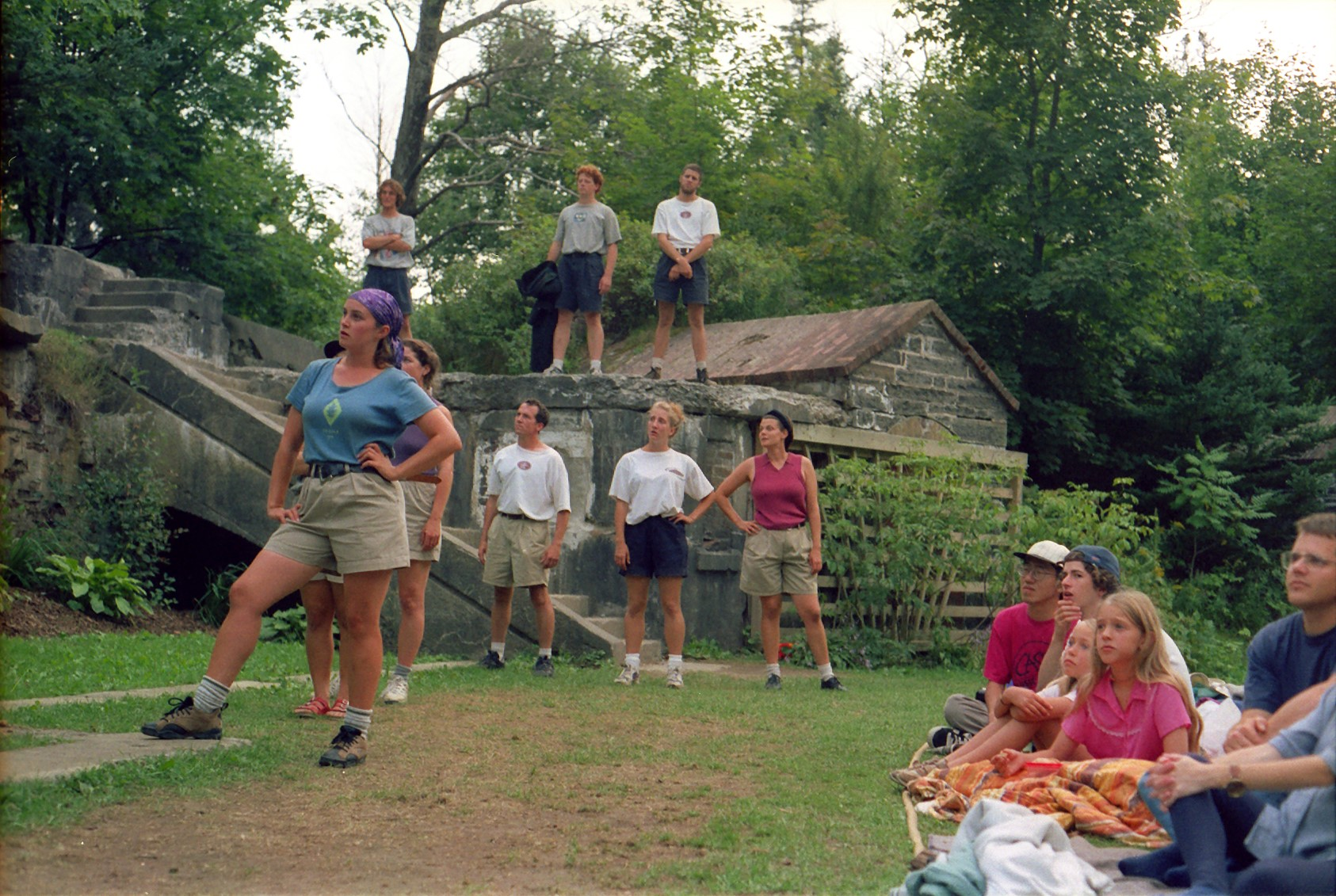
- The Shakespeare by the Sea drama group performing The Comedy of Errors in Halifax, Nova Scotia, August 1996.
- Formation: 1994
- Type: Theatre group
- Purpose: Outdoor theatre
- Location: Point Pleasant Park, Halifax, Nova Scotia
- Artistic directors: Jesse MacLean (2021-present); Jesse MacLean and Elizabeth Murphy (2012-2021); Elizabeth Murphy (2007-2012); Jennie Raymond and Elizabeth Murphy (2006); Patrick Christopher Carter and Elizabeth Murphy (1994-2005)
- Notable members: Meredith MacNeill; Irene Poole; Raquel Duffy; Patricia Zentilli; Jeremy Webb; Tony Nappo; Drew Douris-O'Hara; Jade Douris-O'Hara
- Website: www.shakespearebythesea.ca

Shakespeare by the Sea is a professional theatre company and registered charitable society in Halifax, Nova Scotia.

== History ==
Founded in 1994, Shakespeare by the Sea specializes in performing the works of William Shakespeare. Plays are performed outdoors in an amphitheatre formed by the ruins of the Cambridge Battery, an old military battery in Point Pleasant Park, and occasionally at other locations. The company is partially funded by government grants and private enterprise, with the main source of revenue coming from patrons' donations, which makes up about 70% of their revenues.

The Studio at Shakespeare by the Sea is their in-house theatre school, which offers training in Shakespeare and musical theatre performance.

The company was formed by the late Patrick Christopher-Carter (1945–2005), his lifelong partner Elizabeth Murphy, and the late Jean Morpurgo (1946-2010). It has played every year in the park, performing three to four productions every summer.

In 1999, a "family" show was added to the repertoire using a theme from a classical fairy tale or legend. The tale's script is collectively created by the director and the cast and usually includes a musical element created by a composer. From 1999 to 2004, the family show was known for its lack of traditional props, with only colourful Styrofoam pool noodles being used to create all props and set pieces.

In the summer of 2005, the company went away from the Pool Noodle concept and transformed the family show into a musical, directed by Jesse MacLean, with music written by actor Jeremy Hutton and lyrics by Hutton, MacLean, William Foley, Kevin MacPherson, and Kate Smith titled The Adventures of Robin Hood. The show, with new music and lyrics by Hutton and Kieren MacMillan, then received two workshop productions at the Toronto Youth Theatre in 2007 and 2008, both directed by Hutton. Shakespeare By The Sea brought the show back to Point Pleasant Park for production in the summer of 2011, garnering significant popular and critical success. In January, 2013, Toronto's Hart House Theatre presented a three-week run of the newest incarnation of the show, now entitled "Robin Hood: The Legendary Musical Comedy". This production played to many sold-out houses, and was a darling of both audiences and critics.

In 2005, the Canada Day performance was The Midnight Twelfth Night, which began at midnight and concluded with the marriage of founders Patrick Christopher-Carter and Elizabeth Murphy. Following the sudden passing of Christopher-Carter later that year, in 2006 Elizabeth Murphy and Jennie Raymond formed a co-artistic directorship to steer the company through a transitional year. In 2007, Elizabeth Murphy took over as Artistic Director.

In some years a one-off peripatetic performance is staged, using various local, historic sites and batteries as dramatic settings for the play. To date, the company has performed Hamlet at the Prince of Wales Martello Tower twice, Richard III at the Sir Sandford Fleming Tower and at the Halifax Citadel, Henry V at the Halifax Citadel, King Lear at the Halifax Citadel, Julius Caesar in the historic courthouse on Spring Garden Road and Measure for Measure at the Prince of Wales Martello Tower.

Murphy led the drive to develop the rehearsal and office space that the company uses into The Park Place Theatre, an 82-seat black box venue, to be used in the event of poor weather during the summer. The theatre has allowed the company to expand its operations into the spring and fall with small-scale productions happening on an annual basis. The venue has also become a valued rehearsal and performance space for other small theatre companies based in Nova Scotia from September to May each year.

In 2012, longtime Artistic Associate Jesse MacLean joined Elizabeth Murphy as a Co-Artistic Director. Since 2003, MacLean has directed over two dozen productions for the company.

2013 marked the 20th season of professional theatre presentation by Shakespeare By The Sea. The company played to 13,000 over 68 performances in Point Pleasant Park, making it one of the most successful seasons in recent years.

In 2013, Shakespeare by the Sea was presented with the Theatre Nova Scotia Robert Merritt Legacy Award.

In 2019, Shakespeare by the Sea launched The Studio at Shakespeare by the Sea, a theatre school encompassing training programs in Shakespeare and Musical Theatre performance for young people. Jade Douris O'Hara joined the staff as the company's first-ever Resident Artist, and as the Studio Director.

Drew Douris-O'Hara joined the staff as Artistic Associate (2019-2012), and later Associate Artistic Director (2021-present)

== Productions ==
Information about past productions is from the Shakespeare by the Sea website's section for "Past Performances".

=== 1994–1999 ===
Year	Productions
1994	Twelfth Night
1995	A Midsummer Night's Dream
1996	A Midsummer Nights Dream; The Comedy of Errors; The Martello Tower Hamlet
1997	Romeo and Juliet; As You Like It; The Martello Tower Macbeth
1998	The Little Prince; Richard III; Much Ado About Nothing; Henry V
1999	Taming of the Shrew; King Lear; Titus Andronicus; Waiting for Godot; Jacob Two Two

=== 2000–2009 ===
Year	Productions
2000	Romeo and Juliet (in the U.K); A Midsummer Night's Dream; Julius Caesar; Rosencrantz and Guildenstern; Fables- The Lost Forest; Scotland Road
2001	Twelfth Night
2002	A Midsummer Night's Dream; The Tempest; As You Like It; Alice in the HRM
2003	Coriolanus; The Merry Wives of Windsor; Hamlet; Peter Pan in the HRM
2004	Romeo and Juliet; The Two Gentlemen of Verona; Richard III; Snow White and the Seven Dwarfs
2005	The Merchant of Venice; Pericles Prince of Tyre; Twelfth Night; Robin Hood
2006	Much Ado About Nothing; The Wizard of "Uh" Oz
2007	Taming of the Shrew; All's Well That Ends Well; Pinocchio
2008	A Midsummer Night's Dream; Othello; Cinderelly
2009	Love's Labour's Lost; Macbeth; Jack and the Beanstalk-Market

=== 2010– ===
Year	Productions
2010	Twelfth Night; Julius Caesar; Treasure Island (Note: In support the 100 year celebration of the Royal Canadian Navy.)
2011	The Complete Works of William Shakespeare (abridged); The Comedy of Errors; Measure for Measure; Robin Hood; Dracula
2012	The Agony and Ecstasy of Steve Jobs; The Merry Wives of Windsor; Titus Andronicus; Alice in Wonderland; Nevermore: The Hallowe'en Visions of Edgar Allan Poe
2013	Hamlet; Much Ado About Nothing; Snow White; Dr. Jekyll & Mr. Hyde
2014	The Taming of The Shrew; The Merchant of Venice; Cinderelly: The Wild West Musical; Tom Smith's Stupid Christmas (For Jerks)
2015	A Midsummer Night's Dream; Antony & Cleopatra; Sleeping Beauty: The 1980's Time Travel Pop Musical; I Am My Own Wife; Tom Smith's Stupid Christmas (For Jerks)
2016	As You Like It; King Lear; Pinocchio
2017	Peter Pan; All's Well That Ends Well; Julius Caesar
2018	Alice in Wonderland; Othello; Twelfth Night
2019	The Wizard of Oz Henry V Love's Labour's Lost
2020	Flagship Season cancelled due to COVID-19.Introduction of the By the Sea series:Hello City ImprovHalifax Fringe Festival
2021	A Midsummer Night's Dream (dir. Drew Douris-O'Hara) By the Sea Series featuring Hello City Improv, Adventures by Gillian Clark presented by Keep Good Theatre Company, Halifax Fringe Festival, A Tale on Two Wheels presented by Gale Force Theatre
2022	Cinderelly (dir. Jesse MacLean) Hamlet (dir. Drew Douris-O'Hara) By the Sea Series featuring Hello City Improv and Halifax Fringe Festival
2023	Pinocchio (dir. Jesse MacLean) Romeo and Juliet (dir. Drew Douris-O'Hara)
2024	Alice in Wonderland (dir. Jesse MacLean) Twelfth Night (dir. Drew Douris-O'Hara) The Unrehearsed Macbeth on Sept 1, 2024
2025	Robin Hood (dir. Jesse MacLean) As You Like It (dir. Drew Douris-O'Hara) The Unrehearsed Romeo and Juliet on August 31, 2025

== Notes and references ==
=== Sources ===
- Anderson, Mike (January 13, 2013). "Review: Robin Hood: The Legendary Musical Comedy (Hart House)". Mooney on Theatre.
- Barnard, Elissa; Nemetz, Andrea (December 28, 2011). "Best 11 plays of 2011". The Chronicle Herald.
- Barnard, Elissa (May 1, 2013a). "Hamlet highlights Shakespeare by the Sea". The Chronicle Herald.
- Barnard, Elissa (June 28, 2013b). "Your guide to summer theatre in Nova Scotia". The Chronicle Herald.
- Bégin, Victoria (January 13, 2013). "Robin Hood: The Legendary Musical Comedy". Theatromania.
- Sumi, Glenn (January 21, 2013). "Robin Hood: The Legendary Musical Comedy". NOW.
- "History". Shakespeare by the Sea. n.d.
- "Past Shows". Shakespeare by the Sea. n.d.

== See also ==
- Culture of Halifax, Nova Scotia
- Shakespeare by the Sea (Australia)
