= Balmoral Bathers Pavilion =

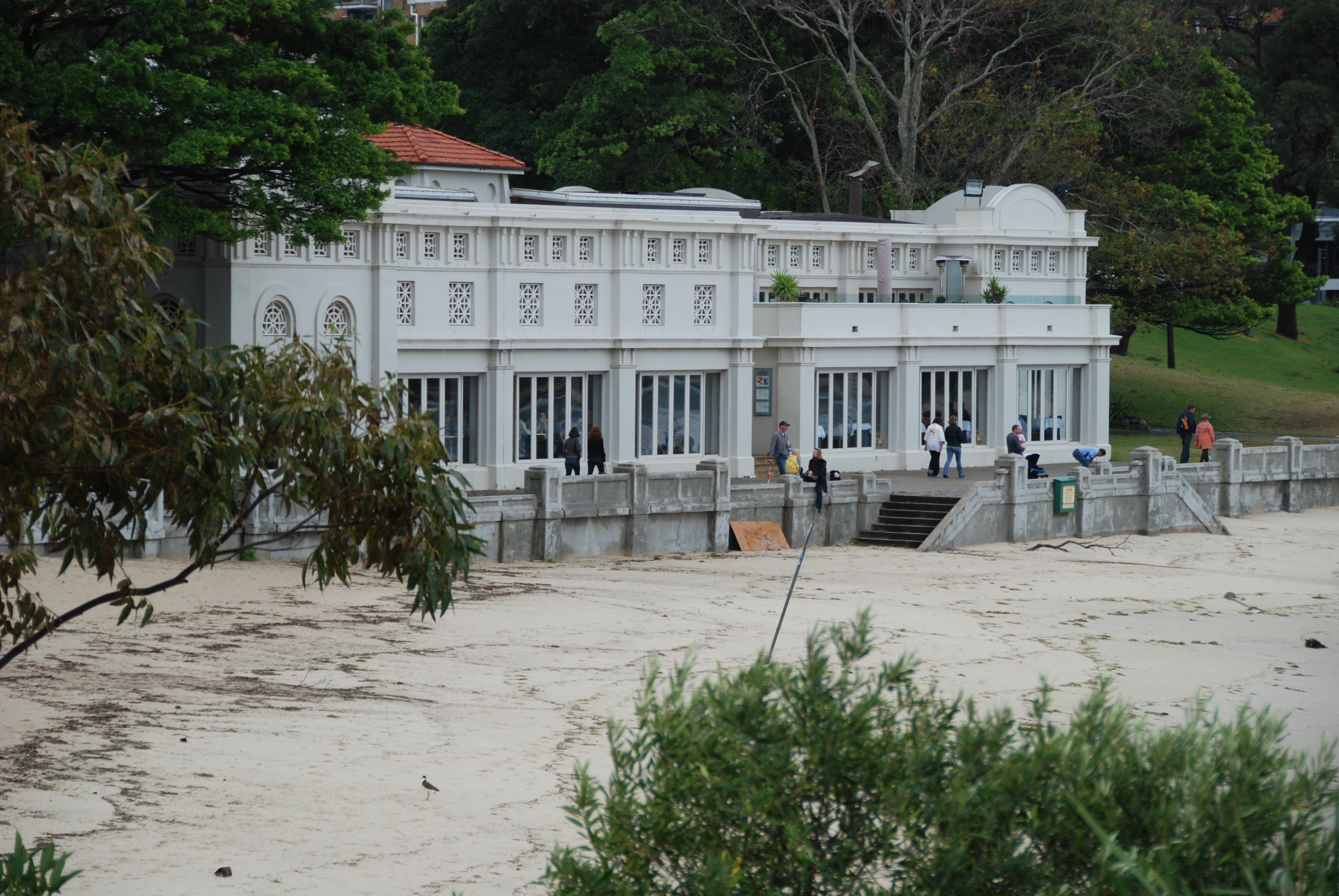
- Balmoral Bathers Pavilion, 2007

- Location within Sydney Location within Australia
- 33°49′21″S 151°15′03″E
- Location: The Esplanade, Balmoral, Mosman Council, New South Wales, Australia

History
- Built: 1928–1929

Site notes
- Architect(s): Alfred H. Hale, Mosman Council Architect & Building Surveyor
- Owner: Mosman Council

New South Wales Heritage Register
- Official name: Balmoral Bathers Pavilion
- Type: State heritage (built)
- Designated: 2 April 1999
- Reference no.: 760
- Type: Pavilion
- Category: Recreation and Entertainment
- Builders: Girvan Brothers, Master Builders.

The Balmoral Bathers Pavilion is a heritage-listed former bathers' pavilion and now retail building, cafe and restaurant located at The Esplanade, Balmoral, New South Wales, a suburb of Sydney, Australia. It was designed by Alfred H. Hale, the Mosman Council Architect and Building Surveyor and built from 1928 to 1929 by Girvan Brothers, Master Builders. The property is owned by Mosman Council. It was added to the New South Wales State Heritage Register on 2 April 1999.

== History ==
Balmoral Bathing Pavilion was the product of a surge of interest in swimming that had begun in the 1890s. An increased public interest in swimming and the establishment of swimming clubs with a focus on competitive activities had encouraged a growth in baths and club facilities around Sydney. This led to demands for better beach access and better facilities for swimmers in the harbour and beachfront municipalities. To cater for the crowds flocking to their beaches, councils endowed with good beaches had to provide the desired facilities to keep up with the competition of neighbouring councils. In response to this beach culture and the expectation of more amidst the increasing affluence of the 1920s, councils built a rash of new sea walls, tidal walls, sea pools, change rooms, kiosks and facilities which have become so much a part of the identity of their locations, including Mosman's. This culminated with the grand pavilions of the 1930s, such as those at Balmoral and Bondi, which were completed during the darker days of the Great Depression.

The 1920s and 30s saw great physical change at Balmoral beach. By the end of the 1930s the foreshores of Hunters Bay had been secured in public ownership through the exercise of new local government powers by Mosman Council and council funds had been committed to extensive improvements in the facilities and setting of new beach reserves.

The Bathers Pavilion was constructed during 1928 and 1929. It stood on land that had previously been surveyed and developed for private residential lots. Resumptions during the 1920s brought it back into community ownership in such a way that the building eventually stood partly on dedicated public recreation land and partly on land owned in freehold by Mosman Council.

The pavilion was designed by council architect and building surveyor, Alfred H. Hale. It had to meet with public requirements as well as be an ornament to the beach. Financing of the pavilion was a serious matter. In 1927, Council had gratefully accepted a donation of twenty pounds towards the construction of a "shelter pavilion" from FLR Ford. They had hoped that by publicising this offer others would be induced to follow the example, this does not appear to have happened. Girvan Brothers, Master Builders', tender of A£10,450 for construction of the pavilion was accepted on 24 July 1928, and the foundation stone was laid on 21 August 1928 by Alderman Harry Carter. In total, the construction of the Pavilion required Council to raise a loan of A£12,000, which was secured with the Commonwealth Bank at 6 per cent interest.

The pavilion was officially opened on Wednesday 20 February 1929 by Mayor Alderman A. Buckle before a large gathering of citizens and visitors. These included Sir Thomas Henley and mayors of Lane Cove and North Sydney.

Council intentions for the pavilion were brisk and business-like. It decided to lease the pavilion rather than manage the complex, considering that it would be difficult to maintain proper supervision and may become a financial burden. Tenders were called for a three-year lease of the pavilion from 21 February 1929. Mr R. C. Shearer, owner of the Balmoral Swimming Baths was announced as the successful tender. Tenders were also announced for the sub-lease of a portion of the pavilion for the sale of refreshments. This met with opposition from Balmoral shopkeepers.

The new structure had not been entirely completed by the occupation of Mr Shearer and his business. Five pounds was deducted from his first rent installment by way of compensation for the inconvenience. He was further compensated for loss associated with damages sustained to clothing due to leakages in the roof. It is thought this may have referred to the caretakers' quarters.

In 1932 tenders were called for alterations to the pavilion but plans, specifications and particulars have not survived. Tenders were called every three years for the lease of the building. Again no specific documentation relating to this survives.

A sharp decline in use of the building's changing facilities saw council invite tenders for the use of the Balmoral Bathing Pavilion that were "in a manner compatible with the Balmoral area". A tender by Mr M. Knaef for a fifteen-year lease on the building that provided for its use as a restaurant in addition to the maintenance of the changing facilities was accepted by the council in 1967. The lease contained many clauses to establish that unless written consent was given, the building was not to be used other than as the Bather's pavilion, changing rooms, kiosk, and licensed restaurant with attendant facilities. In 1969 Mr Kanaef sought a ten-year extension to the current lease to cover his financial position. Mr Knaef did not commence work on the building until November 1969, but established his well known Misha's Restaurant, which was to confirm the pavilion's new status as a different kind of landmark. There was some community concern over the 1969 remodeling proposal and it became necessary for council to issue statements to quell these concerns.

In 1986 the lease was transferred to Mr I. J. Boles of the Boles Group of Companies who purchased Misha's Seafood Restaurant Pty Ltd. Subsequently, some improvements were made. In August 1988 the lease was transferred to Victoria Alexander and Andrew Joseph who established Balmoral Bathers' Pavilion Pty Ltd. Major improvements were proposed, again sparking considerable local debate and controversy over the future of the building and its context.

In 1989 Balmoral Bathers' Pavilion Pty Ltd lodged a Development Application seeking approval of the conversion of the pavilion into a ground floor restaurant with a private hotel of serviced apartments and conference facilities spread over the first floor and a new partial second floor. The site's zoning as Open Space Recreation (6a) would prevent this development. A Local Environment Plan (LEP) would be required to alter this. Council would also need the consent of the Lands Department, partial owner of the site, to advertise the proposal. The Department of Lands gave its consent for exhibition of the proposal and a draft LEP was prepared and exhibited in 1990. Two submissions were received, both against the proposal. Consultation with the Department of Planning resulted in the decision that the draft plan could not proceed.

In the meantime, the council had found that the division of ownership of the site might constitute a legal impediment to the Plan. Some 1,500 square metres (16,000 sq ft) of the site under the Department of Lands' ownership was resumed in order to bring the entire pavilion under Mosman Council's control and it was rededicated to public purposes. This was finally effected in 1993, bringing the building into complete council ownership. By this time controversy over the building's fate had increased and on 8 June 1993 a public meeting voted to enlist the Heritage Council's assistance in placing a Permanent Conservation Order (PCO) on the site. The order was made on the 27 August 1993.

== Description ==
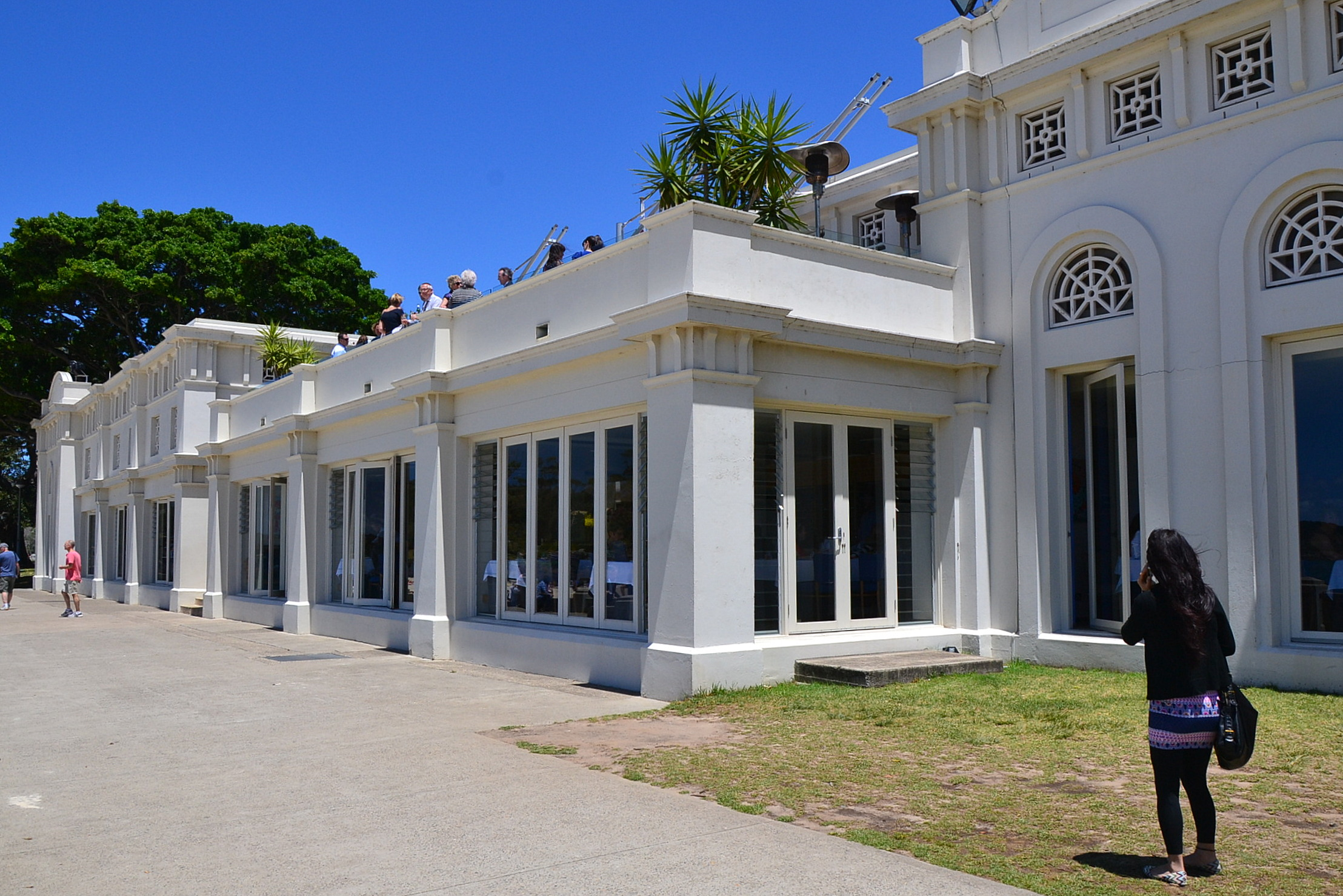
Pavilion, 2012

The pavilion is a two-storey, rendered brick construction of classic Mediterranean influence employing elements and finishes common to the "Spanish Mission" style. It is a broad, shallow U-shape - effectively an indented rectangle - opening onto the Esplanade on what is now perceived to be its rear western elevation, with its base, the eastern "front" elevation towards the Promenade. Central doorways in these major facades effectively divide the building into two halves.

The building appears as a massive white pavilion surrounded by trees of the reserve which tend to screen the building from the Esplanade.. The cornice line of the walls is straight except for the curved parapets which denote each corner. A low central tower roofed with orange terracotta Marseilles tiles and notable for its leaning central flagpole, is set back to the western side where it surmounts the original central entry door.

The building's elevations are divided into bays by plain attached pilasters. The longer elevations, divided by the central doorways, are arrayed as two ranges of four bays each. The shorter north and south elevations are respectively four and three bays each. At the north-east corner of the building the range of east facing bays north of the central passage are set lower than the remainder of the building, where the structure is set down to a single storey over a narrower bay of the northern elevations.

Externally, the solid elevations are relieved by arched and grilled openings to the principal corner bays outlined by render mouldings and a frieze of screened openings. Cement grilles encircle the entire perimeter and reappear as spaced single openings in the lesser bays of the facades.

Some timber joinery features in multi-paned, double-hung and fixed roundhead windows in the bays either side of the western entrance door and in the eastern facade's lower range of bays to the northern end. The southern range of the eastern facade features two recently modified bays of timber-framed and pivoting glazed doors with banks of louvre glass at each end. These are full height opening to modified base of two continuous steps of plain concrete.

The concealed roof of the building is partly modern metal decking and partly a fibreglass-reinforced membrane covered concrete slab over the two storey areas. The single storey areas are trafficable roof decks covered by gravelled bituminous membranes and surrounded by parapet walls.

Internally the building has a reinforced concrete structural frame sitting on a concrete base floor. The footings of the floor are essentially unknown. Off-form concrete posts support the first floor slab which has integral primary and secondary beams, bearing upon the solid brickwork outer walls, whose inner face is exposed and painted or colourwashed. The exterior walls appear to be solid brickwork reliant on their render coating for resistance to water penetration.

The soffit of the upper floor slab is exposed and now painted off-form concrete, bearing the lines of the boards employed in its formwork. The floor surfaces are variously covered with cement and bituminous or granolithic toppings and painted. Sloping floors at each level to the central courts where edge drains and sumps collected the water to convey it away deal with the problem of incoming stormwater caused by the central light courts in the change areas.

The condition of the building is poor.

=== Modifications and dates ===
The c. 1929 conversion of the boy's change area to a shop, possibly related to a 1929 sub-lease for the sale of refreshments, was probably the first change. Changes prior to the 1970s restaurant conversion have been minor. More substantial, piecemeal changes have been made since the establishment of the restaurant.

Extensive modifications have been made to the spatial arrangement of the interior of the ground floor, with partitionings of studwork and masonry, which effectively mirror the changes made to the interior over what is now more than twenty years of adaption. The upper level has been less modified.

== Heritage listing ==
The pavilion is of significance to Mosman, Sydney and NSW for its association with the development of the Mosman Municipality and in particular, the ensemble of buildings, structures and landscape which together comprise the Balmoral Beach reserve. The reserve is an important example of the community acquisition and development of beachfront lands for public recreation and amenity purposes which took place during the 1920s and 30s, sometimes as unemployment relief schemes. In its design and construction, the building is an important representative of its type, reflecting the architectural taste, construction economies and social mores of its day.

Balmoral Bathers Pavilion was listed on the New South Wales State Heritage Register on 2 April 1999 having satisfied the following criteria.

The place is important in demonstrating the course, or pattern, of cultural or natural history in New South Wales.

The Pavilion was a modern, up-to-date building that was evidence of the young community's commitment to the enjoyment and promotion of its natural beauty and attractions for a growing, confident population. Historically it represents the community's view of itself and new challenges civic leaders were faced with when charged with the responsibility of places of natural beauty. The pavilion represents architectural fashion and the search for new architectural expressions appropriate for the climate and can be associated with the 1920s and 30s boom in sea bathing.

The place is important in demonstrating aesthetic characteristics and/or a high degree of creative or technical achievement in New South Wales.

Although prejudiced by its poor condition and the various unco-ordinated changes to its exterior, the Pavilion comfortably guards and dominates the northern end of the beach. It forms an emphatic reference point for the beach and the northern end of the promenade, as well as a more immediate landmark for those on the sand in front. From the harbour it is a clear landmark and a familiar shore marker and identifier of Balmoral at all hours due to its distinctive profile, scale, size, colour and night-lighting. It is part of the character and aesthetic experience of the Balmoral shoreline. The scale is reconciled with that of other nearby structures and features of the reserve through its surrounding screen of mature trees.

The place has a strong or special association with a particular community or cultural group in New South Wales for social, cultural or spiritual reasons.

It is probable that the Pavilion means many different things to those who know and use the reserve. The building is partly emblatic of the struggle to retain public access to the Harbour foreshores and has long been a part of Balmoral Reserve's sense of place - that local identity which residents and visitors alike venerate and wish to retain in the face of increasing visitor numbers.

The place has potential to yield information that will contribute to an understanding of the cultural or natural history of New South Wales.

The principal capacities of the Pavilion to contribute to history and science must reside within the historical and archaeological information that its fabric retains. Its construction technology and condition may also be of some research interest, particularly in regard to building practices such as concrete construction. Its research potential could not be said to be exhausted.

The place possesses uncommon, rare or endangered aspects of the cultural or natural history of New South Wales.

Few buildings of its type were architecturally as ambitious, large or as pleasingly sited. Many have been demolished or substantially modernised/ upgraded whereas the Balmoral pavilion retains its earlier fitout in part.

The place is important in demonstrating the principal characteristics of a class of cultural or natural places/environments in New South Wales.

An optimal example of its "genre", valuable for its qualities and survival in a condition indicative of its original condition, arrangement, use and setting.

== See also ==
- Bondi Pavilion
- Bondi Beach Cultural Landscape
