= Star Amphitheatre =

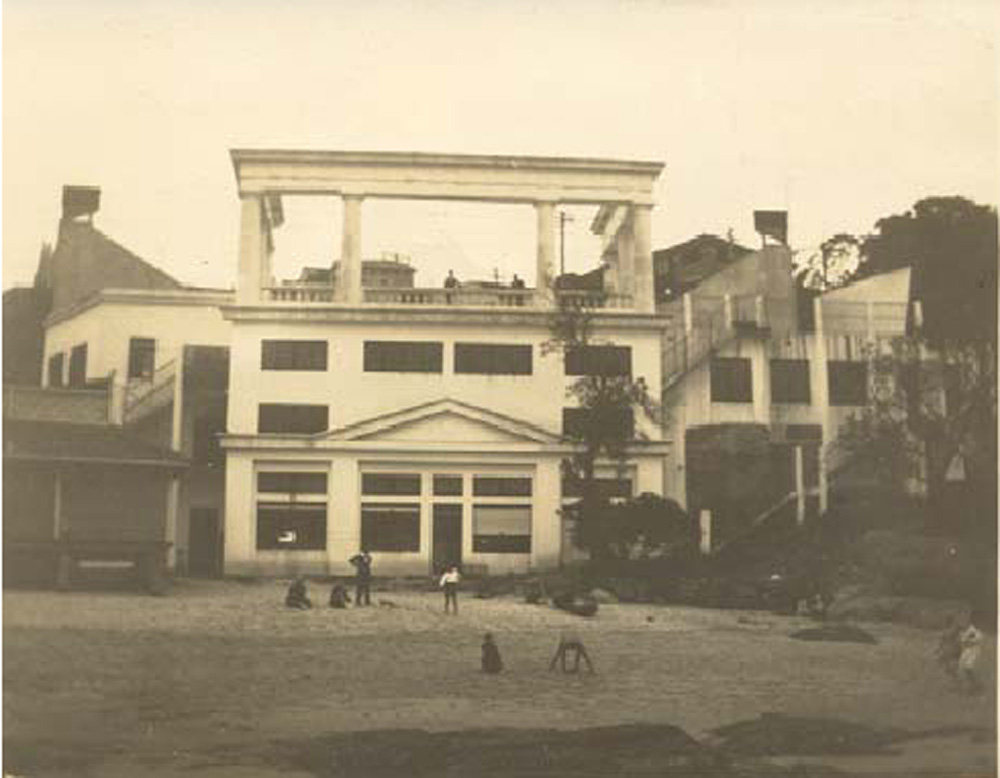
The Star Amphitheatre, circa 1925

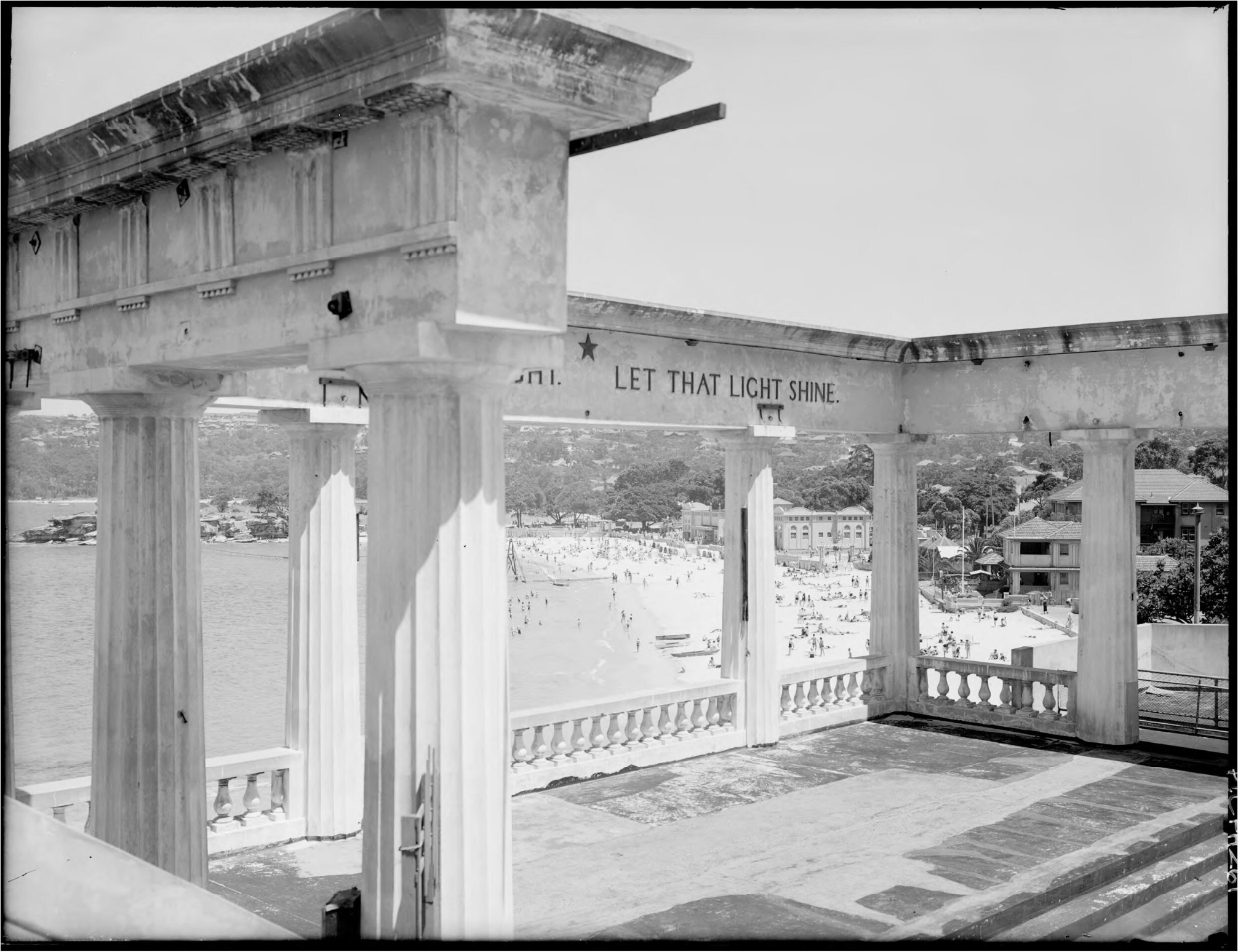
Star Amphitheatre in 1940s

The Star Amphitheatre was an open-air temple constructed in 1924 at Sydney's Balmoral Beach by the Order of the Star in the East, an organisation affiliated with the Theosophical Society founded to promote the works of Jiddu Krishnamurti. Constructed at a cost of around £16,000, the amphitheatre was intended as a platform for lectures by Krishnamurti, who Charles Webster Leadbeater declared the "World Teacher." The auditorium itself had a seating capacity of 2,000 with room for another thousand to stand. Underneath the stage was a library, meeting halls, meditation and tea rooms.

Krishnamurti went on to reject the messiah-like status granted to him by Leadbeater and dissolved the Order in 1929, leaving the amphitheatre to be sold off to entrepreneur George Bishop in 1931. Bishop used it for vaudeville performances and installed a mini golf course on the roof. The building was then sold again to the Catholic Church in 1936, and fell into disrepair until it was demolished in 1951 and replaced with a block of apartments named "Stancliff."

A persistent urban legend in Sydney says that the Amphitheatre was built in anticipation of the second coming to provide a viewing platform for Jesus Christ walking on water between Sydney Heads. Some versions of the story include tickets for the spectacle being sold to a gullible public.
